= List of films shot in Seattle =

This is a list of films shot in Seattle, Washington, United States.

== Films ==
=== 0–9 ===
- 4 Minute Mile (2014)
- 21 and Over (2013)
- 50/50 (2011)
- 88 Minutes (2008)
- 99 and 44/100 Per Cent Dead (1974)
- 10 Things I Hate About You (1999)

=== A ===
- A Bit of Bad Luck (2014)
- A Guy Thing (2003)
- A Year in the Life (1986)
- Act of Love (1980) (TV movie)
- American Heart (1992)
- An Officer and a Gentleman (1982)
- The Architect (2015) directed by Jonathan Parker
- Assassins (1995)

=== B ===
- Bad Attitude (1983) (TV movie)
- Bad Seed (2000) (a.k.a. Preston Tylk)
- Barefoot in the Park (1982) (TV movie)
- Battle in Seattle (2007)
- Before and After (1970s) directed by Barbet Schroeder
- Beta Test (2015)
- Better Off Dead directed by Neema Barnette (1993)
- Birthright (filmed 1988)
- Black Circle Boys (1997)
- Black Sheep (1996)
- Black Widow (1987)
- Bombs Away (1985)
- The Book of Bob (filmed 2008)
- The Book of Stars (1999)
- Born to Be Wild (1995)
- Boy Culture (2006)
- Brand Upon the Brain! (2006)
- Brush with Danger (2014)
- Buffalo Bill's Defunct: Stories from the New West (2004)
- Bullets, Blood & a Fistful of Ca$h (2006)
- Bustin' Loose (1981)
- Butterfly Dreaming (2008)

=== C ===
- Calamari Union (2008) directed by Richard Lefebvre; remake of Finnish Calamari Union
- Captain Fantastic (2016) directed by Matt Ross
- Catchfire (1990) developed as Back Track, disowned by director Dennis Hopper
- The Changeling (1980)
- Cinderella Liberty
- Class of 1999 (1990)
- Come See the Paradise (1990)
- Coming Out of the Ice
- The Cost of Living (2010)
- Countdown (filmed 1996)
- Crazy in Love (1992) (TV movie)
- Crimes of the Past (2009) a.k.a. The Spy and the Sparrow
- Cthulhu (2007)

=== D ===
- The Danger of Love: The Carolyn Warmus Story (1992) (TV movie)
- Daredreamer (1990)
- Darkdrive (1997)
- The Diary of Ellen Rimbauer (2003)
- The Dark Horse (2008)
- Dark Dungeons (2014)
- Dark Mansions (1986) (TV movie)
- Dear Lemon Lima (2009)
- Death Note (2017 film) (2017)
- Delivered (1999)
- Desert Cathedral (2014)
- The Details (2011)
- Dichotomy (2010)
- Disclosure (1994)
- Divination (2011)
- Dogfight (1991)

=== E ===
- Eden (2012)
- Eden (1996) directed by Goldberg Howard
- Eleanor and Franklin (1976) (TV movie)
- Endeavor (2014) directed by Robert Burke
- Enough (2002)
- Expiration Date (2006)

=== F ===
- The Fabulous Baker Boys (1989)
- Face of a Stranger (1991 TV movie) (based on Anne Perry novel)
- Fantasy A Gets a Mattress (2023)
- Farewell to Harry (2002)
- Fat Kid Rules the World (2012)
- Fear (1996)
- Fifty Shades Of Grey (2015)
- Twin Peaks: Fire Walk with Me (1992)
- Firewall (2006)
- Frances (1982)
- From Dusk till Dawn (1996)
- Fifty Shades Darker (2017)

=== G ===
- Georgia (1995)
- Get Carter (2000)
- Ghost Dad (1990)
- Grassroots (2012)

=== H ===
- The Hand that Rocks the Cradle (1992)
- Harry and the Hendersons (1987)
- Harry in Your Pocket (1973)
- Highway (2002 film) (2002) (originally titled The Leonard Cohen Afterworld)
- Hit! (1973)
- Homeland (2009)
- House of Games (1987)
- Humpday (2009)

=== I ===
- The Immaculate Conception of Little Dizzle (2009)
- Inheritance (2004) directed by Kris Kristensen
- An Innocent Love (1982) (TV movie)
- Into the Wild (2007)
- It Happened at the World's Fair (1963)

=== J ===
- Joyful Partaking (2002)
- Joyride (1977)
- Judas Kiss (2011)

=== K ===
- Keep Your Day Job, Superstar (2009)
- Kimi (2022)

=== L ===
- Laggies (2014)
- The Last Convertible (1979) miniseries based on Anton Olmstead Myrer's novel
- The Last Mimzy (2007)
- Late Autumn (2010)
- Lethal Admirer (2018) (TV movie)
- Life or Something Like It (2002)
- Little Buddha (1993)
- The Lives of Jenny Dolan (1975) (TV movie)
- Living Life (2004)
- Lost on the B Side (2006)
- Love Happens (2009)
- Lovers Lane (1999)
- Lucky Them (2013)

=== M ===
- Mad Love (1995)
- The Magtaberg Affair (filmed 1988)
- Manalive (2012)
- Matt's Chance (2013)
- McQ (1974)
- Mine Games (2012)
- Miss Shellagh's Miniskirt (2008)
- Mountainside (2023)

=== N ===
- The Naked Proof (2003)
- The Night Strangler (1973) (TV movie)
- North American (filmed 2008) directed by Robinson Devor
- Nothing Against Life (2013)
- Nothing Personal (Rolling Donut Productions, filmed 1988)
- Nutcracker: The Motion Picture (1986)

=== O ===
- Outsourced (2006)

=== P ===
- Pacific Aggression (2014)
- Pandora's Clock (1996) a.k.a. Doomsday Virus
- The Paper Tigers (2020)
- The Parallax View (1974)
- The Penitent Man (2010)
- Penny Candy (filmed 2009)
- Perfect 10 (2010) directed by Lindy Boustedt
- Plain Clothes (1987)
- Plaza Suite (1987) (TV adaptation with Carol Burnett)
- Police Beat (2005)
- Power (1986)
- Practical Magic (1998)
- The Prodigal (1983)
- The Promise (2004)
- Prefontaine (1997)

=== R ===
- Radio Rebel (2012) (TV movie)
- The Rape of Richard Beck (1985) (TV movie)
- Reflections of Murder (1974) (TV movie)
- Render Me Dead (2009)
- Resident Butch (2009)
- The Rich Man's Wife (1996)
- The Right to Bear Arms (2010)
- The Ring (2002)
- The Ring Two (2005)
- Rock Paper Scissors (2009)
- Rogue Saints Movie (filmed 2010)
- Rose Red (2002) (TV miniseries)

=== S ===
- Safety Not Guaranteed (2012)
- Say Anything... (1989)
- Scorchy (1976)
- The Search for Kennyboy (2012)
- Secrets and Lies (directed by North By Northwest, filmed 2008)
- Seven Hours to Judgement (1988)
- Shredder Orpheus (1990)
- Simon & Simon: In Trouble Again (1995) (TV movie, a.k.a. Precious Cargo)
- Singles (1992)
- The 6th Man (1997)
- Slaves to the Underground (1997)
- Sleepless in Seattle (1993)
- The Slender Thread (1965)
- Son of Terror (2008)
- Stamp of a Killer (1987) (filmed as Dangerous Affections)
- Starman (1984)
- Sweet Revenge (1976)

=== T ===
- Third Degree Burn (1989) (TV movie)
- Threat of Innocence (1994) (TV movie)
- Thursday's Child (1983) (TV movie)
- To Cross the Rubicon (1991)
- Touchy Feely (2013)
- Traveling (2008)
- Trouble in Mind (1985)
- True Adolescents (2009)
- Tugboat Annie (1933)
- Twice in a Lifetime (1985)

=== U ===
- Under Heaven (1998)
- An Upstanding Citizen (filmed 1998)

=== V ===
- The Vanishing (1993)

=== W ===
- WarGames (1983)
- Warwick (2016)
- Waxie Moon in Fallen Jewel (2011) directed by Wes Hurley
- We Go Way Back (2006)
- We Tour Econo (2020)
- Weather Girl (2009)
- While You Weren't Looking (2012) (short)
- The Whole Truth (2009)
- With a Vengeance (1992) (TV movie)
- World's Greatest Dad (2009)

=== Y ===
- Yonder
- You Came Along (1945)
- You Can't Win
- Young Joe, the Forgotten Kennedy (1977) (TV movie)

=== Z ===
- Zoo (2007)
