= Cora Baggerly Older =

American historian

Older c. 1909

Cora Miranda Baggerly Older (1875 – September 26, 1968) was an American writer and historian known for her California-based writing and activism. She often collaborated on social issues with her husband, Fremont Older, and she is now best remembered as a writer and historian of Californian events and people.

== Early life ==
Cora Miranda Baggerly was born in Clyde New York in 1875. She had a brother, Hilland Baggerly, who later worked in journalism as well. She attended Syracuse University.

== Writing career ==
Older's work covered a variety of mediums including novels, reviews, and magazine articles, often tackling social issues; she also wrote biographies of William Randolph Hearst and his father. She published her last book in 1961, seven years before her death. At one point, another writer described Older as "a woman whose womanly attributes commend a nobility of California's authors." She wrote under her married title as "Mrs. Fremont Older."

== Personal life ==
In 1893, she met newspaper editor Fremont Older while on summer vacation from Syracuse University, majoring in journalism. She and her classmates had performed in a play in Sacramento, which Fremont Older happened to have attended. They quickly became engaged and married a month later on August 22.

The couple lived in San Francisco hotels.

In 1912, the couple purchased some land and then two years built later Woodhills, a house of hybrid architectural features that Cora Older mostly directed. The property today is now a regional park known as the Fremont Older Open Space Preserve, and it has a "Cora Older Trail" available to the public. Throughout the 1910s and 1920s, she was associated with fellow activist and writer Stella Wynne Herron.
