= Charles Mudede =

Zimbabwean writer and filmmaker

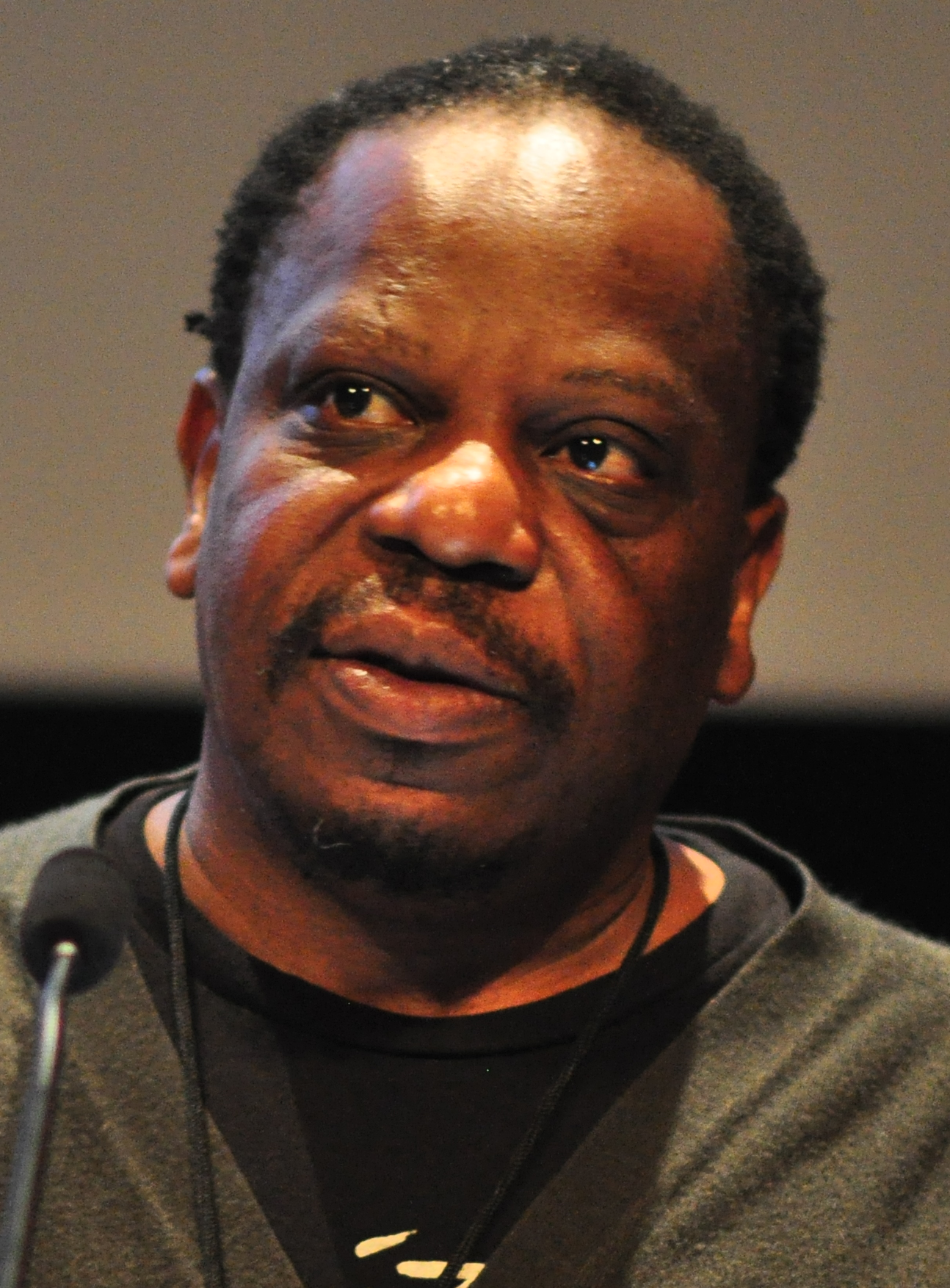
- Charles Mudede in 2016
- Born: Charles Tonderai Mudede; February 8, 1969 (age 57); Que Que, Rhodesia
- Occupations: Writer, filmmaker, journalist, editor, critic

Charles Tonderai Mudede (/mʊˈdɛdɛ/; born February 8, 1969) is a Zimbabwean-American writer, filmmaker, and leftwing cultural critic. Though born in Kwekwe (then called Que Que, Rhodesia), he spent much of his childhood in the United States, and returned to Zimbabwe shortly after independence. Between 1982 and 1988, his mother, Tracy Mudede, was a lecturer at the University of Zimbabwe, and his father, Ebenezer Mudede, was an economist for the Zimbabwe government. Between 1990 and 2001, his father worked as an economist for the Botswana government and his mother lectured at the University of Botswana. In 1989, he moved to the US to study literature, art history, and political philosophy. His parents moved to the US from Botswana in 2002 for medical reasons. The Mudedes are Manicas and were once close to Bishop Abel Tendekayi Muzorewa, the prime minister of the short-lived coalition government called Zimbabwe Rhodesia (1979–1980).

Mudede is currently Associate Editor for the Seattle-based weekly The Stranger, as well as a lecturer at Cornish College of the Arts. His Police Beat column was turned into a film of the same name in 2004. The movie was selected for competition at the Sundance Film Festival 2005. In 2003, Mudede published a short book called Last Seen with Diana George. Mudede was also a member of the now defunct Seattle Research Institute, a Marxist circle inspired by the Frankfurt School and the work of Hardt and Negri. SRI published two books, Politics Without The State and Experimental Theology. (Mudede and George edited the former.) Mudede has also published essays and articles with Nic Veroli, a French-American Marxist philosopher, and is on the editorial board for Arcade, an architectural journal. Mudede's work has appeared in The New York Times, The Village Voice, LA Weekly, and CTheory, which published one of his most popular pieces of writing, "The Turntable," a theory of the hip hop practice of scratching and sampling.

In addition to his journalistic career, Mudede is also a filmmaker and screenwriter. In 2019, he directed and co-wrote the feature film Thin Skin, about a jazz trumpeter in Seattle whose estranged Nigerian father re-enters his life. He has also co-written three independent films with director Robinson Devor. Police Beat (2005), adapted from Mudede's weekly column for The Stranger, follows a Muslim-American police officer on his bicycle patrol around Seattle. Zoo is a movie about the late Kenneth Pinyan and the Enumclaw stallion incident. Mudede also co-wrote Devor's film You Can't Win, starring Michael Pitt, based on the 1926 hobo memoir of the same name. The film was filmed in 2012 and released in February 2026. As an actor, Mudede played a priest in The Naked Proof, released in 2003.
