= Grimhaven =

Unpublished book manuscript by Charles Willeford

First page of the manuscript

Grimhaven is the manuscript for an unpublished book by hard-boiled crime writer Charles Willeford (1919–1988). Originally intended as Willeford's sequel to Miami Blues, the novel was deemed too dark for publication, and his agent refused to send it on to the publisher. The novel New Hope for the Dead was later written and published as the second book in the Hoke Moseley series.

A photocopy of the hand-typed manuscript is maintained in the Charles Willeford Archive at the Bienes Museum of the Modern Book in Fort Lauderdale, Florida. The holdings inventory notes: "as per Betsy Willeford [widow of the author]: 'Ms. of the "black Hoke Mosely" [sic], never published, sold to a small but ruthless group of collectors in the form of Xerox copies. May not be copied in the library by patrons who'll wholesale it on the Internet.'"

== Synopsis ==
The novel begins with Hoke Moseley having retired from the Miami police force to work at his father Frank Moseley's hardware store in Riviera Beach, Florida, in exchange for a free apartment at the beach on Singer Island and a small paycheck. He makes himself useful by organizing the store and cleaning up, though he does not want to interact with customers in his new simplified life. In the wake of his career with the Miami police department, the more mindless the task, the better Hoke likes it.

Hoke has simplified and streamlined his life with a very strict and frugal regimen. He has a sparsely furnished apartment at the beach in a tourist area where he goes for a swim and a run every day after work. He has two yellow poplin jumper suits, one of which he wears and washes by hand every day with the other remaining in reserve. He has almost no possessions and sleeps on an army cot. His spartan diet consists of cooking a pot of beef stew or chili every Sunday to last a week of dinners, with an apple each day for dessert. His routine breakfast is a poached egg, one slice of rye toast, and several cups of Cuban espresso. His daily lunch consists of a hard boiled egg and an apple, supplemented with a thermos of coffee. Instead of owning a radio or a television, he works through a book of beginner chess problems after dinner each night.

Hoke's idyllic and simple life is brought to a sudden halt by the unexpected arrival of his daughters Sue Ellen and Aileen at his apartment. His ex-wife Patsy abandons them to Hoke's care while she moves to California with her professional baseball player boyfriend, Curly Peterson. Hoke immediately begins adjusting his plans. Because Sue Ellen is sixteen, he says that she is "finished with high school" and should immediately get a job to help out with the finances. Aileen is legally obligated to continue school, so her job will be maintaining the house and preparing meals for the three of them.

Hoke is informed by his father that he and his wife Helen will be going on a three-month-long cruise around the world and that Hoke needs to take care of the hardware store in his absence. His father offers financial help, but Hoke refuses. His father even offers to let them stay in his house while they are away, but Hoke refuses on the grounds that the girls should go ahead and become accustomed to their new lives of austerity. Hoke's balanced life is starting to fray around the edges, as is evidenced by a tension headache emerging during his evening run, something he had not experienced since he was on the police force. After a terrible meal of overcooked stew prepared by Aileen, he realizes that he has greatly over-estimated the maturity and abilities of both his daughters, that the situation is not going to work, and that he does not know what to do about it.

The first weekend with the girls begins with Hoke manning the hardware store by himself while the girls unpack their things and adjust to their new surroundings. Lunch is prepared by the time he gets home and the three make a trip to the laundromat. Aileen complains about her braces being uncomfortable, and rather than take her to a dentist, Hoke makes arrangements with his pilot neighbor, Bobby Stukes, to remove them that evening. He has Stukes pretend to have been a dentist in the Air Force. They drug Aileen with some Tylenol 3 and half a Valium before snipping all the braces out of her mouth.

After finishing the dental work, Hoke and Bobby take a swim in the ocean and then go to the Green House beer garden nearby and have a conversation on a variety of topics, the most significant of which reveals the reason for Hoke's early retirement from police work. Hoke explains that he had to kill someone in the line of duty and he enjoyed it so much that scared him. After returning home from the Green House, the three Moseleys have a sad dinner of leftover stew while Hoke brutally explains the birds and the bees to the girls and the rules regarding sexual conduct in their new home. After dinner, they collect discarded bottles on the beach to return for the deposit money.

On Sunday Hoke leaves the girls to their own devices and spends some time in the solitude of the closed hardware store. He ponders options for adjusting to this new situation in his life and makes careful plans on a legal pad before tearing the sheet up and disposing of it in the toilet. The evening is spent having Sunday dinner with the girls at his father's house. His father blindsides him by having the local Riviera Beach police chief there to offer him a better paying job as a lieutenant in charge of the detective division. His father is concerned about Hoke's financial ability to continue raising the girls. Regardless of the good offer, Hoke is determined not to do police work any more. Frank's wife Helen implores Hoke to live in the house with the girls while they are away on their three-month cruise, but Hoke maintains that they will not stay there. The girls balk and argue with Hoke and they have a tense ride home.

That evening, Hoke kills his two daughters. In preparation, he turns the air conditioner down to seventy degrees and has a Aileen write a note in her own handwriting saying that they have decided to go live with their mother in California. After the girls are asleep, he waits on the porch smoking the rest of Sue Ellen's cigarettes until his neighbor Bobby Stukes comes home. He has several drinks of bourbon at Bobby's house and then sits out on his porch until very late in the night. At 3:00 AM, he enters the girls' room and strangles them in their sleeping bags, breaking the little finger on his right hand in the process. He wraps the two corpses in trash bags and stows them in the closet. He makes himself a sandwich from the leftover stew meat and heads to the hardware store at 6:00 AM.

The day after the murder is spent visiting the Riviera Beach police chief to inform him that Hoke will not be taking the job since his daughters have decided to return to their mother in California. He shows the note Aileen wrote to the police chief and explains that they were gone when he woke up that morning. Hoke tells the same basic story to his father later in the morning. That afternoon Hoke goes to the doctor to have his broken finger reset, explaining that he broke it while closing the door of his truck. On the way home, he realizes that there is no air conditioning vent in the closet, so he gets four fifty-pound blocks of ice and moves the corpses into the shower stall with the ice. He spends the next several days attempting to return to his old routine with varied amounts of success.

On Saturday morning, Hoke drives his father and Helen to Port Everglades to board their cruise ship. On returning to Riviera Beach, Hoke goes to the hardware store and fills out a company check to himself for $3000. He spends the afternoon having a casual meal at a restaurant and then goes to see the movie Death Hunt before stopping by his father's house to turn the air conditioner down to sixty degrees. At 10:00 PM he moves the body bags to his truck, realizing they are somewhat waterlogged due to the fact he had not removed them when he took his daily showers. He drives the bodies to his father's house and brings them in through the garage and seals them up as best he can under sheets in the master bed in order to suppress the smell. He spends the next several days relaxing in his father's house before leaving town on U.S. Highway 1 on the way to California.

What follows is an account of every meal Hoke eats, every hotel, motel, or boarding house he stays in, and several minor interactions with other people on his week-long drive to California in his truck. Once in Los Angeles, Hoke arbitrarily picks a lawyer named Juan Peralta from an office building registry and hires him on retainer so that he will have someone to call when he is arrested. After securing the lawyer's services, Hoke drives to a Sears store to purchase a double-barreled shotgun and some shells on his way to Glendale, where Patsy and Curly Peterson live on Eucalyptus Avenue in the Verdugo Woodlands.

Hoke scopes out the house before having lunch in downtown Glendale and seeing the movie Local Hero at the Rialto Theater. Upon returning to his parking space, he finds that his truck has been stolen from the lot. A policeman named Arthur Arthur attempts to help find the truck, and they drive together around Glendale looking for it. Finally the policeman drops Hoke off at Patsy's and Curly's house. Hoke and Patsy have a conversation on the front porch before he forces his way into the house. Hoke waits smoking cigarettes and drinking a beer Patsy brings him in the study while some guests leave. He finds a letter opener in a desk and hides it in the back pocket of his jumpsuit.

When Curly and Patsy enter the room, Hoke botches an attempt to kill Curly with the letter opener. Curly overpowers him and ends up kicking the false teeth out of his mouth. Curly has no interest in involving the police, but police officer Arthur arrives back at the house to let Hoke know his truck has been found. Hoke makes a hasty exit with the officer and goes to retrieve his car where the ignition is being repaired at a garage. He then drives south of town on U.S. Highway 101 to Seal Beach, where he checks into a motel to spend his final few days before being apprehended by the police. His reasoning for the crime spree is the solitude he will find on Death Row until he is executed, enjoying the privacy of a single cell, working on his chess problems and reading, left to his own devices.
