= The Burnt Orange Heresy =

2019 crime thriller film

- Theatrical release poster
- Directed by: Giuseppe Capotondi
- Screenplay by: Scott Smith
- Based on: The Burnt Orange Heresy by Charles Willeford
- Produced by: William Horberg; David Lancaster; David Zander
- Starring: Claes Bang; Elizabeth Debicki; Mick Jagger; Donald Sutherland
- Cinematography: David Ungaro
- Edited by: Guido Notari
- Music by: Craig Armstrong
- Production companies: Indiana Production; MJZ; Rumble Films; Wonderful Films; Carte Blanche Cinema; HanWay Films; Ingenious
- Distributed by: Sony Pictures Classics
- Release dates: September 7, 2019 (Venice); March 6, 2020 (United States)
- Running time: 98 minutes
- Countries: United States; Italy
- Language: English
- Box office: $711,691

The Burnt Orange Heresy is a 2019 crime thriller film directed by Giuseppe Capotondi and with a screenplay by Scott Smith. The film is based on the book of the same name by Charles Willeford and stars Claes Bang, Elizabeth Debicki, Mick Jagger, and Donald Sutherland.

The Burnt Orange Heresy was selected as the closing film at the 76th Venice International Film Festival and was released on March 6, 2020, by Sony Pictures Classics.

== Synopsis ==
Art critic James Figueras is enlisted by wealthy art dealer Joseph Cassidy to steal a painting from reclusive painter Jerome Debney.

== Cast ==
- Claes Bang as James Figueras
- Elizabeth Debicki as Berenice Hollis
- Mick Jagger as Joseph Cassidy
- Donald Sutherland as Jerome Debney
- Rosalind Halstead as Evelina Macri
- Alessandro Fabrizi as Rodolfo

== Production ==
In February 2018, Elizabeth Debicki and Christopher Walken were cast in the film adaptation of Charles Willeford's book The Burnt Orange Heresy, to play Berenice Hollis and artist Jerome Debney, respectively. In April 2018, Claes Bang joined the film to play the lead role of James Figueras, a fiercely ambitious art critic and thief. In early September 2018, Mick Jagger was cast to play Joseph Cassidy, an art dealer. In late September 2018, Donald Sutherland was cast in the film, replacing Walken, to play an enigmatic painter who becomes the target of an art-world heist.

Principal photography on the film began late September 2018 at Lake Como, Italy.

== Release ==
The film had its world premiere at the Venice International Film Festival on September 7, 2019. A week later, Sony Pictures Classics acquired distribution rights in all media excluding airlines to the film for North and Latin America, the UK, Australia, New Zealand, South Africa, Germany, Switzerland and Thailand. It was released on March 6, 2020. Following the closure of theaters a week later due to the COVID-19 pandemic, Sony Pictures Classics opted to hold the film for when theaters re-open instead of putting the film on digital platforms. It was re-released on August 7, 2020.

== Critical reception ==
On Rotten Tomatoes, the film holds a 66% approval rating based on 119 reviews, with an average rating of 6.1/10. The website's critics consensus reads, "The Burnt Orange Heresy has a certain stylish charm, even if -- much like the art world it depicts -- it'll strike some viewers as pretentious." On Metacritic, the film holds a rating of 57 out of 100, based on reviews from 26 critics, indicating "mixed or average reviews".

The Boston Herald notes that the fraudulent artist adds the image of a fly to each of his paintings, "a metaphor for sin and evil"; the image recurs throughout "this dark fable".
