= Shoes (1916 film) =

1916 film by Lois Weber

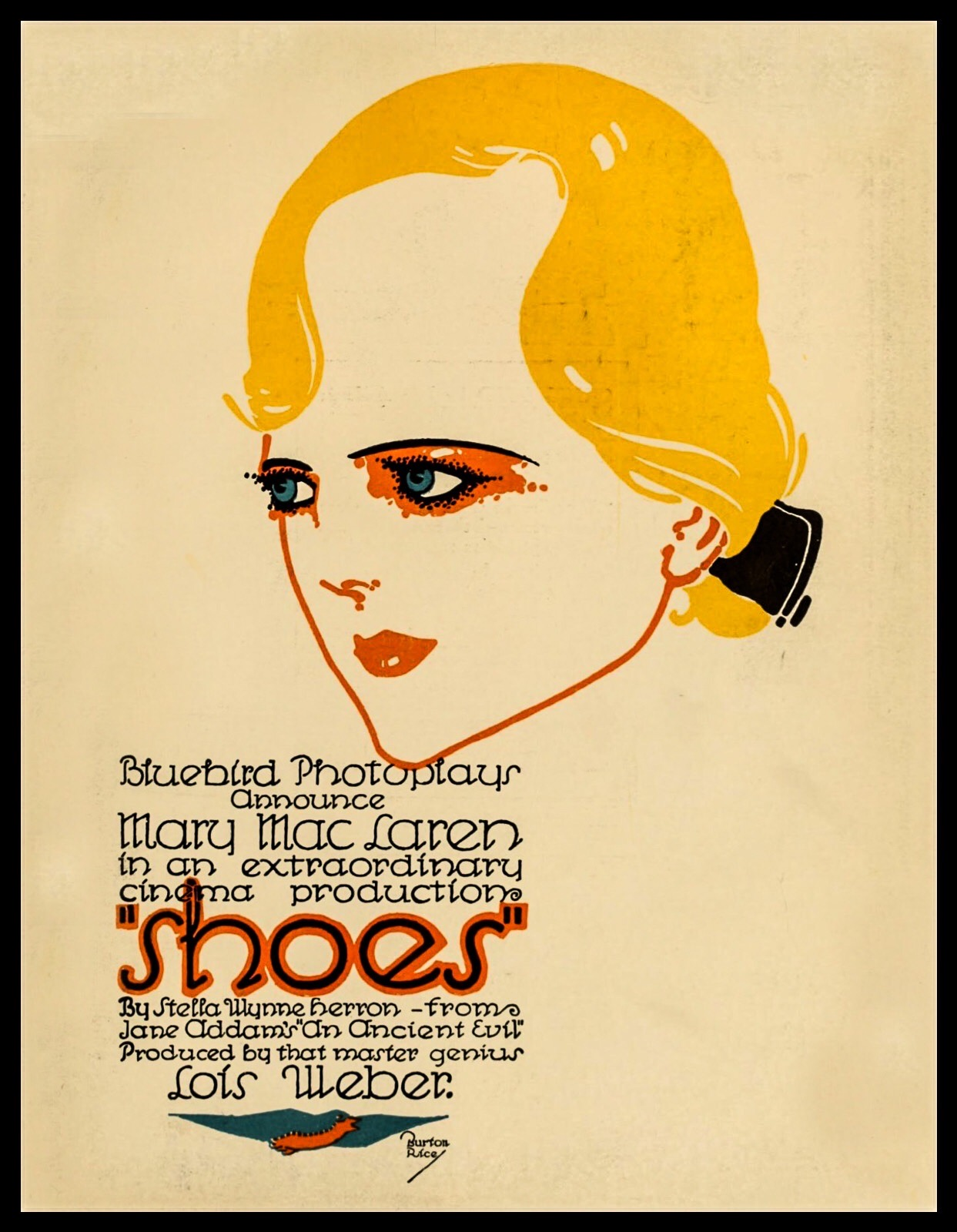
- Design by Burton Rice used for theatrical posters and trade journal inserts, 1916
- Directed by: Lois Weber
- Written by: Lois Weber (scenario)
- Based on: Short story by Stella Wynne Herron, derived from a book by Jane Addams
- Produced by: Bluebird Photoplays
- Starring: Mary MacLaren
- Cinematography: Stephen S. Norton; Allen G. Siegler; King Gray
- Distributed by: Universal Film Manufacturing Company
- Release date: June 26, 1916
- Running time: 60 minutes (5 reels)
- Country: United States
- Languages: Silent film English intertitles

Shoes is a 1916 silent drama film directed by Lois Weber and starring Mary MacLaren. It was distributed by the Universal Film Manufacturing Company and produced by Bluebird Photoplays, a subsidiary of Universal based in New York City and with access to Universal's studio facilities in Fort Lee, New Jersey as well as in California. In 2014, Shoes was selected for preservation in the National Film Registry by the Library of Congress.

The film was held and restored by the EYE Film Institute Netherlands between 2008 and 2011. It is available on DVD and Blu-ray with a score composed by Donald Sosin and Mimi Rabson and audio commentary by film historian Shelley Stamp.

== Plot ==
This flower had not had a fair chance to bloom in the garden of life. The worm of poverty had entered the folded bud and spoiled it.

— Intertitle from Shoes

Eva Mayer works in a five-and-dime store for five dollars a week. That meager salary must solely support her family of two parents and three sisters because her father prefers to lie in bed reading, smoking his pipe, and drinking pails of beer rather than looking for work. After working throughout the week, Eva returns home to offer her mother what little money she has earned. The money is barely enough to pay for food for her family. Eva desperately needs new shoes. The only pair she has are literally falling to pieces with soles that have large holes, so large in fact that she must insert pieces of cardboard inside her shoes to protect her feet. Finally, Eva decides to sleep with Charlie, a local cabaret singer, in exchange for money. She buys new shoes but learns the same day that her father has finally secured a job, at least temporary work.

== Cast ==
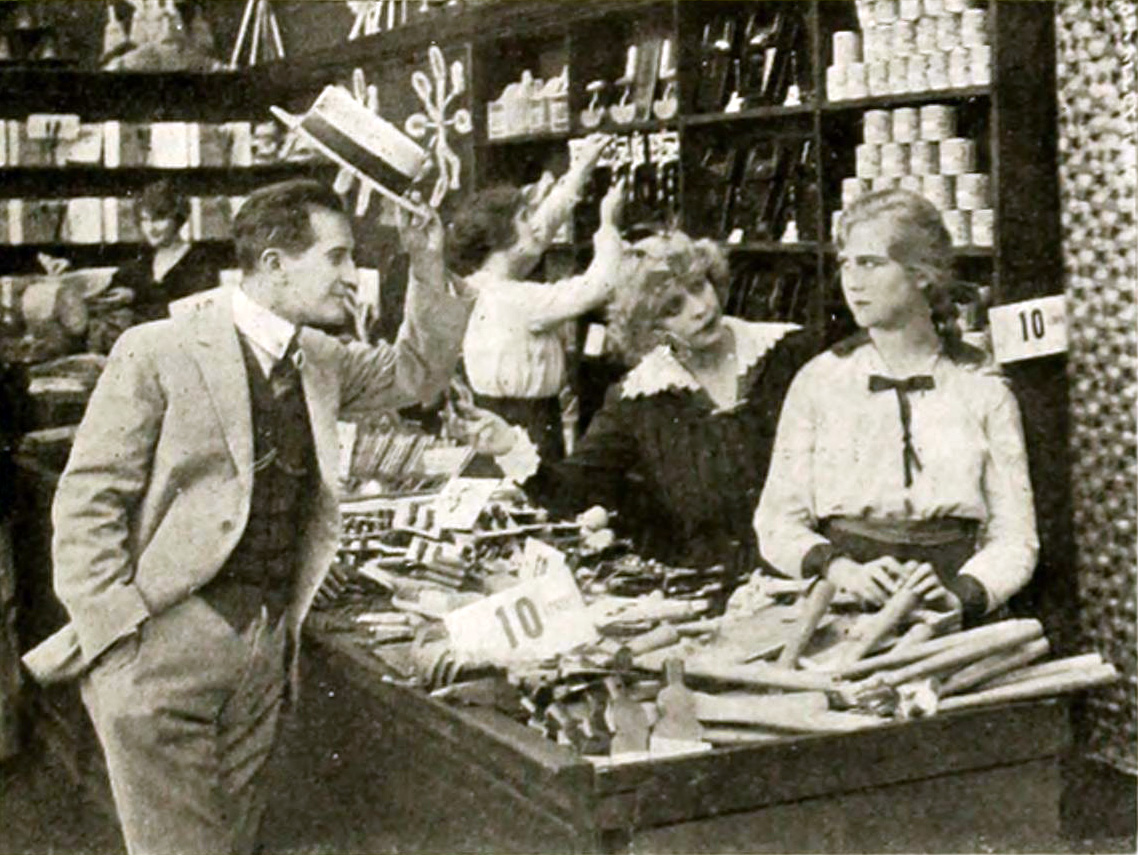
Film still showing (from left) "Cabaret" Charlie (Mong), Lil (Arnold), and Eva Mayer (MacLaren)

- Mary MacLaren – Eva Mayer
- Harry Griffith – Eva's father
- Mattie Witting – Eva's mother (credited as Mrs. A. E. Witting)
- Jessie Arnold – Lil, co-worker at store
- William V. Mong – "Cabaret" Charlie
- Lina Basquette – Eva's sister (uncredited)

== Production ==
In addition to directing the film, Lois Weber composed the production's scenario, adapting it from a short story written by American author and suffragist Stella Wynne Herron. That story, also titled "Shoes", was originally published—complete with illustrations by Hal J. Mowat—in the January 1, 1916, issue of Collier's magazine. Herron, in turn, was inspired to write her dramatic tale about a poor young woman desperately needing shoes by Jane Addams' 1912 nonfiction book on prostitution, A New Conscience and an Ancient Evil. In fact, for the epigraph of her short story, Herron quotes directly from Addams' work: "When the shoes became too worn to endure a third soling and she possessed but 90 cents toward a new pair, she gave up the struggle; to use her own contemptuous phrase, she 'sold out for a new pair of shoes.'"

Weber in her screen adaptation followed closely Herron's narrative, with "dialogue from the story occasionally appearing verbatim in the film's intertitles." Weber did, though, make some obvious as well as subtle changes to lengthen the short story to a one-hour film. The director, largely in keeping with Herron's original story, also introduces the central character in her film as "Eva Mayer" and to her family as "the Mayers". Yet, references to the characters in 1916 publications and in modern film references often cite Eva's surname as "Meyer".

=== Casting the film's lead ===
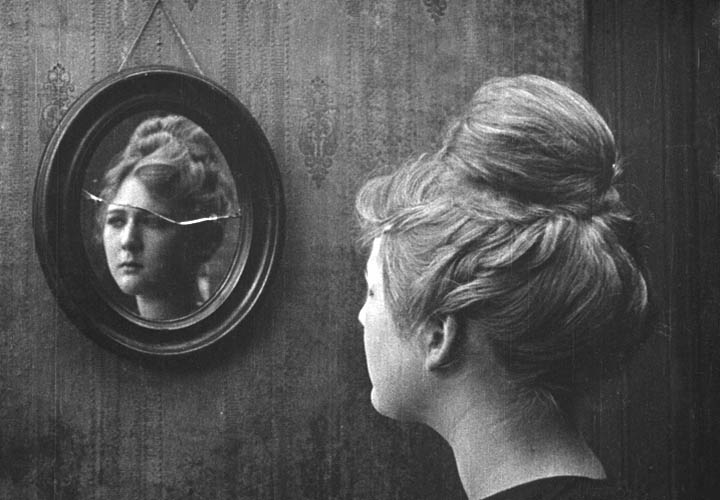
Another scene with MacLaren as Eva

According to news items in 1916 film publications, while Lois Weber was still working on the scenario for Shoes, she met 16-year-old Mary MacDonald in the early weeks of 1916, when the young chorus girl was with a group of other women looking for work as extras at Universal Studios in California. Weber was reportedly "impressed by her style and peculiar type of beauty", so much so that the director gave Mary uncredited bit parts in two productions: John Needham's Double, which was released in April 1916, and Where Are My Children?, released in May. Weber also kept her in mind as a possible choice for the role of Eva in Shoes. A few weeks later, after Weber finally decided to cast the inexperienced screen performer for the starring role in Shoes, the director assigned MacDonald a new surname for promoting and crediting her work: MacLaren (spelled McLaren in the film's opening title card). Many studio observers in the media in 1916 expressed amazement regarding the actress's meteoric rise to stardom. The Baltimore Sun newspaper attributed her "sudden fame" to the "whims of fortune". Commenting too about such good fortune, the New York-based trade journal The Moving Picture World stated, "Mary MacLaren is a mighty lucky young lady to have Lois Weber sponsoring her future upon the screen...she is a full-fledged star in about the fastest time known to screen history."

=== Set composition ===
Weber in filming Shoes utilized fully furnished interior sets at the studio rather than partially constructed "corner sets". As was customary in her productions, Weber created authentic-looking settings for a dual purpose: to enhance the story's appearance on screen and to enhance the performances of her cast by immersing the actors in environments with "physical and psychological realism". The trade journal The Moving Picture Weekly was one of the publications in 1916 that described the principal sets used on Shoes:

A cut version of Shoes with English intertitles and French subtitles (48 minutes)

The production is made with all the skill and attention to detail which we have learned to expect from Lois Weber. The contents of a whole five and ten cent store was transported to the studio in order to film the store scenes. Real corned beef and cabbage were cooked on a real stove, with real fire in it, and the furniture which was used in the interior of the Meyer [sic] home was specially bought from just such people as the Myers [sic] were.

== Release and reception ==
Released on June 26, 1916, the film became Universal's most-booked Bluebird production by regional distributors and theaters. It also received that year widespread public acclaim, including positive reviews from critics in trade publications and in many newspapers across the country. Prior to the film's release, the New York-based trade journal Motion Picture News reported comments expressed by H. M. Hoffman, the general manager of Bluebird Photoplays, who predicted great success for his studio's new motion picture. "I am willing", he stated, "to stake "Bluebird's reputation and my own, upon the outcome of this release." Hoffman further predicted, "It will be the most discussed and most profitable feature ever released during a program series."

Reviews in 1916 appear to justify the Bluebird manager's confident expectations. In its July 3 edition that year, the San Francisco Chronicle describes the drama as "absorbing" and its cast "capable" and "well-balanced". The newspaper underscores too the cultural significance of the film, calling it "one of the most important sociological plays presented on the screen." Grace Kingsley, reviewing the film on behalf of the Los Angeles Times, heaped even greater praise on the release:

Shoes showing at the Alhambra is the greatest photoplay which Lois Weber has ever produced. All praise to its perfection of acting by Mary MacLaren and the others. All praise to the fact that every atom of its fine-drawn drama grows out of the hearts, the lives, and motives of real human beings. And more praise yet that a stark story of poverty, stripped of every cheap trick of appeal, is yet so sincere, so gripping, that it holds you as no such simple screen tale perhaps ever has gripped before.

In Illinois, Louella Parsons, the film critic for The Chicago Herald, ranked Shoes as "one of the best moving pictures of 1916", a story that "loosens the heartstrings, stirs the pulse and makes one choke with emotion." The co-editor of the widely read entertainment paperVariety had a more measured response to the drama. Writing under the pen name "Jolo", Joshua Lowe characterized the tragic story as "devoid of all theatricalism" and "far above the average of Bluebird releases." Lowe noted in particular that Mary MacLaren "gave an exceptionally good portrayal of the hopeless creature."

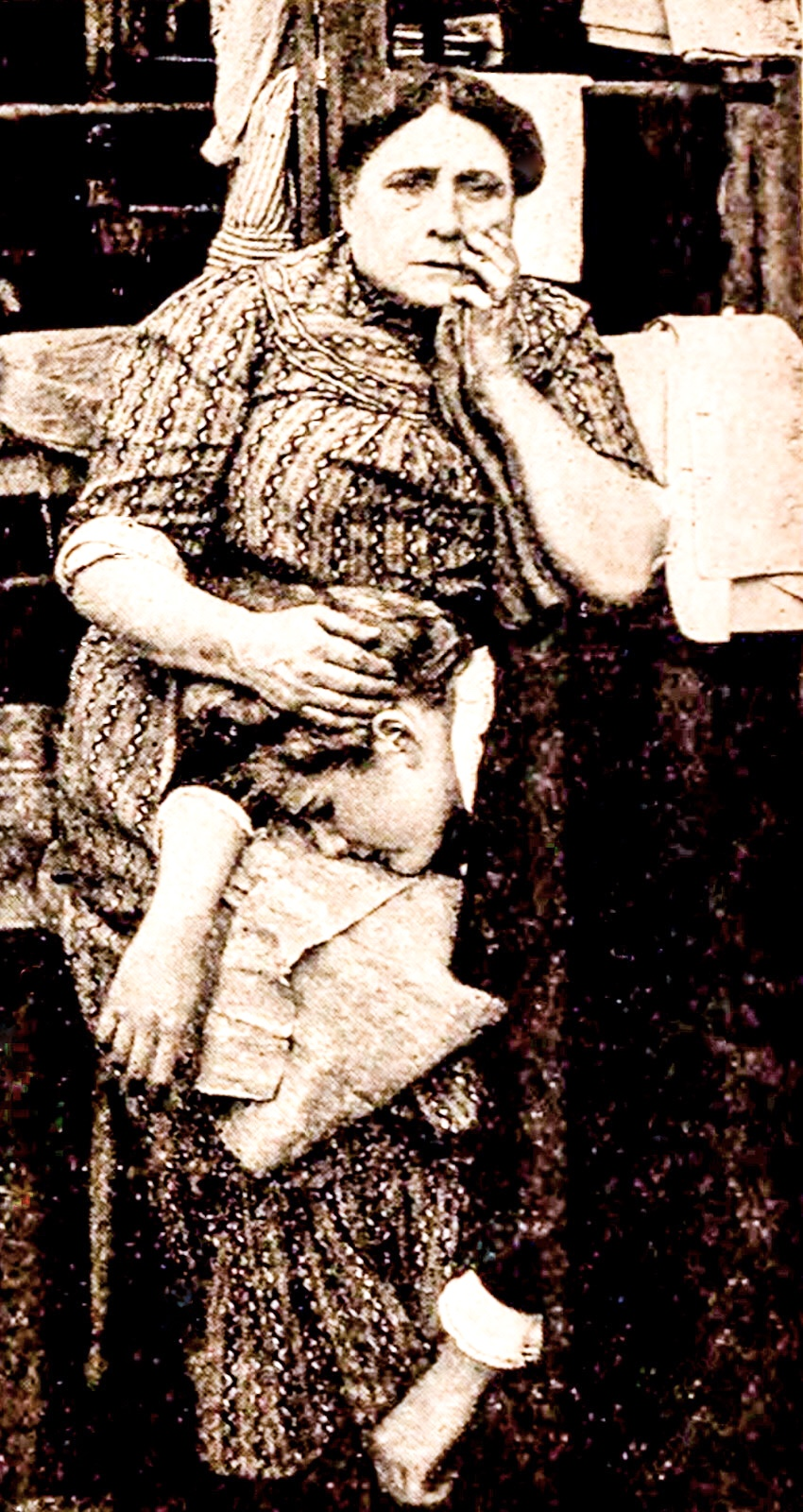
Mrs. Mayer (Mattie Witting) comforting her daughter (MacLaren)

Beyond recognizing and describing the broader cultural significance of the film, some newspapers in 1916 urged their readers, especially parents, to see the photoplay for simply the benefit of their own households. The Chicago Defender, one of the leading African-American newspapers in the United States, was among those periodicals promoting that benefit: "There is a lesson in this feature for every father and mother who have made themselves responsible for the welfare of a daughter—it expounds the greatest problem ever essayed in moving pictures and does it deftly, clearly and with gripping interest."

Praise for the film, however, was not universal in the media in 1916. Peter Milne, the reviewer for Motion Picture News, insisted that Weber had exceeded acceptable limits for realism in depicting Eva's "trials and hardships". "Miss Weber", he observes in his June 24 assessment of the film, "has gone a step too far in showing a closeup of the girl extracting splinters from the sole of her foot", as well as "showing the girl scraping mud from her feet with a pair of scissors." Milne then adds, "There is such a thing as being too realistic." Julian Johnson, writing for the leading movie-fan magazine Photoplay, summarized Weber's "remarkable play" as being "big in thought and treatment—marred by melodramatic crudities."

== Parody of Shoes, 1932 ==
In 1932—sixteen years after the release of Shoes—Universal Studios produced a parody of Weber's film, converting it to a sound comedy short by re-editing original footage from the 1916 drama and using voiceovers by a "great wisecracker" to amuse theater audiences. The sound "novelty", titled The Unshod Maiden, was directed by Albert DeMond, who also wrote the satirical narration for the 10-minute film. In its positive review of the short in March 1932, The Film Daily alludes to neither Weber nor Shoes, but the trade paper's synopsis of the comedy's plot clearly shows that it mirrors the storyline of the 1916 feature:

[The short] concerns Mary, a pathetic little shop girl, who, because she is obliged to turn over her meagre earnings to her unworthy family, hasn't the price of a pair of shoes. And she needs shoes! Another clerk in the store introduces her to a smooth villain, and the last scene shows Mary arriving home tearful but with a brand new pair of 12-button shoes.

In the weeks prior to the official release of The Unshod Maiden, screenings of the comedy were presented by Universal at private gatherings and in select theaters. Motion Picture Herald, another popular film-industry publication in 1932, reports on DeMond's parody in its February 20 issue and refers directly to the original footage and to the star of Shoes but mentions nothing about Weber:

Universal's Unshod Maiden created a furore when shown to a private audience of local critics and newspapermen recently, which indicates that Universal may have a gold mine in this contemplated series of short subjects burlesquing old-time films. This offering was taken from Mary McLaren's famous picture "Shoes" with scenes of that picture used all the way through, while a wit describes the action as it would be presented on the screen today...A series of 52 such subjects are planned for this year with Al De Mond as producer and editor.
