= The Woman Chaser =

- Directed by: Robinson Devor
- Written by: Robinson Devor; Charles Willeford
- Based on: The Woman Chaser by Charles Willeford
- Produced by: Soly Haim
- Starring: Patrick Warburton; Ron Morgan; Emily Newman; Paul Malevich; Marilyn Rising
- Cinematography: Kramer Morgenthau
- Edited by: Mark Winitsky
- Music by: Daniele Luppi; Jeff McDonough
- Distributed by: Tarmac Films
- Release dates: October 8, 1999 (NYFF); June 16, 2000 (United States)
- Running time: 90 minutes
- Country: United States
- Language: English
- Budget: $700,000

The Woman Chaser is a 1999 film directed by Robinson Devor and starring Patrick Warburton, Ron Morgan, Emily Newman, Paul Malevich, and Marilyn Rising. The screenplay is based on the novel of the same name by Charles Willeford.

== Plot ==
Set in Los Angeles in 1960, Richard Hudson is a shrewd car dealer who moves from San Francisco and sets up a used-car dealership. Tiring of this job, he turns the lot over to an assistant Bill and starts writing his first film, The Man Who Got Away. It turns out to be an uncommercial picture, chronicling the story of a truck driver who goes berserk, runs over a little girl and dies fending off a platoon of police officers.

In making his film, Richard enlists the help of his father-in-law, Leo, a washed-up former film director whose notable possession is a Rouault painting of a clown. Through Leo, Richard pitches his idea to The Man, the unnamed chief executive of Mammoth Pictures who green-lights the project. Conflict inevitably arises when Richard's obsession for making the movie his way clashes with The Man's. Other kooky characters include Richard's mother, a former ballerina who lures her hirsute lug of a son into a comically eccentric pas de deux; Richard's sexually curious stepsister, Becky, who seduces him; and his secretary, Laura, whom he impregnates with a boorish indifference.

== Cast ==
- Patrick Warburton as Richard Hudson
  - Josh Hammond as young Richard
- Eugene Roche as Used Car Dealer
- Ron Morgan as Bill
- Emily Newman as Laura
- Marilyn Rising as Becky
- Paul Malevich as Leo
- Lynette Bennett as Mother
- Joe Durrenberger as Chet
- Ernie Vincent as The Man

== Release ==
The Woman Chaser premiered at the 1999 New York Film Festival and went on to play at top film festivals including the Sundance Film Festival, South By Southwest, the Florida Film Festival, the Seattle International Film Festival, Stockholm Film Festival, and Athens Film Festival.

On June 16, 2000, it was given a limited theatrical release in North America, with 3 minutes of material being removed for the wide release version. It was also broadcast on the Sundance Channel and Showtime, becoming a cult movie.

The film went unreleased on DVD for many years due to music rights issues. In 2014, the film was released digitally with half of the music replaced by an original score written by Hollywood film and television composer, Jeff McDonough, with the other half being written by original composer Daniele Luppi.

In August 2025, Vinegar Syndrome, through their Cinématographe sub-label, released the film on Blu-ray, utilizing a new 2K restoration and presenting the film in its original uncut 93-minute version, as originally shown at the New York Film Festival, for the first time on home video, with all originally licensed music from the theatrical release restored. The restored material includes a controversial scene where Hudson punches his pregnant girlfriend in the stomach; this scene occurs in the original novel, but was cut from the film for wide release. Additionally, this release included an alternate color version of the film, under the title The Art of Insanity.

== Reception ==
Clay Smith of The Austin Chronicle wrote, "The Woman Chaser is far from being a hollow genre exercise. At once hilarious, jagged, and nostalgic in all the best ways, The Woman Chaser is a refreshing breath of smoke-tinged, deadpan air. " Merle Bertrand of Film Threat called it "by turns ludicrously funny...and vaguely disturbing". Kevin Thomas of the Los Angeles Times wrote, "For all of Warburton’s prowess and Devor’s energy and zeal, The Woman Chaser lacks the slam-bang style and authority of Samuel Fuller’s Shock Corridor and The Naked Kiss, two films that The Woman Chaser brings immediately to mind. The Woman Chaser is very much a first film, but a venturesome start for Devor as well as a splendid launch for Warburton."

On review aggregator Rotten Tomatoes, The Woman Chaser has an approval rating of 71% based on 14 reviews. Metacritic, which uses a weighted average, assigned the film a score of 46 out of 100, based on 14 critics, indicating "mixed or average" reviews.

== Awards ==
SXSW Film Festival, 2000

- Winner, Audience Award for Narrative First Film - Robinson Devor

Florida Film Festival, 2000

- Winner, Special Jury Award for Best Narrative Feature - Robinson Devor
- Nominee, Grand Jury Award Best Narrative Feature - Robinson Devor

Sundance Film Festival, 2000

- Nominee for American Spectrum

Golden Trailer Awards, 2001

- Nominee, Golden Trailer Best Comedy - Tarmac Films
