= Richard Carmen =

American character actor

Richard Carmen (born July 1968 in Colorado Springs, Colorado) is an American character actor. He is known for his leading role in the 2007 Sundance film Zoo where he played the main character's brother. Richard also appeared in two short films featured on the Fox reality series On The Lot and a role in the 2009 horror movie Zombies of Mass Destruction which played at SIFF. Richard also starred as Vance in the horror movie The Taken (2010). In addition, he was an actor and assistant director in Bound to be Different (2011) and Eden (2012).
