= The Stranger (newspaper) =

Alternative biweekly newspaper in Seattle, Washington

- Type: Alternative weekly
- Format: Tabloid
- Owner: Brady Walkinshaw
- Publisher: Tracey Cataldo
- Founded: September 23, 1991; 35 years ago
- Political alignment: Progressive
- Headquarters: 1101 East Pike Street; Seattle, Washington 98126; U.S.
- ISSN: 1935-9004
- OCLC number: 27341179
- Website: thestranger.com

The Stranger is an alternative news and commentary publication in Seattle, Washington. Founded in 1991 by Tim Keck and cartoonist James Sturm, it has a progressive orientation. The paper's principal competitor was the Seattle Weekly until 2019 when the Weekly ceased print publication. Originally published weekly, The Stranger became biweekly in 2017 and suspended print publication during the COVID-19 pandemic in 2020, resuming publication of a quarterly arts magazine in March 2023 and further increasing its print issues in 2025. It also publishes online content and political endorsements for liberal or progressive candidates.

== History ==
The Stranger was founded in July 1991 by Tim Keck, who had previously co-founded the satirical newspaper The Onion, and cartoonist James Sturm. Its first issue was produced out of a home in Seattle's Wallingford neighborhood and was released on September 23, 1991. The newspaper's title reflected the fact that Keck had almost no connection to Seattle prior to launching the paper. In 1993, The Stranger relocated to Seattle's Capitol Hill district, where its offices remained until 2020. The Stranger's tagline is "Seattle's Only Newspaper" (a characterization alluding to its local ownership).

In its early days, The Stranger had a print run of 20,000, and focused on Seattle's University District. It was originally distributed as a single sheet of newsprint wrapped around a wad of coupons redeemable at local businesses.

Dan Savage was the Stranger's editor-in-chief from April 4, 2001, to September 2007. Associated with the paper since its inception, he made a national reputation writing the paper's sarcastic and sometimes inflammatory sex advice column, "Savage Love", which has since appeared in every issue of The Stranger. Savage became the paper's editorial director in 2007, and was replaced as editor-in-chief by Christopher Frizzelle at that time.

Journalist Charles Mudede, current senior staff writer and former associate editor, had his weekly Police Beat column loosely adapted into a film of the same name, directed by its co-writer, Robinson Devor. It received mostly positive reviews, and was released in American cinemas in 2006. Mudede would continue collaborating with Devor on future projects, such as the documentary Zoo (2007).

Erica C. Barnett, who was an early news editor for the paper, was named reporter of the year in 2007 by Seattle's Municipal League.

On April 16, 2012, The Stranger won a Pulitzer Prize in the "feature writing" category, for "The Bravest Woman in Seattle", by Eli Sanders described as "a haunting story of a woman who survived a brutal attack that took the life of her partner, using the woman's brave courtroom testimony and the details of the crime to construct a moving narrative". The feature appeared in the June 15, 2011, edition. In 2014, columnist Jen Graves was a Pulitzer finalist for her criticism columns.

From at least 2013 until July 2024, The Stranger was owned by the Seattle-based Index Newspapers; it has been described as distinguishing itself from the Weekly by its continuous local ownership (as the Weekly has had non-local ownership since 1997). By 2015, the influence of the paper's endorsements in local elections, which reflect a left-leaning perspective was being felt.

The Stranger made the transition to a biweekly format with its September 27, 2017, issue. It was redesigned to include longer feature stories and printed on heavier paper stock similar to magazines. The paper was distributed to local businesses, newsstands, and newspaper boxes free of charge every other Wednesday. The offices of The Stranger moved from Capitol Hill to Seattle's Chinatown–International District in 2020.

In response to the COVID-19 pandemic, on March 13, 2020, The Stranger announced that, due to a dramatic decrease in income from loss of advertising revenue, it would suspend its print edition. COVID-19 triggered The Stranger to lay off eighteen of its employees, which reduced its writing department. A successful online fundraiser was then organized to keep The Stranger afloat. Printing resumed in March 2023 with a quarterly arts magazine, while regular editions remain suspended.

In July 2024, the paper and the related Portland Mercury were sold by Index Media to Noisy Creek, a Seattle-headquartered media company founded by Brady Walkinshaw, a former Grist CEO and state legislator. Index Media retained a 20 percent stake in the newspaper, while Walkinshaw had the largest share of the "about 20" individual investors in Noisy Creek. Former Rolling Stone editor Hannah Murphy Winter was named editor in chief.

The purchase of The Stranger by Noisy Creek was followed by the ouster of longtime news editor Rich Smith in October 2024, who was replaced by interim news editor Marcus Harrison Green, former Seattle Times columnist and founder of the independent South Seattle Emerald. In July 2026, Winter was fired after two years on the job.

== Awards programs ==
Since 2003, in association with the cigarette company Lucky Strike, and later the antismoking arts organization Art Patch, the newspaper has awarded the annual Stranger Genius Awards to four Seattle-area individuals and one Seattle-area arts organization. Besides the recognition, each winner receives a $5000 cash award and a cake. Winners of the award include the filmmaker James Longley, the filmmaker Lynn Shelton, the writer Sherman Alexie, the poet Heather McHugh, the novelist Stacey Levine, the actress Sarah Rudinoff, the experimental-theater collective Implied Violence, Strawberry Theatre Workshop, the artist Jeffry Mitchell, and the artist Wynne Greenwood. A party and rock show for the winners is held every fall; past Stranger Genius Award parties have been held at the downtown public library, Seattle Art Museum, and the Moore Theater.

== See also ==
- The Portland Mercury – The Stranger's sister publication, based out of Portland, Oregon
- List of newspapers in Washington (state)
