= Jack Black (author) =

American writer and criminal (1871–1932)

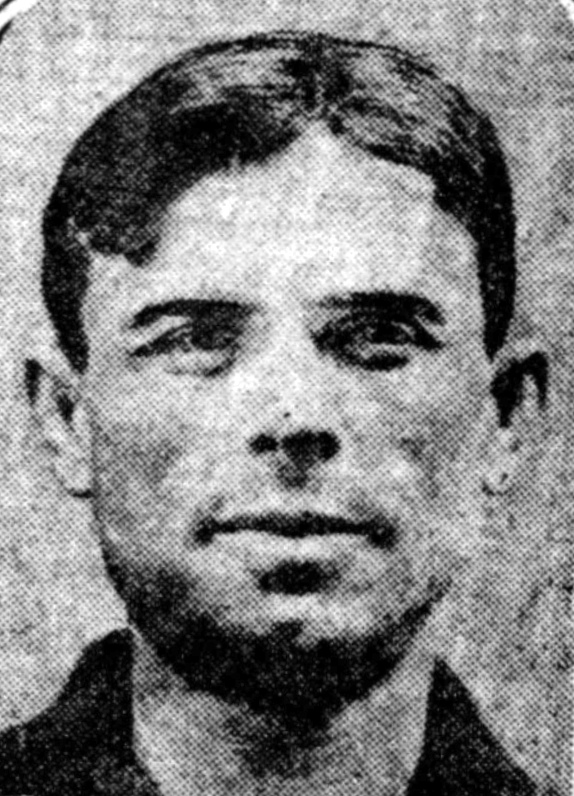
- Black in an undated photograph published in The San Francisco Call
- Born: 1871; New Westminster, British Columbia, Canada
- Disappeared: 1932 (aged 60-61)
- Status: Presumed dead by suicide
- Died: Unknown
- Other name: Blacky
- Citizenship: Canadian, American
- Occupation: Author
- Notable work: You Can't Win

Jack Black (1871–1932) was a Canadian and American hobo and burglar. Black is best known for his autobiography You Can't Win (Macmillan, 1926), describing his days on the road and life as an outlaw. Black's book was written as an anti-crime book urging criminals to go straight, but it is also his statement of belief in the futility of prisons and the criminal justice system, hence the title of the book. Jack Black was writing from experience, having spent thirty years (fifteen of which were spent in various prisons in Canada and the United States) as a travelling criminal, and offers tales of being a cross-country stick-up man, home burglar, petty thief, and opium addict. He gained fame as a prison reformer, writer, and playwright. He disappeared in 1932 in a likely suicide.

== Life ==
Black was born in 1871 in New Westminster, British Columbia, and was raised from infancy in the U.S. state of Missouri in the town of Maysville and eventually Kansas City. Aside from this, Jack Black is an essentially anonymous figure; even his actual name is uncertain. In his autobiographical book, he quotes his father as calling him "John," of which Jack is often a nickname. Some 1904 news articles name him as Jack Black, alias Tom Callahan, while a 1912 newspaper article names him Thomas Callaghan, alias Jack Black, and another gives his alias as Harry Klein. One of his nicknames among criminals was Blacky.

After his last spell in prison, Black became friends with wealthy patron Fremont Older and worked for his newspaper The San Francisco Call. Black wrote his autobiography with Rose Wilder Lane and eventually composed essays and lectured throughout the country on prison reform. He was also rumored to have received a stipend of $150 a week to draft a screenplay titled Salt Chunk Mary with co-author Bessie Beatty, based around the vagabond ally and fence of the same name in You Can't Win. The play flopped, although he was able to attain some amount of popularity, which subsided quickly.

His philosophy on life was especially influential to William S. Burroughs, who associated with similar characters in his early adulthood. He also mirrored the style of You Can't Win with his first published book, Junkie. In his foreword to the 1988 edition of You Can't Win (reproduced in a 2000 edition), Burroughs wrote:

I first read You Can't Win in 1926, in an edition bound in red cardboard. Stultified and confined by middle-class St. Louis mores, I was fascinated by this glimpse of an underworld of seedy rooming houses, pool parlors, cat houses and opium dens, of bull pens and cat burglars and hobo jungles. I learned about the Johnson Family of good bums and thieves, with a code of conduct that made more sense to me than the arbitrary, hypocritical rules that were taken for granted as being "right" by my peers.

== Disappearance ==
He disappeared in 1932 and is believed to have committed suicide by drowning, as he reportedly told his friends that if life got too grim, he would row out into New York Harbor and, with weights tied to his feet, drop overboard. In You Can't Win, Black describes this state of mind as being "ready for the river".

== Bibliography ==
- Black, Jack. You Can't Win. New York: Macmillan Company, 1926. Foreword by Robert Herrick. OCLC 238829961
- _____. You Can't Win: the Autobiography of Jack Black. New York: Amok Press, 1988. Foreword by William S. Burroughs. ISBN 0-941693-07-4 OCLC 153562506
- _____. Du kommst nicht durch. Berlin : Kramer, 1998. ISBN 3-87956-240-7 OCLC 75910135
- _____. You Can't Win. 2nd edition. Edinburgh: AK Press/Nabat books, 2000. ISBN 1-902593-02-2 OCLC 44737608
- _____. You Can't Win. [S.l.] : BN Publishing, 2007. ISBN 956-291-509-3 OCLC 187421471

== See also ==
- List of people who disappeared
