= Robinson Devor =

American film director

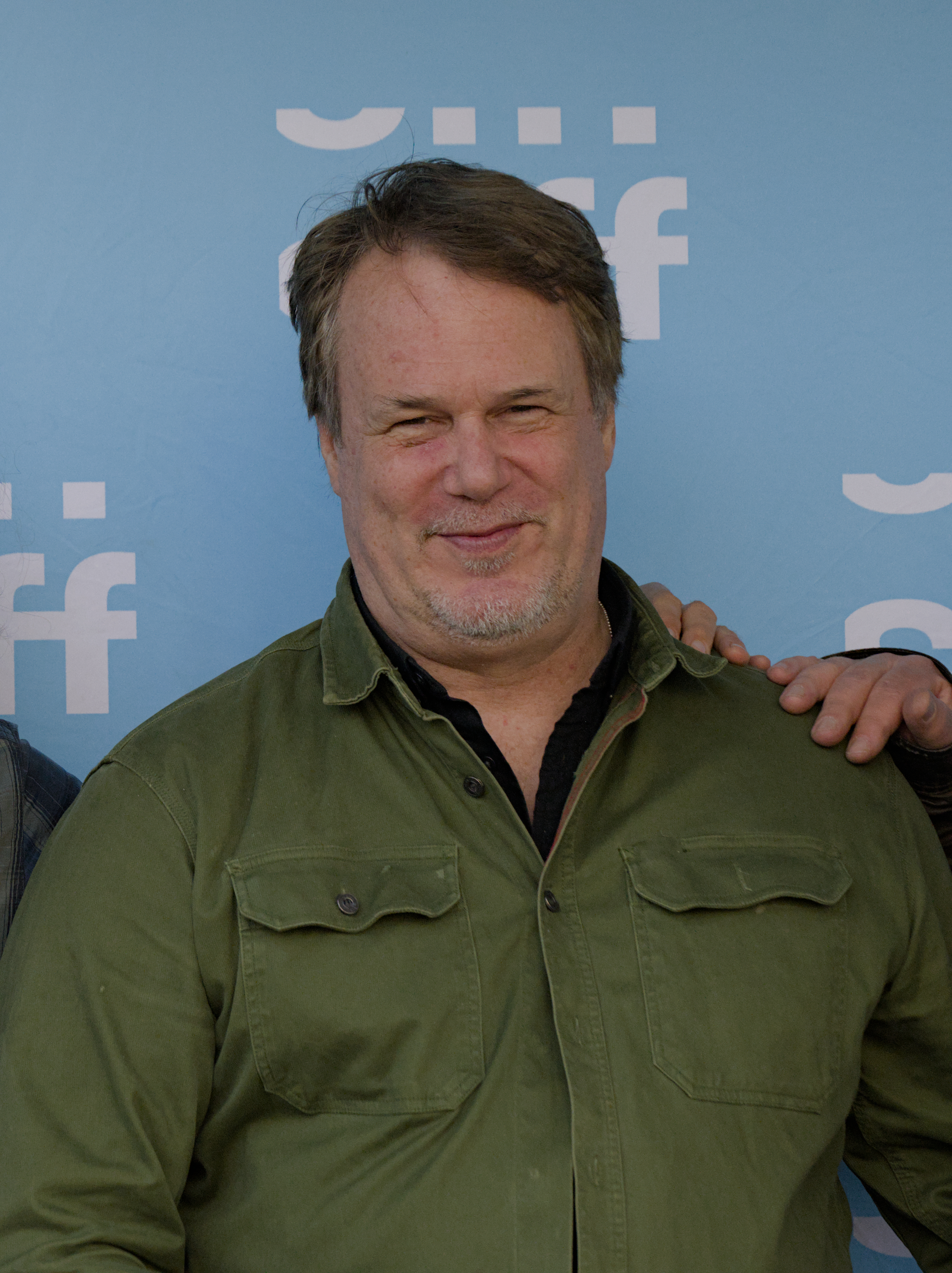
- Robinson Devor at SIFF 2025
- Occupations: Film director, screenwriter

Robinson Devor is an American film director, screenwriter and editor. He is also a film professor at Cornish College of the Arts. Devor has directed both documentaries as well as fiction films. His filmography includes narrative works such as The Woman Chaser (1999) and Police Beat (2005), and his documentary work includes Zoo (2007), Pow Wow (2018) and Suburban Fury (2024).

== Early life ==
Devor was raised in Westchester County, New York. After attaining his BFA in Film from SMU, Devor moved to Los Angeles, where he became a regular attendee at the New Beverly Cinema. He considered becoming a poet and applied to study under James Dickey at the University of South Carolina, but an unexpected job offer in Africa diverted him for a year. During that time he made enough money to edit the footage of his first documentary Angelyne (1995).

== Career ==
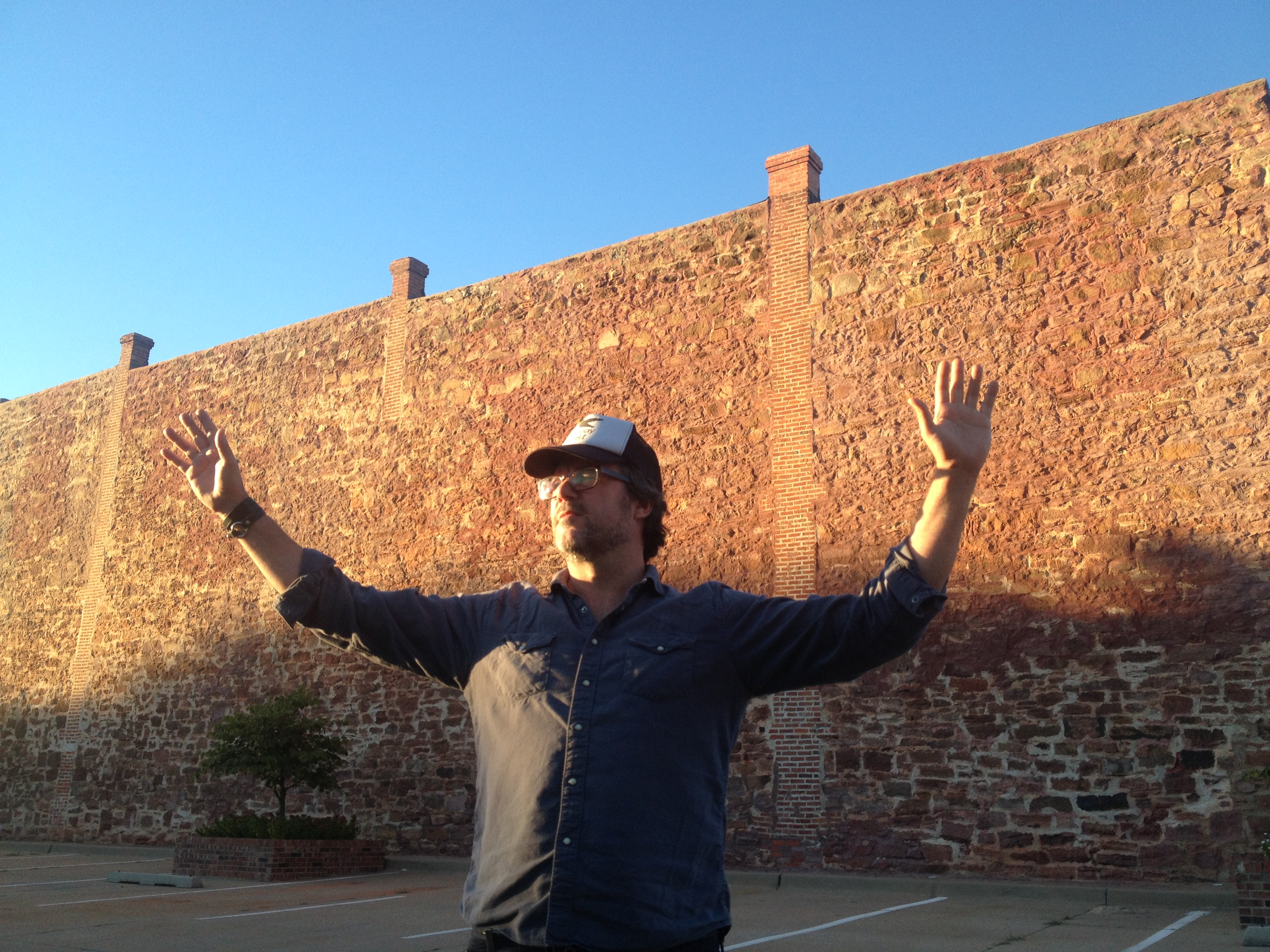
Devor on set in Oklahoma in 2013

=== Angelyne (1995) ===
Devor's first short documentary, Angelyne, was a half-hour, black and white 16 mm film co-directed by Michael Guccioni that captured a day in the life of the self-made LA billboard queen, Angelyne. Devor met Guccioni at a weekly avant-garde film night in Los Angeles, where the two chose to work on a collaborative project as co-directors. The film premiered at the 3rd New York Underground Film Festival, where The Village Voice noted that Angelyne's "weird charm is that it frames her in pin-up terms, following her at the oddly intimate distance that develops between masturbators and their favorite four-color posters."

=== The Woman Chaser (1999) ===
Devor's first feature film, The Woman Chaser, debuted at the 1999 New York Film Festival and then at Sundance. Devor had acquired the rights to the 1960 Charles Willeford novel and adapted the book into a screenplay. The story centers around a used car salesman who decides to become a film director. The film received critical high marks throughout its U.S. theatrical run and became a cult classic.

The Woman Chaser was released on VHS in Stereo in its black-and-white version in 2000 by Tribe Enterprises/The GLOBAL Asylum.

=== Police Beat (2005) ===
Devor's second feature film, Police Beat, was nominated for the Grand Prize at the 2005 Sundance Film Festival. The film was a loose adaptation of Charles Mudede’s weekly column, Police Beat, and focused on a Muslim-African born lovesick bike cop in Seattle. It was named one of the year's best films by Film Comment and Art Forum. It has been included in the permanent collection of the Museum of Modern Art.

=== Zoo (2007) ===
Devor's next documentary, Zoo, also a collaboration with Mudede, made its world premiere at the 2007 Sundance Film Festival, and then went on to play at the Cannes Film Festival in the Director's Fortnight Section. The film was based on a true story about a Seattle engineer who died while having sex with a horse. The film was named as "one of the Best 15 Documentaries of the 2000s" by Taste of Cinema.

=== Pow Wow (2018) ===
Devor's 2018 feature documentary Pow Wow: An Anthropological Study of the Members of the Indian Desert Country Club, a collaboration with writer Michael McConville, debuted at the Locarno Film Festival and then in the US at Lincoln Center (Art of the Real). It was named one of the best films of the year by Richard Brody of The New Yorker.

=== Suburban Fury (2024) ===
Devor ‘s latest documentary, Suburban Fury, debuted at the 2024 New York Film Festival and went on to win the Grand Prize for Documentaries at the 2025 Seattle International Film Festival. The film achieved a 100% percent Rotten Tomatoes score, with Variety calling it "a rapt documentary thriller".

=== You Can't Win (2026) ===
Devor directed an adaptation of the book of the same name by Jack Black. It was filmed in Port Townsend, Washington in May 2012 and released in February 2026.
