= Stella Wynne Herron =

Stella Wynne Herron (April 5, 1885 – March 1, 1966) was an American writer and suffragist whose work appeared in a variety of magazines, including Collier's, Sunset, and Weird Tales. She is most known for her 1916 short story "Shoes", which pioneering film director Lois Weber adapted into a film of the same name. The film is now considered a feminist classic in early cinema history.

== Early life and education ==
Estella "Stella" Frances Wynne was born on April 5, 1885, though some sources report the year as 1886. She grew up in San Francisco as the daughter of Irish immigrants. For college, she attended Stanford University and graduated in 1906. It was in school that she began her writing career. She worked as an associate editor for the university's journal 'The Stanford Sequoia', and her play, The Original Miss Tewksberry, was selected to be the senior farce for the 1906 school year. She also was an early member of the senior women's society "Cap and Gown", foreshadowing her later activism.

== Writing career ==
As detailed in The Writer, Herron's first piece to be accepted for publication was her short story "The Still of Ballywan." She had written it originally as a sophomore for a school assignment, and she had "written [it] hastily one night at the close of the term[.]" McClure's magazine went on to publish it in 1906. Over the following sixty years, Herron would go on to write many short stories, several plays, a serialized novel, and an illustrated book of protest poetry. Her work was sometimes republished in collected short story volumes. For example, 'The Americanizing of André François', was republished in 'Among the Humorists and After Dinner Speakers, Part Two'.

Two of her short stories, "Shoes" and "The Double Room Mystery", were also made into silent films, and filmmaker Thomas H. Ince bought the rights to her short story "An Adventurous Day" in 1920, though it never went into production. Ince paid Herron $500, a substantial figure at the time. She was known for her prize-winning stories in various magazines, including "An Adventurous Day", and one trade journal even reported that, "Her work received the personal compliments of the late Theodore Roosevelt."

== Personal life ==
She married William F. Herron, a newspaper writer (later attorney), on September 18, 1907 in Salinas. Eight years later, they had their only child, John Wynne Herron. Herron and her husband were divorced by 1920. From the mid-30s to the early forties, she lived in New York City as a poet, though she eventually returned to San Francisco.

Her activism included campaigning for women's suffrage in California in the 1910s, and one point she even worked as the Chairman for the College Equal Suffrage League. Her writing and activism connected her to many influential figures including journalist Alma Reed, who considered Herron a "lifelong friend", and painter José Clemente Orozco.

Herron died on March 1, 1966.

== Bibliography* ==
- The Still of Ballywan (short story) (1906)
- An Idyll of the Circle L. (short story) (1907)
- Cane and Coffee (short story) (1907)
- The Record Breaker (short story) (1907)
- The Americanizing of André François (short story) (1908)
- A Belated Boom (short story) (1910)
- Suffrage During N.E.A. Week (article) (1911)
- Palace Hotel (article) (1911/1913)
- The Ghost of the Almaden (short story) (1912)
- Minds Versus Millions (short story (1913)
- Shoes (short story) (1916)
- The Advent of the Majority (short story) (1916)
- Ashes of Youth (1917)
- The Ascidian (a drama in three acts) (1920)
- Mink Cape (short story) (1920)
- The Exiles of Corinto (short story) (1923)
- To a Parrakeet (poem) (1923)
- First Comes Commerce (short story) (1924)
- The Nob Hill Mystery (serialized novel) (1925)
- Ebony Magic (short story) (1928)
- The Strange Interlude (review) (1929)
- A Romance of Insurance (review) (1929)
- Manly P. Hall's Lectures on Ancient Philosophy (review) (1929)
- Bowery Parade and Other Poems of Protest (poetry collection) (1936)
- Entertainment at evening (dramatic composition) (1940)
- Hearndon House (a drama in three acts) (1946)
- My Faith (interview/article) (1948)
- Ten Blocks Away (a drama in three acts) (1958)
- An Adventurous Day (short story)**
- The Chinese Calendar (poem)**

*list incomplete*

**publication date unknown

== See also ==
- Cora Baggerly Older
- Eva Palmer-Sikelianos
