= Zoo (2007 film) =

2007 American documentary film by Robinson Devor

- Zoo movie poster
- Directed by: Robinson Devor
- Written by: Charles Mudede; Robinson Devor
- Produced by: Peggy Case; Alexis Ferris
- Starring: Richard Carmen; Paul Eenhoorn; Russell Hodgkinson; John Paulsen
- Cinematography: Sean Kirby
- Edited by: Joe Shapiro
- Music by: Paul Matthew Moore
- Distributed by: THINKFilm
- Release dates: January 18, 2007 (Sundance); April 25, 2007 (New York City)
- Running time: 80 minutes
- Country: United States
- Language: English
- Box office: $69,770

Zoo is a 2007 American documentary film based on the life and death of Kenneth Pinyan. This American man died of peritonitis due to perforation of the colon after engaging in receptive anal sex with a horse. The film combines audio testimony from people involved in the case or who were familiar with Pinyan, "with speculative re-enactments that feature a mix of actors and actual subjects".

The film's title refers to the subcultural term for a zoophile, a person with a sexual interest in animals. Zoo’s filmmakers intended to approach the film’s subject matter from a non-sensationalized perspective and chose to forego more lurid details, focusing instead on humanizing the people involved.

The film premiered at the Sundance Film Festival in January 2007, one of 16 documentaries accepted out of 857 candidates. Following Sundance, it was selected as one of five American films to be presented at the Directors' Fortnight sidebar at the 2007 Cannes Film Festival.

== Synopsis ==
In July 2005 near the small rural town of Enumclaw, Washington, Kenneth Pinyan also known as "Mr. Hands" died from internal injuries sustained while engaging in a sexual act with a horse. The police investigation of the incident led to the discovery of a network of zoophiles who held animal orgies at a local farm to have sex with horses. At the farm, the police seized videotapes and DVDs that showed several men engaging in sexual acts with the resident Arabian stallions, with one of them showing Kenneth Pinyan. At the time, Washington state had no laws concerning bestiality; in response to the case, the State Senate swiftly voted to criminalize bestiality in 2006. Animal cruelty charges were not filed against the participants because no evidence of injury to the horses was found. The videographer in the Pinyan incident, James Michael Tait, was charged with criminal trespassing.

Two Seattle-based filmmakers, Robinson Devor and Charles Mudede, curious about the type of people involved in the underground world of zoophilia, interviewed figures close to the case, including other members of the zoophile ring. The three zoophiles interviewed by the filmmakers are identified by their names in the online zoo community—Coyote, H, and the Happy Horseman. H was the man who organized the zoo gatherings. Only one zoo, Coyote, agreed to appear in the film's re-enactments.

Other interview subjects include Jenny Edwards, the founder of a local animal rescue organization who helped investigate potential animal abuse in the case, and legislators and local law enforcement officers.

== Production ==
On their reasoning for wanting to make a documentary about the Enumclaw case, Robinson Devor and Charles Mudede said when the news story first broke in 2005, it quickly became a punch line in the media. Said Mudede, "There seemed to be two responses: repulsion or laughter. People didn’t want to have any connection or identification with these men. Early on Rob and I said to each other, 'We’re going to revive their humanity.'"

Mudede noted, "It was only after Pinyan died when law enforcement looked for one way to punish his associates, that the legality of bestiality in Washington State became an issue [...] The prosecutor's office wanted to charge Tait with animal abuse, but the police found no evidence of abused animals on the many videotapes they collected from his home…the prosecutors could only charge Tait with trespassing."

Mudede, a journalist at The Stranger, had written an article about the incident and was contacted by one of the participants in the case. Of the participants, called "zoos", Mudede said "there was a desperate need to talk" and to tell their side of the story. Coyote, the only zoo that appears in the film, said he came to trust Devor to tell their story, saying "I felt in my gut he was not going to make an exploitive type of movie." When Zoo’s selection for the 2007 Sundance Film Festival was announced in December 2006, H, the farmhand who was the host of the men’s get-togethers, contacted Devor and consented to an audio interview, which Devor edited into the film.

Devor said the film’s biggest challenge was finding locations to shoot, as horse farms in the Seattle area did not want to be associated with the documentary. Said Devor, "Owners would say things like: 'We have Microsoft picnics here. They’re going to think it happened in my barn.'" The production ended up filming in Canada.

The film was originally titled In the Forest There Is Every Kind of Bird, but this was changed to Zoo in a reference to zoophilia.

Two brief clips of bestiality are shown in the film, although only one features audio. The first clip features Kenneth Pinyan receiving rear-entry position anal sex from a male horse. Another featured an unidentified man receiving rear-entry position anal sex from a male horse in a barn. Out of sync audio of the first clip is played over both in a loop. The audio is the moans, grunts and gasps of Kenneth, the lubricant sounds of the sex, the ejaculation and two unidentified men making brief comments, with one engaging in erotic talk. In the DVD audio commentary for the film, according to Devor and other zoos, Devor states that sex clip of Kenneth happened five years prior and was not the video that captured Kenneth sustaining fatal injuries.

== Reception ==
Sundance judges called the film a "humanizing look at the life and bizarre death of a seemingly normal Seattle family man who met his untimely end after an unusual encounter with a horse". The film was picked up for distribution by THINKFilm, whose executive said, "The film is extreme more in its formalism than in terms of graphic content."

The Seattle Times called the film "A tough sell that gets respect at Sundance", also noting the local economic effect of landmark films which put a location "on the map". Rob Nelson of the OC Weekly said, "Zoo achieves the seemingly impossible: It tells the luridly reported tale of a Pacific Northwest Boeing engineer's fatal sexual encounter with a horse in a way that's haunting rather than shocking and tender beyond reason." Dennis Lim of The New York Times commended how the film is able to tell its story "with neither squeamishness nor prurience." Similar views were expressed by Kenneth Turan of the Los Angeles Times, who said it was "remarkably, an elegant, eerily lyrical film", and Geoff Pevere of the Toronto Star, who said the film is "gorgeously artful ... one of the most beautifully restrained, formally distinctive and mysterious films of the entire festival". Anthony Kaufman of IndieWire called it "one of the most beautiful films of the year" and noted that "without sensation", it steps back to a "non-traditional" viewpoint, with "Devor [making] a persuasive, provocative and deeply profound case for tolerance and understanding in the face of the seemingly most incomprehensible of acts".

Other reviewers criticized the film for breaching "the last taboo", or for sinking to new depths, with Kathleen Parker of The Baltimore Sun writing, "More compelling than the depths of man's degeneracy is our cultural rationalization of 'art,' whereby pushing the envelope is confused with genius and scuttling the last taboo is seen as an expression of sophistication."

On the review aggregator website Rotten Tomatoes, the film has an approval rating of 60%, based on 50 reviews. The website's consensus reads, "While a marginally fascinating look at a taboo subject, Zoo is bogged down by its overly artistic presentation."

== Awards and recognition ==
Zoo was one of 16 documentaries selected, out of 856 submitted, for screening at the Sundance Film Festival, and played at numerous U.S. regional festivals thereafter.

It was selected as one of the top five American films to be presented at the Directors' Fortnight sidebar at the 2007 Cannes Film Festival.

== Aftermath ==
Charles Mudede reported in 2015 that the zoophiles featured in the film had remained in contact with the director; according to Mudede, they believed that Devor was "a real ally" to their cause.
