= Fremont Older =

American journalist (1856–1935)

- Portrait by Johan Hagemeyer, 1928
- Born: August 30, 1856; Appleton, Wisconsin, U.S.
- Died: March 3, 1935 (aged 78); Stockton, California, U.S.
- Occupation: Newspaper editor
- Spouse: Cora Miranda Baggerly (m. 1893)

Fremont Older (August 30, 1856 – March 3, 1935) was an American newspaperman and editor in San Francisco, California for nearly 50 years and an important activist in the progressive social and political life of the era and area. He is best known for his campaigns against political corruption, especially in the San Francisco graft trials, and for his efforts on behalf of Thomas Mooney and Warren Billings, who were wrongly convicted for the San Francisco Preparedness Day Bombing of 1916.

== Career ==
Older c. 1901

Born in a log house in Appleton, Wisconsin, Older began working as an apprentice printer at age of 12, inspired by the story of Horace Greeley. He worked in Virginia City, Nevada, on the Territorial Enterprise, then moved on to the Redwood City Journal, later writing for the Alta California.

The "Big Four" graft prosecutors (left to right): Francis J. Heney, William J. Burns, Fremont Older, and Rudolph Spreckels.

In 1895, Older became managing editor of the San Francisco Bulletin (later merged with The San Francisco Call in 1929). He gained notoriety when he took on the political machine of boss Abe Ruef in San Francisco, during the mayoralty of Eugene Schmitz. This led to the corruption trials during the rebuilding of San Francisco following the 1906 earthquake and fire. On September 27, 1907, Older was kidnapped and threatened with murder by private detective Luther Brown, said to be working for the grafters.

Older was an early defender of prostitutes as victims of their exploiters, both criminal and official, publishing a story at the Bulletin in 1917 entitled "A Voice from the Underworld, by Alice Smith." The article also increased the circulation of the Bulletin.

In his later years at the Bulletin, Older was offended by Robert Alexander Crothers, the owner of the paper, rewriting his editorials and refusal to commit to a lifelong appointment.

After 23 years of service at the Bulletin, Older resigned in 1918 and went to William Randolph Hearst's paper, the San Francisco Call. Along with talented staff, he brought to the public numerous stories that the Bulletin owner had refused to carry, including the James Graham Fair will case involving former state Supreme court justice Frederick W. Henshaw and a bribe amounting to $400,000, and the case of Thomas Mooney's and Warren Billings's wrongful conviction for the San Francisco Preparedness Day Bombing.

Older originally believed Mooney and Billings guilty, but changed his mind and spent 20 years working for their release. Although it was reported that Older disliked Mooney, thinking him worthy of jail for real crimes, he did not believe the bombing at Steuart and Market was one of them. For his efforts, Older was called a communist, a Wobbly, a syndicalist and traitor, but Hearst backed him. Older died a few years before Mooney was pardoned by California Governor Culbert Olson in 1939.

== Personal life ==
In 1893, Cora Miranda Baggerly, later a "noted Californian historian and writer," met Older while on summer vacation from Syracuse. She and her classmates had performed in a play in Sacramento, which Older happened to have attended. They quickly became engaged and were married a month later on August 22. The couple lived in various San Francisco hotels.

In 1912, the couple purchased some land and then two years later built Woodhills, a house of hybrid architectural features that Cora Older mostly directed herself. The property today is now a regional park known as the Fremont Older Open Space Preserve, and it has a "Cora Older Trail" available to the public. Throughout the 1910s and 1920s, she was associated with fellow activist and writer Stella Wynne Herron.

Older was also a long-time friend and correspondent of Clarence Darrow and was known as a friend to the poor. He regularly tried to reform drunkards and criminals, with mixed success. After 20 years of attempting to help such persons, Older said, "I'm sorry, but I must admit that of the scores I have helped, all but one or two have failed me."

Older died at a hospital in Stockton, California after suffering a heart attack while driving. He was buried at the Los Gatos Memorial Park, San Jose.

== Works ==
- Older, Fremont (1919). My Own Story. San Francisco: The Call Publishing Company – via sfgenealogy.org.
- Older, Fremont (1931). Growing Up. San Francisco Call-Bulletin – via hathitrust.org.

== Legacy ==
- The World War II Liberty ship, the S.S. Fremont Older, was named for Older.
- The Fremont Older Open Space Preserve incorporates his home and estate in the hills above Cupertino, California.
- The Fremont Older Elementary School, Cupertino, California was also named for Older.

== Resources ==
- Gaudy Century, the story of San Francisco's hundred years of robust journalism - John Bruce - Random House N.Y. 1948
- My Own Story - Fremont Older - The Call Publishing Co, San Francisco 1919 - Focuses on the San Francisco newspaper and political scene 1895–1917.
- Fremont Older & the 1916 San Francisco Bombing. A Tireless Crusade for Justice - John C. Ralston. The History Press, Charleston, S.C., 2013. About Older's crusade to free two men wrongly convicted of a terrorist bombing.
