= The Naked Proof =

- Directed by: Jamie Hook
- Starring: Michael Chick, Arlette Del Toro, August Wilson
- Distributed by: Pinwheel Pictures
- Release date: June 13, 2003
- Running time: 108 minutes
- Country: United States
- Language: English

The Naked Proof is a 2003 independent feature film that was directed by Jamie Hook. The film was released on June 6, 2003 through Pinwheel Pictures and follows the trials and tribulations of a philosophy student.

== Synopsis ==
The film follows Henry, a philosophy student under extreme amounts of stress over his PhD dissertation over the existence of other people. His life is made even more stressful and random when he comes across Miriam, a mysterious pregnant woman trying to get into his apartment. The two continue to cross paths and Henry must choose between writing his dissertation or following a woman who may or may not exist.

== Cast ==
- Michael Chick as Henry Rawitscher
- Arlette Del Toro as Miriam
- August Wilson as Narrator

== Film festival showings ==
- Seattle International Film Festival (2003)
- Minneapolis–Saint Paul International Film Festival (2004)
- Wisconsin Film Festival (2005)
- Northwest Film Forum (2005)

== Reception ==
Critical reception for the film was mostly positive, with Film Threat praising the movie's dialogue. The Stranger also praised The Naked Proof, saying that it was " full of spirited fits and starts". Variety gave an ambivalent review, writing that it was an "[a]miable, good-hearted pic could have used a little more brain and a lot less mouth to make the most of its ain't-humans-weird approach to romantic comedy".
