= Charles Willeford =

American writer

- Willeford in the 1980s
- Born: January 2, 1919; Little Rock, Arkansas, US
- Died: March 27, 1988 (aged 69); Miami, Florida, US
- Resting place: Arlington National Cemetery, Arlington, Virginia, US
- Occupations: Writer; college professor; magazine editor; boxer; actor; horse trainer; radio announcer; soldier; airman

Charles Ray Willeford III (January 2, 1919 – March 27, 1988) was an American writer. An author of fiction, poetry, autobiography and literary criticism, Willeford wrote a series of novels featuring hardboiled detective Hoke Moseley. Willeford published steadily from the 1940s on, but vaulted to wider attention with the first Hoke Moseley book, Miami Blues (1984), which is considered one of its era's most influential works of crime fiction. Film adaptations have been made of four of Willeford's novels: Cockfighter, Miami Blues, The Woman Chaser, and The Burnt Orange Heresy.

== Early life ==
Charles Ray Willeford III was born in Little Rock, Arkansas, on January 2, 1919. Following the death of his father from tuberculosis in 1922, Willeford and his mother moved to the Los Angeles area. After his mother's death in 1927, also from TB, he lived with his grandmother Mattie Lowey on Figueroa Street near Exposition Park until 1932. At the age of thirteen, in the midst of the Great Depression, he boarded a freight train in Los Angeles, assumed a false identity, and—passing as a seventeen-year-old—traveled by rail along the Mexican border for a year.

== Career ==
Dennis McMillan publicity photograph

In March 1935, Willeford signed up with the California National Guard, but a few months later applied for discharge so he could enlist in the regular United States Army. He spent two years in the Air Corps stationed in the Philippines serving as a fire truck driver, a gas truck driver, and briefly as a cook. At the end of 1938, he was discharged from the Army. Willeford re-enlisted in March 1939, again joining the Air Corps at March Field, California, but later transferring to the 11th Armored Cavalry Regiment stationed at the Presidio of Monterey. In the cavalry, he learned to ride and care for horses and spent several months learning the art of horseshoeing. He also served as a "horseholder" in a machine gun troop and earned a marksman qualification.

In 1942, Willeford married Lara Bell Fridley before being stationed at Fort Benning, Georgia, for infantry school. He was assigned to Company C, 11th Tank Battalion, 10th Armored Division and sent to Europe as a tank commander. He fought in the Battle of the Bulge and earned the Silver Star, the Bronze Star for outstanding bravery, the Purple Heart with one oak leaf cluster, and the Luxembourg War Cross. After V-E Day, he studied at Biarritz American University until he was shipped back to the United States.

Willeford enlisted again in 1945 for a term of three years. As a member of the 24th Infantry Division, he was stationed in Kyushu, Japan, from 1947 to 1949. He ran the army radio station WLKH and was promoted to master sergeant.

Proletarian Laughter, Willeford's first book of poetry, was published in 1948. In May 1949, he and his wife, Lara, divorced. In July of the same year, he left the army, leaving a mailing address of General Delivery, Dallas, Texas. Willeford enrolled in the Universitarias de Belles Artes in Lima, Peru, studying art and art history in the graduate program. He was dismissed from the university when officials learned that he had neither an undergraduate degree nor a high school diploma. He lived in New York City for a month at the end of 1949 before re-enlisting in the air force.

Willeford was stationed at Hamilton Air Force Base in California through April 1952. He married Mary Jo Norton in July of that year, and lived for a while in Birmingham, Alabama. In 1953, Willeford's first novel, High Priest of California, was published. Bound as a double volume with another writer's novel, it sold 55,000 copies, about a third of its print run. In January 1954, he re-enlisted once again; he was stationed this time at Palm Beach Air Force Base, while living in West Palm Beach, Florida. In 1955, he was reassigned to Ernest Harmon Air Force Base in Newfoundland, Canada. Willeford finally left active duty in November 1956. By that time, two more novels of his had been published.

== Later life ==
After retiring from the Air Force in 1956, Willeford held jobs as a professional boxer, actor, horse trainer, and radio announcer. He studied painting in France for a time, returning to the United States to attend Palm Beach Junior College. After receiving an associate degree in 1960, he studied English literature at the University of Miami, attaining a bachelor's degree in 1962 and a master's in 1964. During this period he also worked as an associate editor with Alfred Hitchcock's Mystery Magazine and began a long tenure as a book reviewer for the Miami Herald. Willeford had been very productive as a novelist after leaving the military, but after 1962's Cockfighter, he would not have another novel published for nine years. Upon receiving his M.A., Willeford taught humanities classes at the University of Miami through 1967, then moved to Miami-Dade Community College where he became an associate professor, teaching English and philosophy through 1985.

Charles Willeford as Ed Middleton in Cockfighter (1974)

In 1971, The Burnt Orange Heresy, often identified as Willeford's best noir novel, and The Hombre from Sonora appeared (the latter under a pseudonym). Though he would continue to write fiction, there would again be an extended hiatus—thirteen years—before another novel of his came out. He wrote the screenplay for the 1974 film adaptation of Cockfighter, in which he also acted. In 1976, he and his second wife were divorced. The following year he appeared in a small role in the film Thunder and Lightning, produced by Roger Corman. Willeford married his third wife, Betsy Poller, in 1981. Three years later came the publication of Miami Blues, the first of the Hoke Moseley novels and their twisted take on the hardboiled tradition for which Willeford would become best known. The manuscript had been rejected six times before St. Martin's Press agreed to publish it. The "series was almost nipped in the bud," notes Lawrence Block. In Willeford's first, unpublished, sequel, "he had his unlikely hero commit an unforgivable crime, and ended the book with Hoke contentedly anticipating a life of solitary confinement." As it turned out, the popularity of Miami Blues and its first two published sequels led to the largest financial windfall of the author's life: a $225,000 advance for the fourth Hoke Moseley book, The Way We Die Now. Released in early 1988, it would be his last novel.

== Death ==
Charles Willeford died of a heart attack on March 27, 1988, in Miami, Florida. He was interred at Arlington National Cemetery in Arlington County, Virginia.

== Literary style ==
Steve Erickson suggests that Willeford's crime novels are the "genre's equivalent of Philip K. Dick's best science fiction novels. They don't really fit into the genre." Marshall Jon Fisher describes the "true earmark" of Willeford's writing, particularly his early paperbacks, as "humor—a distinctively crotchety, sometimes raunchy, often genre-satirizing humor." "Quirky is the word that always comes to mind," according to crime novelist Lawrence Block. "Willeford wrote quirky books about quirky characters, and seems to have done so with a magnificent disregard for what anyone else thought." In Erickson's description, "The camera's not really focused on the middle of the scene. It's a little bit off. They're not plot driven or language driven, which makes them really different from most major crime novels. They're character driven and cunning in a very eccentric way." Lou Stathis argues that it is Willeford's "complete lack of sentimentality and melodrama that sets him apart from the pack of so-called 'tough-guy' writers.... Willeford's prose is as flat-toned and evenly cadenced—as emotionally neutral—as the blank visages of his feigned-human socio/psychopaths...the careful accretion of detail adding up to an incontrovertible truth of insight."

Pick-Up (1955), Willeford's second published novel and the first to appear without being packaged with another author's work

Woody Haut suggests that Willeford's second novel, Pick-Up (1955), "combines David Goodis's romanticism, Horace McCoy's portrayal of alienated outcasts and Charles Jackson's depiction of life as a 'lost weekend.'" The Woman Chaser (1960), he writes, features a "structural self-consciousness [that] prefigures subsequent post-modernist texts." Lee Horsley describes how Willeford—along with his contemporaries Jim Thompson and Charles Williams—"structured entire narratives around the satiric presentation of the male point of view...subverting male stereotypes and creating a space within which the strong, independent woman could get and even sometimes keep the upper hand." David Cochran suggests that while his protagonists are not quite as psychotic as Thompson's, "they are in some ways even more disturbing because of their appearance of normality." Most, he points out, "have adjusted successfully to postwar American society, which given the[ir] psychotic nature...serves as a damning indictment of the dominant culture."

Willeford's wide-ranging interests were reflected in his work: High Priest of California references T. S. Eliot, James Joyce's Ulysses, and composer Béla Bartók. The Burnt Orange Heresy cracks jokes about Samuel Beckett amidst contemplations of the sources of Dada and Surrealist painting. In Block's words, "it is at once a solid crime novel and a fierce send-up of modern art while constituting perhaps the longest shaggy dog story ever told." Willeford sometimes addressed more serious topics in explicit fashion: The Black Mass of Brother Springer (1958) is one of the first novels to depict the civil rights revolution that followed the Supreme Court's ruling in Brown v. Board of Education. But even without such overt topicality, there was an ideological edge to his work. Cochran writes of the author's 1950s and 1960s novels,

Willeford created a world in which the predatory cannibalism of American capitalism provides the model for all human relations, in which the American success ethic mercilessly casts aside all who are unable or unwilling to compete, and in which the innate human appreciation of artistic beauty is cruelly distorted by the exigencies of mass culture.

In Haut's words, Willeford "creates characters who search for autonomy but settle for survival.... [He] never abandons his class perspective." Describing the Hoke Moseley novels, Horsley similarly writes that Willeford "uses both his transgressors and his investigator...as commentators on the injustices of class and on a system that seems preoccupied with owning and controlling human life." According to Willeford's wife, Betsy, he had a credo that also served as a caution for aspiring writers: "Just tell the truth, and they'll accuse you of writing black humor."

== Notability and influence ==
"Nobody writes a better crime novel," Elmore Leonard said of Willeford. Sean McCann credits Willeford—along with Jim Thompson and David Goodis—as one of the writers responsible for bringing the "hard-boiled crime story to a new stage in its development during the 'paperback revolution' of the 50s." Centered around criminal protagonists rather than private eyes and "focused on those features of the genre that seemed most grotesque or cruel or uncanny and, extending them to new extremes, [they] remade the hard-boiled story into a drama of psychopathology." According to bookseller Mitch Kaplan, an expert on the South Florida literary scene, "Miami Blues launched the modern era of Miami crime fiction. There's a direct line from [Willeford] through just about everyone writing crime fiction in Miami today." Fellow writer James Lee Burke has acknowledged a "great debt" to Willeford: "If someone wanted advice about writing, about how to pull it off, make it work, punch it up ... Charles could tell you how to do it." Daniel Woodrell is among the other crime novelists he is identified as influencing. Willeford's characteristic juxtaposition of humor and violence was apparently one of director Quentin Tarantino's inspirations. Discussing Pulp Fiction, Tarantino has said that the film "is not noir. I don't do neo-noir. I see Pulp Fiction as closer to modern-day crime fiction, a little closer to Charles Willeford." Writing in 2004, Jonathan Yardley of The Washington Post called him "one of our most skilled, interesting, accomplished and productive writers of what the literary establishment insists on pigeonholing as 'genre' fiction."

Four of Willeford's books have been adapted for the screen: Cockfighter (1974; starring Warren Oates and directed by Monte Hellman), for which Willeford wrote the screenplay; Miami Blues (1990; starring Alec Baldwin and directed by George Armitage, also featuring Fred Ward as Hoke Mosley); The Woman Chaser (1999; starring Patrick Warburton and directed by Robinson Devor); and The Burnt Orange Heresy (2019; starring Claes Bang and directed by Giuseppe Capotondi).

Willeford adapted his first novel, High Priest of California, into a play. A 1988 production in New York City by the Vortex Theater Company apparently represents its first full staging. A subsequent production was staged in 2003.

== Works ==
The bibliography below lists all original publications of Willeford's works and selected reprints that contain variant Willeford titles and/or texts or significant ancillary material.

=== Hoke Moseley series ===
Reprint edition of the first Hoke Moseley novel, Miami Blues (1984), Willeford's best known work

There were four books in the Hoke Moseley series, plus an unpublished manuscript.

- Willeford, Charles (1984). Miami Blues. New York: St. Martin's Press. Willeford's original title was Kiss Your Ass Good-Bye. A 2004 Vintage Crime/Black Lizard trade paperback reprint included an introduction by Elmore Leonard. Made into a 1990 American black comedy crime film directed by George Armitage.
- Willeford, Charles (1985). New Hope for the Dead. New York: St. Martin's Press. A 2004 Vintage Crime/Black Lizard trade paperback reprint included an introduction by James Lee Burke.
- Willeford, Charles (1987). Sideswipe. New York: St. Martin's Press.. A 2005 Vintage Crime/Black Lizard trade paperback reprint included an introduction by Lawrence Block.
- Willeford, Charles (1988). The Way We Die Now. New York: Random House.. A 2005 Vintage Crime/Black Lizard trade paperback reprint included an introduction by Donald E. Westlake.

The unpublished manuscript is Grimhaven. There is a photocopy of typescript maintained in the Charles Willeford Archive at the Broward County Library, Florida (212 leaves, no date, with "NOTE: as per Betsy Willeford [widow of the author]: 'Ms. of the "black Hoke Mosely" [sic], never published, sold to a small but ruthless group of collectors in the form of Xerox copies. May not be copied in the library by patrons who'll wholesale it on the Internet.'") It was originally intended as the second Hoke Moseley novel.

=== Other novels ===
- High Priest of California/[Full Moon]. New York: Royal Books, 1953. Paperback original. Willeford's first published novel, bound with novel by Talbot Mundy. Cover blurbs for High Priest: "A roaring saga of the male animal on the prowl"/"The world was his oyster—and women his pearls!" 151,000-copy press run.
- Pick-Up. New York: Beacon Books, 1955. Paperback original. His second published novel. Willeford's original title was Until I Am Dead. Cover blurb: "He holed up with a helpless lush." Crime Novels, American Noir of the 1950s. New York: The Library of America, 1997, contains Pick-Up.
- High Priest of California/Wild Wives. New York: Beacon Books, 1956. Paperback original. Willeford would later mistakenly recall that Until I Am Dead was the original title for Wild Wives. Bound with his earlier novel, High Priest, which is blessed with another turgid blurb: "No woman could resist his strange cult of lechery!"

High Priest of California/Wild Wives. San Francisco: RE/Search Publications, 1987. Trade paperback reprint. Includes an introduction by Lou Stathis, an afterword by V. Vale and Andrea Juno, biographical notes, and a bibliography. Also included is Willeford's own adaptation of Priest into playform.

- Honey Gal. New York: Beacon Books, 1958. Paperback original. Willeford's original title was The Black Mass of Brother Springer. The publisher rejected it and asked for another; Willeford proposed Nigger Lover, which was also rejected. The cover blurbs indicate Beacon's high intentions: "He was white, she was beautiful—and bad"/"A starkly naked novel of sin and segregation."

The Black Mass of Brother Springer. Berkeley, California: Black Lizard Books, 1989. Paperback reprint, with Willeford's title restored.
The Black Mass of Brother Springer. New Albany, Indiana: Wit's End Publishing, 2004. Trade paperback reprint, with Willeford's title restored. Includes a foreword by James Sallis.

- Lust Is a Woman. New York: Beacon Books, 1958. Paperback original. Willeford's original title was Made in Miami. Cover blurbs: "She was a pawn in an evil game"/"The story of Maria who wanted—desperately—to become a movie star!"

Made In Miami. Point Blank, 2008. Trade paperback reprint, with Willeford's title restored.

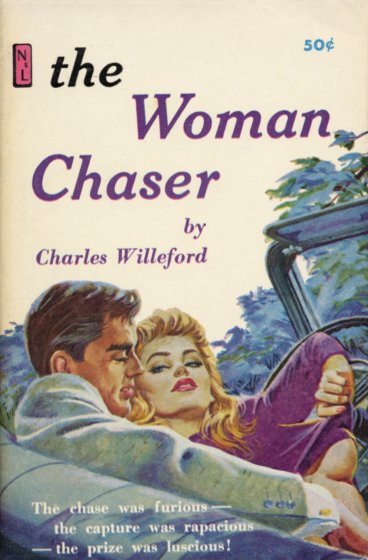
"He could never again scale the heights reached by the epic Lumpy Grits." Cover of The Woman Chaser (1960)

- The Woman Chaser. Chicago: Newsstand Library, 1960. Paperback original. Willeford's original title was The Director. The title of the protagonist's would-be cinematic magnum opus is The Man Who Got Away.
- The Whip Hand. Greenwich, Connecticut: Fawcett Publications, 1961 Paperback original. Published under the sole byline of W. Franklin Sanders, though documentary evidence and stylistic analysis indicate it is largely, perhaps almost completely, the work of Willeford. A manuscript of the novel, written around 1952, found in his files indicates that Willeford's original title was Deliver Me from Dallas!

Deliver Me from Dallas! Tucson, Arizona: Dennis McMillan Publications, 2001. Hardcover of Willeford's original manuscript version, with his name and title restored. Includes an introduction by Jesse Sublett.

- Understudy for Love. Chicago: Newsstand Library, 1961. Paperback original. Willeford's original title was The Understudy: A Novel of Men and Women. Cover blurb: "When it came to love he was just an understudy...but he was learning in a hurry!" Newsstand's covers advised that both this and Willeford's next novel were "Adult Reading."

Understudy for Death. London: Titan Books, 2018. First Hard Case Crime edition, July 2018. Cover blurb: "First publication in nearly 60 years!"

- No Experience Necessary. Chicago: Newsstand Library, 1962. Paperback original. Willeford's original title was Nothing Under the Sun. Cover blurb: 'You like it?' she whispered. 'I like it,' he clenched his teeth, 'I like it, I like it!'" The in-house editor rewrote parts of this novel in a more conventional "pulp erotica" style without Willeford's advance knowledge or subsequent approval. Willeford disclaimed this book. He salvaged the work later by using it, with only slight rewriting, as the Pop Sinkiewicz half of Sideswipe.
- Cockfighter. Chicago: Chicago Paperback House, 1962. Paperback original. Cover blurb: "The dedicated obsession of a fanatical sport. As in the bullring—to the death. Legal in Florida—illegal in the forty-nine other states. The iron will of a man, whose entire life was channeled into one supreme ambition!"

Cockfighter. New York: Crown Publishers, 1972. Hardcover. A slightly rewritten second edition of the novel.

- The Burnt Orange Heresy. New York: Crown Publishers, 1971. Willeford's first hardcover original.
- The Hombre from Sonora. New York: Lenox Hill Press, 1971. His second hardcover original. Published under the pseudonym "Will Charles." Willeford's original title was The Difference.

The Difference. Tucson, Arizona: Dennis McMillan Publications, 1999. Hardcover reprint, with Willeford's original title restored.

- Kiss Your Ass Good-Bye. Miami Beach, Florida: Dennis McMillan Publications, 1987. Hardcover. A self-contained fragment from Willeford's novel The Shark-Infested Custard, finished by early 1975, but rejected by everyone who saw it as "too depressing" to publish. Four hundred–copy press run.
- A Charles Willeford Omnibus. London: MacDonald and Co, 1991. Hardcover. Collects Pick-Up, The Burnt Orange Heresy, and Cockfighter.
- The Shark-Infested Custard. Novato, California: Underwood-Miller Books, 1993. Hardcover. The novel deemed "too depressing" to publish when offered around in the mid-seventies, in print at last. As an in-joke, the novel's four protagonists discuss Monte Hellman's Two-Lane Blacktop and its star, Warren Oates, in the first chapter. Oates collaborated with Hellman on the film adaptation of Cockfighter.

The Shark-Infested Custard. New York: Dell, 1996. Paperback reprint. Includes an introduction by Lawrence Block.

=== Poetry ===
- The Outcast Poets. Yonkers, New York: Alicat Bookshop Press, 1947. No. 8 in the Alicat Bookshop Press "Outcast" chapbook series. Collects poems by Willeford and four other writers.
- Proletarian Laughter. Yonkers, New York: Alicat Bookshop Press, 1948. No. 12 in the "Outcast" chapbook series. Contains a preface by the author and seven prose "Schematics" interlaced with the poems. One thousand–copy press run.
- Poontang and Other Poems. Crescent City, Florida: New Athenaeum Press, 1967. Self-published saddle-stapled chapbook of poetry. Five hundred–copy press run.

=== Short stories and nonfiction ===
- The Machine in Ward Eleven. New York: Belmont Books, 1963. Paperback original. Short story collection. Willeford stated, "I had a hunch that madness was a predominant theme and a normal condition for Americans living in the second half of this century. The publication of The Machine in Ward Eleven (1963) and its reception by readers confirmed what I had only heretofore suspected."
- A Guide for the Undehemorrhoided. Kendall, Florida: self-published, 1977. Hardcover. A short account of Willeford's hemorrhoid operation. One thousand–copy press run.
- Off the Wall. Montclair, New Jersey: Pegasus Rex Press, 1980. Hardcover. Nonfiction. An account of the Son of Sam case, telling the story of Craig Glassman, the deputy sheriff who captured David Berkowitz.

"Those are eating dogs.... Did you ever eat any dog?" Cover of Something About a Soldier (1986)

- Something About a Soldier. New York: Random House, 1986. Hardcover. Autobiography, covering Willeford's first hitches in the peacetime Army and Air Force in the Philippines and California, from age sixteen to age twenty.
- New Forms of Ugly: The Immobilized Hero in Modern Fiction. Miami Beach, Florida: Dennis McMillan Publications, 1987. Hardcover. (Willeford's New York Times obituary incorrectly gives it as The Immobilized Man in Modern Literature.) A revised version of The Immobilized Man: A New Hero In Modern Fiction, Willeford's University of Miami master's thesis. A survey of the literature of angst, covering writers from Fyodor Dostoevsky, through Franz Kafka and Samuel Beckett, to Chester Himes and Saul Bellow. 350-copy press run.
- Everybody's Metamorphosis. Missoula, Montana: Dennis McMillan Publications, 1988. Hardcover and limited-edition goatskin. Collection of short stories and essays. Includes annotated bibliography by Don Herron. 374-copy hardcover and 26-copy goatskin press run.
- I Was Looking for a Street. Woodstock, Vermont: Countryman Press, 1988. Hardcover. Autobiography, covering Willeford's childhood and the period when he went on the road as a teenager during the Depression, before joining the army.
- Collected Memoirs of Charles Willeford. Sarasota, Florida: Disc-Us Books, 1988. Paperback. Collects Something About a Soldier and I Was Looking for a Street.
- Cockfighter Journal: The Story of a Shooting. Santa Barbara, California: Neville Publishing, 1989. Hardcover. Autobiography, covering the filming of the Roger Corman production of Cockfighter (for which Willeford both wrote the screenplay and acted the role of Ed Middleton), taken from a diary he kept during the shoot.
- Writing and Other Blood Sports. Tucson, Arizona: Dennis McMillan Publications, 2000. Hardcover. Collection of essays on writing, writers, and related facts of life. Includes New Forms of Ugly. One thousand–copy press run.
- The Second Half of the Double Feature. New Albany, Indiana: Wit's End Publishing, 2003. Hardcover and trade paperback. Collection of short stories, vignettes, and autobiographical sketches. The hardcover also includes Willeford's complete poetry.

A full bibliography can be found in Don Herron's biography Willeford (1997).

== See also ==
- List of people from Little Rock, Arkansas
