= Police Beat =

- Directed by: Robinson Devor
- Written by: Charles Mudede; Robinson Devor
- Produced by: Jeffrey Brown; Alexis Ferris; Barnaby Dorfman
- Starring: Pape Sidy Niang; Eric Breedlove; Sarah Harlett; Anna Oxygen
- Cinematography: Sean Kirby
- Edited by: Mark Winitsky; Joe Shapiro
- Distributed by: Northwest Film Forum
- Release date: 2005
- Running time: 90 minutes
- Country: United States
- Languages: English; Wolof

Police Beat is a 2005 American crime film directed by Robinson Devor and written by Devor and Charles Mudede It follows the life of an African-born Seattle bicycle officer simply known as "Z" for a week. While Z goes about on his policing duties, he finds himself mentally preoccupied with his girlfriend who has gone on a camping trip with an old male friend. This obsession with the absence of his girlfriend and the escalating jealousy and paranoia makes him unfazed by the crimes he witnesses, which take place in locations all over Seattle (including the Arboretum, Gasworks Park in Wallingford, and the Boeing factory in Renton) on different levels of depravity.

The story is narrated by Z in his native Wolof language (the language of Senegal and parts of Mali, the Gambia, Côte d'Ivoire, and Mauritania), though he makes the transition to English when interacting with those around him. Police Beat provides an interesting glimpse into the life of a new immigrant to the United States that focuses less on the protagonist's experience as a new citizen and more on his response to life in an American city. His observation of both human vice and social outlook is contrasted with his conservative sense of duty, both to his work as a police officer and his relationship with his girlfriend.

Based on real police reports that appeared in Charles Mudede's column "Police Beat" for the weekly The Stranger, the film also provides a snapshot of Seattle in the early 21st century.
