= Fremont Older Open Space Preserve =

- Woodhills
- U.S. National Register of Historic Places
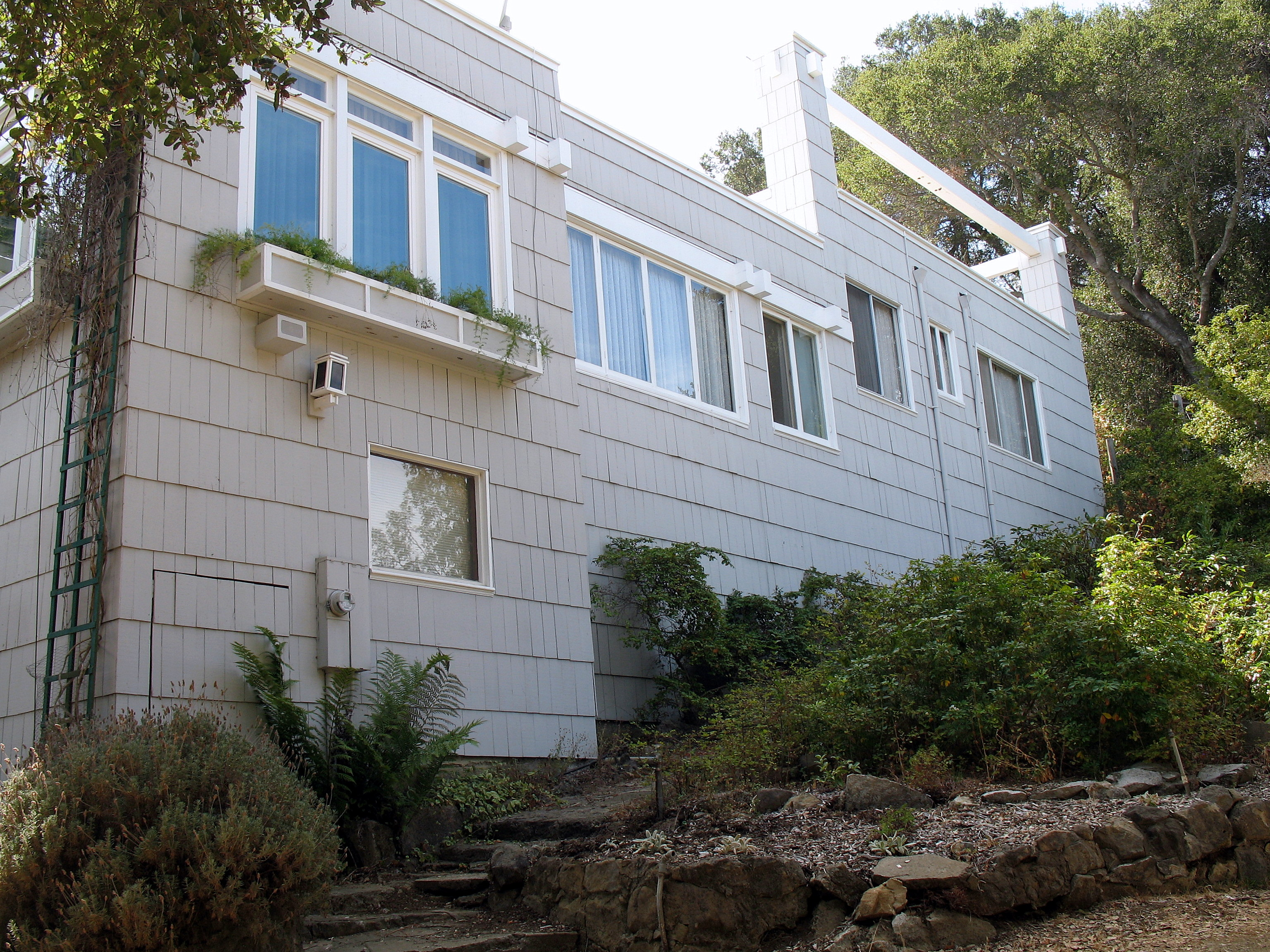

- Location within San Jose, California
- Nearest city: Cupertino, California
- Coordinates: 37°17′12″N 122°03′35″W
- Area: 3.7 acres (1.5 ha)
- Built: 1913
- Architect: Frank Delos Wolfe; McCall, Charles W.
- Architectural style: Modern Movement, Bay Area shingle style
- NRHP reference No.: 78000773
- Added to NRHP: December 20, 1978

Fremont Older Open Space Preserve is a 739-acre (299 ha) regional park located in Santa Clara County, California and operated by the Midpeninsula Regional Open Space District. The preserve contains 14.7 miles (23.7 km) of hiking trails, nearly all open to equestrians and bicycles. The area has been owned by the district since 1975.

The preserve is named after San Francisco newspaper editor Fremont Older, a previous owner. Older and his wife, Cora, purchased the then-200-acre (81 ha) property for $10,000 in 1912. They built a house there in 1914, where the Olders lived until their deaths, Fremont in 1935 and Cora in 1968. The house, known as Woodhills, has an unusual architectural style which incorporates both the shingle style and the then-developing modern movement.

The house was condemned at the time the district purchased the property, and was to be demolished. However, in 1979, newspaper publisher Mort Levine lobbied the district to save the house. The district agreed to lease it to Levine for 25 years at $1 per year. Levine and his wife spent $350,000 and the next 12 years renovating the house, which is now listed on the National Register of Historic Places. It is now their private residence, but is open to docent-led tours each spring.

Notable locations in the park include Hunter's Point, a 900 ft. (275 m) bald hilltop which is locally known for its sweeping views of the south Bay Area as well as Maisie's Peak (the highest point in the preserve) and Garrod Farms.

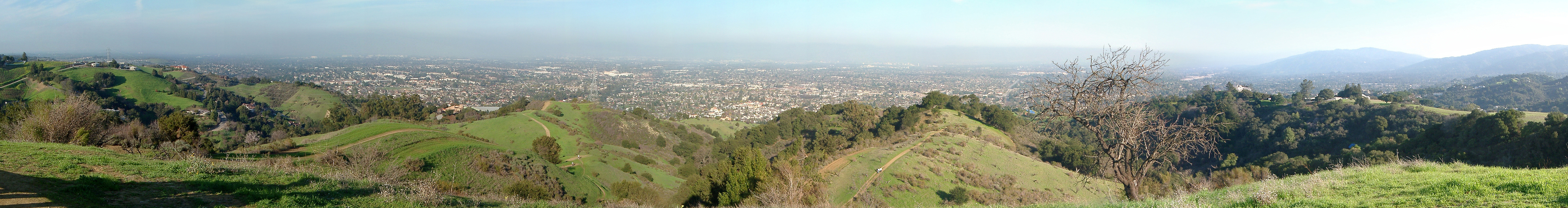
Panoramic view from Hunter's Point

The preserve contains many miles of trails and connects with other nearby locations, such as Stevens Creek County Park and Montebello Open Space Preserve.
