= 2024 New York Film Festival =

62nd edition

- Official festival poster by David Byrne
- Opening film: Nickel Boys
- Closing film: Blitz
- Location: New York City, United States
- Founded: 1963
- Founded by: Richard Roud and Amos Vogel
- Hosted by: Film at Lincoln Center
- Artistic director: Dennis Lim
- Festival date: September 27 – October 14, 2024
- Website: https://www.filmlinc.org/nyff2024/

New York Film Festival
- 2025 2023

The 62nd New York Film Festival took place September 27 to October 14, 2024, presented by Film at Lincoln Center.

RaMell Ross' historical drama film Nickel Boys was the opening film. Pedro Almodóvar's The Room Next Door was the festival's centerpiece. Steve McQueen's Blitz was the closing film.

Appearing in the NYFF's "Main Slate" for the first time were Payal Kapadia, Roberto Minervini, Carson Lund, Neo Sora, Julia Loktev, Basel Adra, Hamdan Ballal, Yuval Abraham, Rachel Szor, Rungano Nyoni, Nelson Carlo De Los Santos Arias, Mohammad Rasoulof, Yeo Siew Hua, Robinson Devor, Pia Marais and Minh Quý Trương.

World premieres included Julia Loktev's My Undesirable Friends: Part I — Last Air in Moscow and Robinson Devor's Suburban Fury.

== Official selections ==
=== Main slate ===
The following films were selected to the "Main Slate" section of the Festival:

| English title | Original title | Director(s) | Production country |
|---|---|---|---|
| All We Imagine as Light | പ്രഭയായ് നിനച്ചതെല്ലം | Payal Kapadia | India, France, Italy, Luxembourg, Netherlands |
| Anora | | Sean Baker | United States |
| April | აპრილი | Dea Kulumbegashvili | Georgia, France, Italy |
| Blitz (closing film) | | Steve McQueen | United Kingdom, United States |
| The Brutalist | | Brady Corbet | United States, United Kingdom, Hungary |
| By the Stream | 수유천 | Hong Sang-soo | South Korea |
| Caught by the Tides | 风流一代 | Jia Zhangke | China |
| Dahomey | | Mati Diop | Benin, France, Senegal |
| The Damned | Les Damnés | Roberto Minervini | Belgium, Italy, United States |
| Eephus | | Carson Lund | United States |
| Grand Tour | | Miguel Gomes | Portugal, France, Italy |
| Happyend | | Neo Sora | Japan, United States |
| Hard Truths | | Mike Leigh | United Kingdom, Spain |
| Harvest | | Athina Rachel Tsangari | United Kingdom, Germany, Greece, France, United States |
| Misericordia | Miséricorde | Alain Guiraudie | France, Portugal, Spain |
| My Undesirable Friends: Part I — Last Air in Moscow | | Julia Loktev | United States |
| Nickel Boys (opening film) | | RaMell Ross | United States |
| No Other Land | لا أرض أخرى | Basel Adra, Hamdan Ballal, Yuval Abraham and Rachel Szor | Palestine, Norway |
| Oh, Canada | | Paul Schrader | United States |
| On Becoming a Guinea Fowl | | Rungano Nyoni | Ireland, United Kingdom, United States, Zambia |
| Pepe | | Nelson Carlo De Los Santos Arias | Dominican Republic, Namibia, Germany, France |
| The Room Next Door (centerpiece) | La habitación de al lado | Pedro Almodóvar | Spain |
| The Seed of the Sacred Fig | دانه انجیر مقدس | Mohammad Rasoulof | Iran, Germany, France |
| The Shrouds | | David Cronenberg | France, Canada |
| Stranger Eyes | 默视录 | Yeo Siew Hua | Singapore, Taiwan, France, United States |
| Suburban Fury | | Robinson Devor | United States |
| Transamazonia | | Pia Marais | France, Germany, Switzerland, Taiwan, Brazil |
| A Traveler's Needs | 여행자의 필요 | Hong Sang-soo | South Korea |
| Viet and Nam | Trong lòng đất | Minh Quý Trương | Vietnam, Philippines, Singapore, France, Netherlands |
| Who by Fire | Comme le feu | Philippe Lesage | Canada, France |
| Youth (Hard Times) | 青春（苦） | Wang Bing | France, Luxembourg, Netherlands |
| Youth (Homecoming) | 青春（归） | Wang Bing | France, Luxembourg, Netherlands |

=== Spotlight ===
Film at Lincoln Center announced Queer as the first film of the "Spotlight" section on August 08, 2024. The entire line-up was announced on August 14, 2024:

| English title | Original title | Director(s) | Production country |
|---|---|---|---|
| Afternoons of Solitude | Tardes de soledad | Albert Serra | Spain |
| Apocalypse in the Tropics | Apocalipse nos Trópicos | Petra Costa | Brazil, United States, Denmark |
| Elton John: Never Too Late | | R.J. Cutler and David Furnish | United States, United Kingdom |
| Emilia Pérez | | Jacques Audiard | France |
| The Friend | | Scott McGehee and David Siegel | United States |
| I’m Still Here | Ainda Estou Aqui | Walter Salles | Brazil, France |
| It's Not Me | C'est Pas Moi | Leos Carax | France |
| Maria | | Pablo Larraín | Italy, Germany |
| Pavements | | Alex Ross Perry | United States |
| Queer | | Luca Guadagnino | Italy, United States |
| A Real Pain | | Jesse Eisenberg | United States, Poland |
| Rumours | | Guy Maddin, Evan Johnson and Galen Johnson | Canada, Germany |
| Exposé du Film Annonce du Film "Scénario" (short) | | Jean-Luc Godard | France, Japan |
| Scénarios (short) | | Jean-Luc Godard | France, Japan |
| TWST / Things We Said Today | | Andrei Ujică | France, Romania |
| Union | | Brett Story and Stephen Maing | United States |

=== Currents ===
Film at Lincoln Center announced Little, Big, and Far as the Currents section "Centerpiece" on August 15, 2024, alongside the announcement of the entire line-up:

| English title | Original title | Director(s) | Production country |
|---|---|---|---|
| 7 Walks with Mark Brown | Sept promenades avec Mark Brown | Pierre Creton and Vincent Barré | France |
| The Ballad of Suzanne Césaire | | Madeleine Hunt-Ehrlich | United States |
| bluish | | Lilith Kraxner and Milena Czernovsky | Austria |
| Direct Action | | Guillaume Cailleau and Ben Russell | Germany, France |
| exergue – on documenta 14 | | Dimitris Athiridis | Greece |
| Fire of Wind | | Marta Mateus | Portugal, Switzerland, France |
| Jimmy | | Yashaddai Owens | France, Turkey |
| Lázaro at Night | Lázaro de noche | Nicolás Pereda | Canada, Mexico |
| Little, Big, and Far (currents centerpiece) | | Jem Cohen | Austria, United States |
| The Suit | | Heinz Emigholz | Germany, Mexico, Argentina, United States |
| Universal Language | آواز بوقلمون | Matthew Rankin | Canada |
| You Burn Me | Tú me abrasas | Matías Piñeiro | Argentina, Spain |

==== Currents shorts ====
| English title | Original title | Director(s) | Production country |
Program 1: The Will to Change
| An All-Around Feel Good | | Jordan Lord | United States |
| Black Glass | | Adam Piron | United States |
| The Deep West Assembly | | Cauleen Smith | United States |
| Man number 4 | | Miranda Pennell | United Kingdom |
Program 2: Identification Marks
| Being John Smith | | John Smith | United Kingdom |
| Efforts of Nature | | Morgan Quaintance | United Kingdom |
| I Remember (depth of flatten cruelty) | | James Richards and Tolia Astakhishvili | Germany |
| Track_ing | | Chanyeol Lee, Hanna Cho, Samgar Rakym and Ali Tynybekov | South Korea, Kazakhstan |
Program 3: Signal to Noise
| Grandmamauntsistercat | | Zuza Banasińska | Netherlands, Poland |
| Hemel | | Danielle Dean | United States, United Kingdom |
| Jizai | | Maiko Endo | Japan |
| Like an Outburst | | Sebastián Schjaer | Argentina |
Program 4: Space Is the Place
| A Black Screen Too | | Rhayne Vermette | Canada |
| Archipelago of Earthen Bones — To Bunya | | Malena Szlam | Australia, Canada |
| ESP | | Laura Kraning | United States |
| The Land at Night | | Richard Tuohy and Dianna Barrie | Australia |
| re-engraved | | Lei Lei | United States |
| Revolving Rounds | | Christina Jauernik and Johann Lurf | Austria |
Program 5: Material Worlds
| The Invisible Worm | | Rosalind Nashashibi | United Kingdom |
| No Spank | | Jordan Strafer | Greece |
| Sinking Feeling | | Zachary Epcar | United States |
| Towards the Sun, Far from the Center | | Pascal Viveros and Luciana Merino | Chile |
| Vibrant Matter | | Pablo Marín | Argentina, Spain |
Program 6: Poetry Is Not a Luxury
| Machine Boys | | Karimah Ashadu | Nigeria, Germany, Italy |
| October Noon | | Francisco Rodríguez Teare | Chile, France |
| Practice, Practice, Practice | | Kevin Jerome Everson | United States |
| Razeh-del | | Maryam Tafakory | Iran, United Kingdom, Italy |
| Refuse Room | | Simon Liu | Hong Kong, United States |

=== Revivals ===
| English title | Original title | Director(s) | Production country |
|---|---|---|---|
| Bona (1980) | | Lino Brocka | Philippines |
| Camp de Thiaroye (1988) | | Ousmane Sembène and Thierno Faty Sow | Senegal, Algeria, Tunisia |
| Compensation (1999) | | Zeinabu irene Davis | United States |
| The Fall of Otrar (1991) | Отырардың күйреуі | Ardak Amirkulov | Soviet Union |
| Four Nights of a Dreamer (1971) | Quatre nuits d'un rêveur | Robert Bresson | France |
| Hellraiser (1987) | | Clive Barker | United Kingdom |
| J’ai faim, j’ai froid (1984) | | Chantal Akerman | France |
| La Musica (1967) | | Marguerite Duras and Paul Seban | France |
| Model (1981) | | Frederick Wiseman | United States |
| Nightshift (1981) | | Robina Rose | United Kingdom |
| Northern Lights (1978) | | John Hanson and Rob Nilsson | United States |
| Reporters (1981) | | Raymond Depardon | France |
| The Sealed Soil (1977) | خاک سر به مهر | Marva Nabili | Iran |
