= List of submissions to the 65th Academy Awards for Best Foreign Language Film =

1992 Best Foreign Language Film submissions
- Régis Wargnier directed Indochina, which won the year's award.

Highlights
- Oscar winner: (France) Indochina
- Submissions: 33
- Debuts: 6
- Total eligible: 32

This is a list of submissions to the 65th Academy Awards for the Best Foreign Language Film. The Academy of Motion Picture Arts and Sciences (AMPAS) has invited the film industries of various countries to submit their best film for the Academy Award for Best Foreign Language Film every year since the award was created in 1956. The award is presented annually by the Academy to a feature-length motion picture produced outside the United States that contains primarily non-English dialogue. The Foreign Language Film Award Committee oversees the process and reviews all the submitted films.

For the 65th Academy Awards, the submitted motion pictures must have first been released theatrically in their respective countries between 1 November 1991 and 31 October 1992. The deadline for submissions to the Academy was 2 November 1992. 33 countries submitted films and were found to be eligible by AMPAS and screened for voters. Croatia, Estonia, Kazakhstan, Latvia, Russia, and Uruguay submitted films for the first time. Uruguay was later disqualified by the Academy after the nominations were announced, leaving 32 eligible entries. The five nominees were announced on 17 February 1993.

France won the award for the twelfth time for Indochina by Régis Wargnier, which was also nominated for Best Actress (Catherine Deneuve).

== Submissions ==
Submitting country	Film title used in nomination	Original title	Language(s)	Director(s)	Result
Argentina	The Dark Side of the Heart	El lado oscuro del corazón	Spanish, German	Eliseo Subiela	Not nominated
Austria	Benny's Video		German, Arabic, French, English	Michael Haneke	Not nominated
Belgium	Daens		Flemish, Dutch, French, Latin, Spanish, Italian	Stijn Coninx	Nominated
Canada	Léolo		French, Italian	Jean-Claude Lauzon	Not nominated
China	The Story of Qiu Ju	秋菊打官司	Lanyin Mandarin	Zhang Yimou	Not nominated
Croatia	Story from Croatia	Priča iz Hrvatske	Croatian	Krsto Papić	Not nominated
Cuba	Adorable Lies	Adorables mentiras	Spanish	Gerardo Chijona	Not nominated
Denmark	Sofie		Danish	Liv Ullmann	Not nominated
Estonia	Those Old Love Letters	Need vanad armastuskirjad	Estonian	Mati Põldre	Not nominated
France	Indochina	Indochine	French, Vietnamese	Régis Wargnier	Won Academy Award
Germany	Schtonk!		German	Helmut Dietl	Nominated
Hungary	Sweet Emma, Dear Böbe	Édes Emma, drága Böbe - vázlatok, aktok	Hungarian, German, Russian, English	István Szabó	Not nominated
Iceland	As in Heaven	Svo á jörðu sem á himni	Icelandic, French	Kristín Jóhannesdóttir	Not nominated
India	Thevar Magan	தேவர் மகன்	Madurai Tamil	Bharathan	Not nominated
Indonesia	Mer's Lips	Bibir Mer	Indonesian	Arifin C. Noer	Not nominated
Israel	Life According to Agfa	החיים על פי אגפה	Hebrew	Assi Dayan	Not nominated
Italy	The Stolen Children	Il ladro di bambini	Italian	Gianni Amelio	Not nominated
Japan	The Oil-Hell Murder	女殺油地獄	Japanese	Hideo Gosha	Not nominated
Kazakhstan	The Fall of Otrar	Гибел Отрара	Kazakh, Mandarin, Mongolian	Ardak Amirkulov	Not nominated
Latvia	The Child of Man	Cilvēka bērns	Latgalian	Jānis Streičs	Not nominated
Mexico	Like Water for Chocolate	Como agua para chocolate	Spanish, English	Alfonso Arau	Not nominated
Netherlands	The Northerners	De noorderlingen	Dutch	Alex van Warmerdam	Not nominated
Norway	The Warrior's Heart	Krigerens hjerte	Norwegian, Finnish, German, English	Leidulv Risan	Not nominated
Poland	All That Really Matters	Wszystko, co najważniejsze	Polish, Russian	Robert Gliński	Not nominated
Portugal	Day of Despair	O Dia do Desespero	Portuguese	Manoel de Oliveira	Not nominated
Romania	Luxury Hotel	Hotel de lux	Romanian	Dan Pița	Not nominated
Russia	Close to Eden	Урга	Mongolian, Russian, Mandarin	Nikita Mikhalkov	Nominated
Spain	The Fencing Master	El maestro de esgrima	Spanish	Pedro Olea	Not nominated
Sweden	House of Angels	Änglagård	Swedish	Colin Nutley	Not nominated
Switzerland	Off Season	Hors saison / Zwischensaison	German, French	Daniel Schmid	Not nominated
Taiwan	Peach Blossom Land	暗戀桃花源	Mandarin	Stan Lai	Not nominated
Turkey	Piano Piano Kid	Piano Piano Bacaksız	Turkish	Tunç Başaran	Not nominated
Uruguay	A Place in the World	Un lugar en el mundo	Spanish	Adolfo Aristarain	Nominated and Disqualified

== Notes ==
- Sweden originally submitted The Best Intentionsby Bille August, and written by Ingmar Bergman. It had won the Palme d'Or at the 1992 Cannes Film Festival. The Academy deemed the film ineligible because the same material had previously aired as a television miniseries before being re-edited as a theatrical film. Sweden submitted House of Angels by Colin Nutley as a replacement.
- Uruguay submitted A Place in the World by Adolfo Aristarain, but it was disqualified after the nominations were announced after the film was deemed an overwhelmingly Argentine production with minimal input from Uruguayans. A Place in the World was initially considered as a possible contender for Argentina's submission to the Academy Awards, but the committee selected The Dark Side of the Heart by Eliseo Subiela instead. Aristarain tried to submit it as Uruguay's entry with the support of Cinematheque of Uruguay director Manuel Martinez Carril, despite opposition from the country's Minister of Education and Culture, Antonio Mercader; however, the Academy disqualified the film on 25 February 1993, after nominations were announced, after it was revealed that the film had insufficient filmmaking input from the submitting country. The Academy declined to select a replacement, leaving four films in competition. Aristarain sued the Academy in the United States District Court for the Central District of California, but the judge upheld its decision. Aristarain abandoned his appeal as Oscar voting was already underway and the ceremony was approaching.
