= Suburban Fury =

- Directed by: Robinson Devor
- Written by: Robinson Devor, Bob Fink, Charles Mudede, Jason Reid
- Produced by: Zachariah Sebastian, Jason Reid
- Cinematography: Sean Kirby
- Edited by: Robinson Devor
- Music by: Paul Matthew Moore
- Release date: 2024 (NYFF)
- Running time: 118 minutes
- Country: United States
- Language: English

Suburban Fury is a 2024 American documentary film directed by Robinson Devor about Sara Jane Moore, the perpetrator of the 1975 assassination attempt on U.S. President Gerald Ford. The documentary was selected to screen in the Main Slate section of the 2024 New York Film Festival.

== Premise ==
After more than thirty years in prison, Sara Jane Moore recalls her path from FBI informant to a thwarted assassin of Gerald Ford.

== Cast ==
- Sara Jane Moore as herself

== Production ==
Devor and Zachariah Sebastian began work on a documentary about Moore in 2010 as she returned to her home in San Francisco on parole after decades in prison. Suburban Fury marks Devor's third collaboration with writer Charles Mudede after Police Beat and Zoo. Production was supported in part by a 2012 grant from the San Francisco Film Society and Cinereach.

== Release ==
Suburban Fury premiered in fall 2024 in the Main Slate section of the New York Film Festival.
