= Attempted assassination of Gerald Ford =

Gerald Ford, President of the United States from 1974 to 1977, had two assassination attempts in California within 17 days of each other in September 1975. Attempted assassination of Gerald Ford may refer to:

- Attempted assassination of Gerald Ford in Sacramento, by Squeaky Fromme
- Attempted assassination of Gerald Ford in San Francisco, by Sara Jane Moore
