= Westin St. Francis =

Hotel in San Francisco, California

The Westin St. Francis

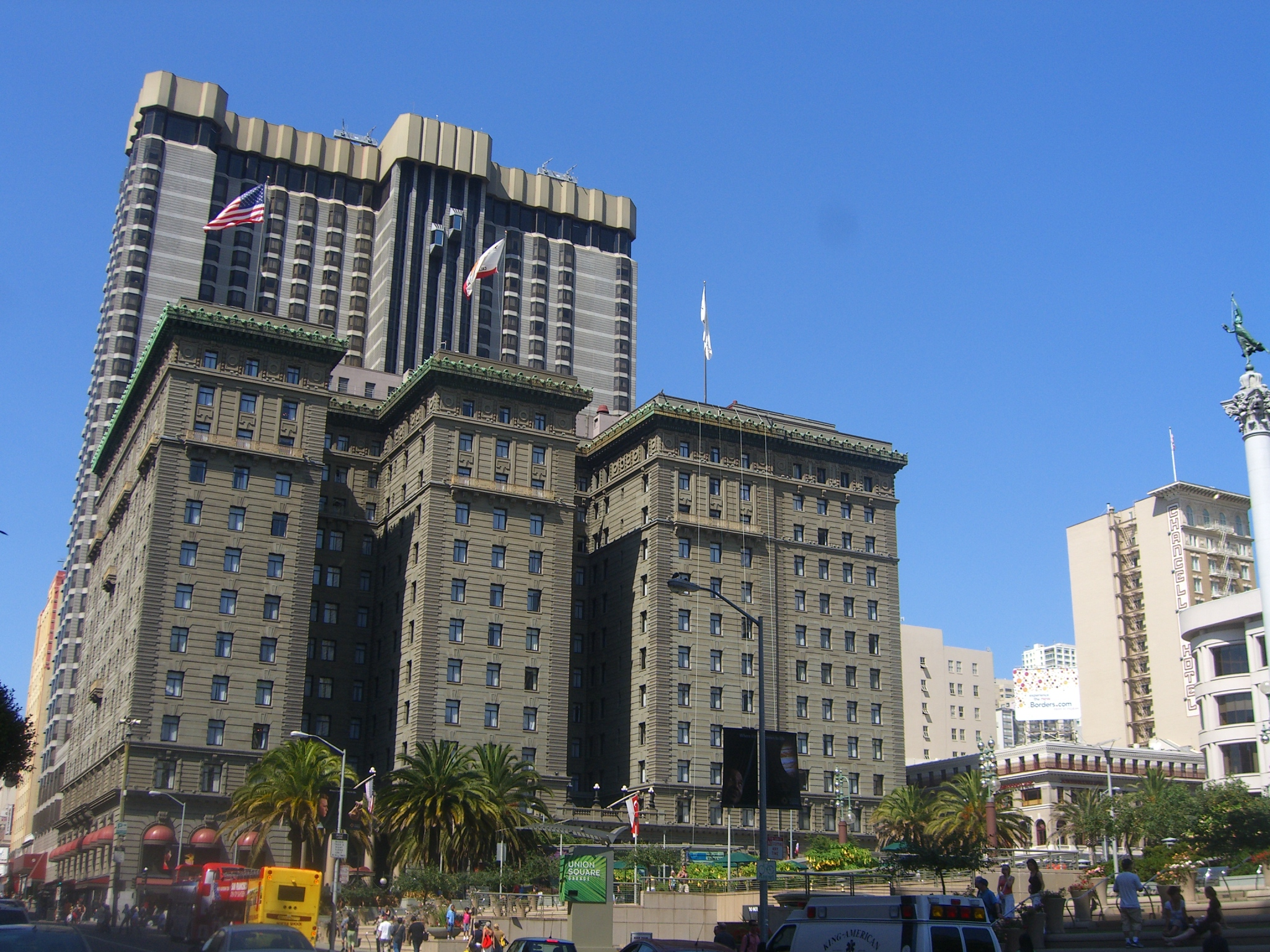

- Location within San Francisco Location within California Location within the United States
- Former names: St. Francis Hotel
- Hotel chain: Westin

General information
- Location: United States, 335 Powell Street; San Francisco, California
- Coordinates: 37.7877°N 122.4084°W
- Opening: 1904 (Landmark Building) 1970 (Tower Building)
- Cost: US$2.5 million
- Owner: Anbang Insurance Group
- Operator: Marriott International

Height
- Height: 60.35 m (198.0 ft); 120 m (390 ft)

Technical details
- Floor count: 16 (Landmark Building) 32 (Tower Building)

Design and construction
- Architects: Walter Danforth Bliss; William Baker Faville; William L. Pereira & Associates

Other information
- Number of rooms: 629 (Landmark Building) 566 (Tower Building) 1,195 (Total)
- Number of suites: 24 (Landmark Building) 35 (Tower Building) 59 (Total)
- Number of restaurants: Michael Mina Restaurant; The Oak Room Restaurant; Caruso's; Clock Bar

Website
- www.marriott.com/hotels/travel/sfouw-the-westin-st-francis-san-francisco-on-union-square/

The Westin St. Francis, formerly known as St. Francis Hotel, is a hotel located on Powell and Geary Streets in San Francisco, adjacent to the whole western edge of Union Square. The two 12-story south wings of the hotel were built in 1904, and the double-width north wing was completed in 1913, initially as apartments for permanent guests. This section is referred to as the Landmark Building on the hotel's website. The 32-story, 120 m (390 ft) tower to the rear, referred to as the Tower Building, which was completed in 1972, features exterior glass elevators that offer panoramic views of the bay and the square below, making the St. Francis one of the largest hotels in the city, with 1,195 rooms and suites.

== History ==
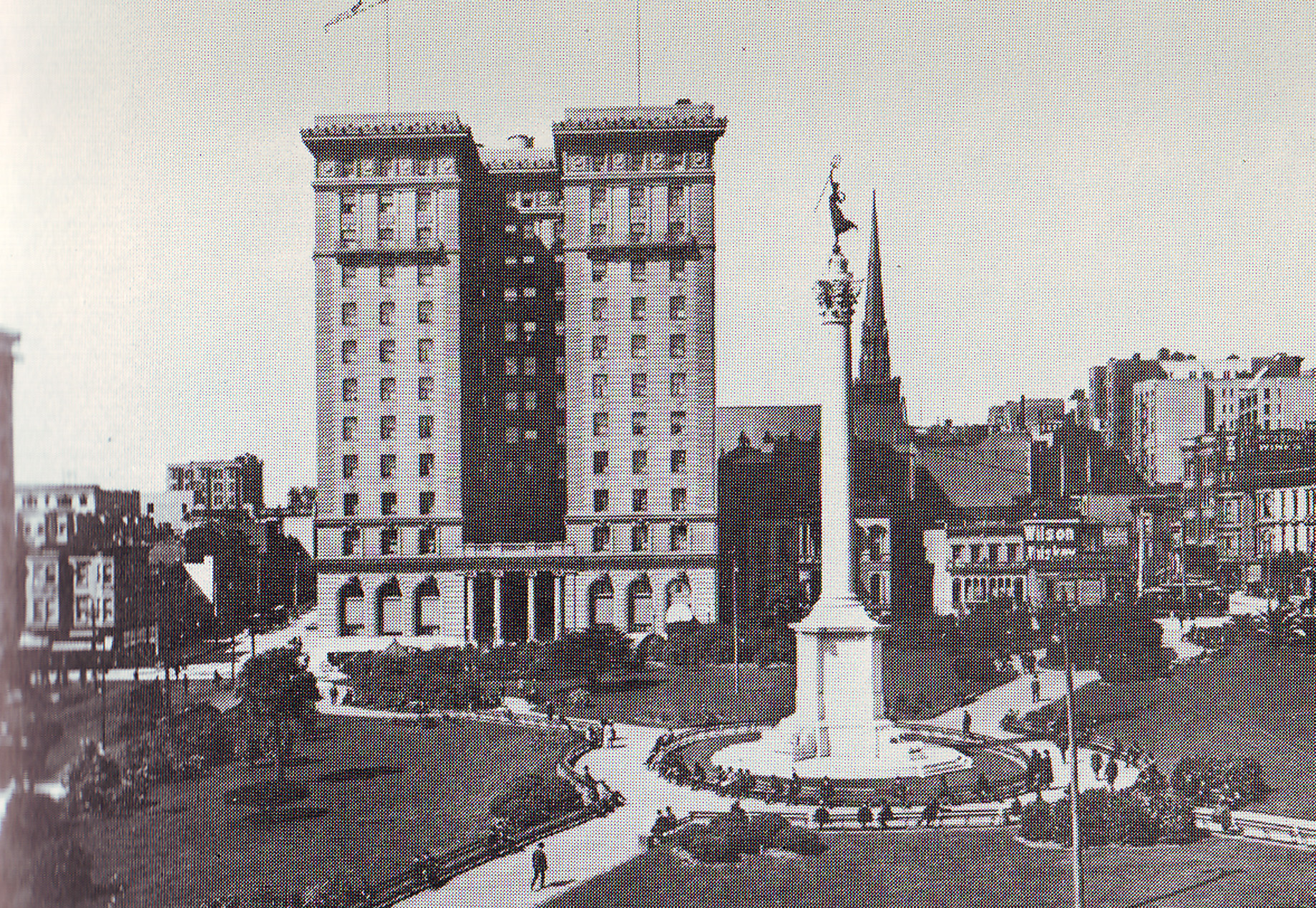
The St. Francis Hotel soon after its opening in 1904

The St. Francis Hotel was begun by the trustees of the estate of Charles Crocker, one of "The Big Four" railroad magnates who had built the western portion of the transcontinental railway. It was built as an investment for Crocker's two young grandchildren, Templeton Crocker and Jenny Crocker. It was originally meant to be called The Crocker Hotel, but instead it took the name of one of the earliest California Gold Rush hotels, the St. Francis.

It was designed by Bliss and Faville in the style of Chicago architect Louis Sullivan, with a relatively bare facade for San Francisco. The hotel opened on March 21, 1904, and, along with the older Palace Hotel on Market Street, immediately became one of the city's most prestigious addresses.

=== 1906 earthquake ===
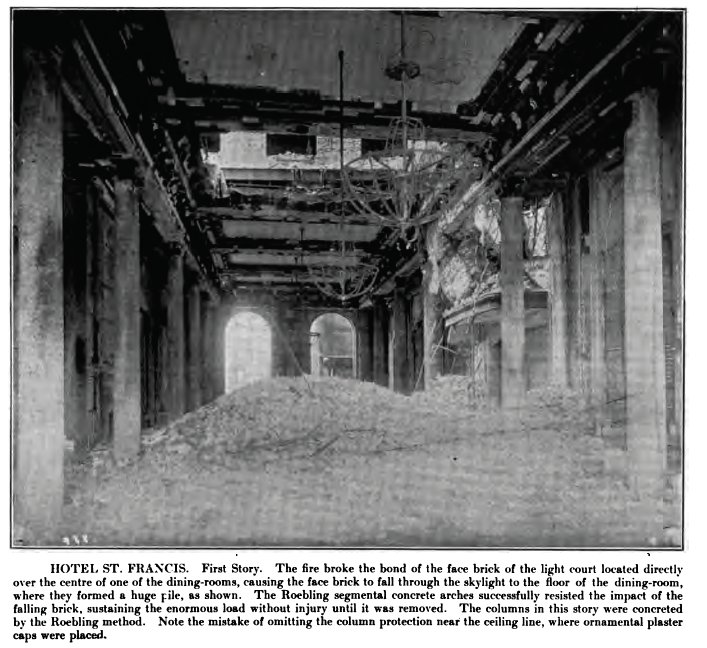
Damage to the dining room from the 1906 fire subsequent to the great earthquake

The San Francisco earthquake of 1906 badly frightened the guests, but did no structural damage to the hotel. John Farish, a mining engineer staying at the hotel, described the experience: "I was awakened by a loud rumbling noise which could be compared to the mixed sound of a strong wind rushing through a forest and the breaking of waves against a cliff...there began a series of the liveliest motions imagineable, accompanied by a creaking, grinding, rasping sound, followed by tremendous crashes as the cornices of adjoining buildings and chimneys tottered to the ground." Actor John Barrymore was also staying at the hotel at the time of the quake reveling with a young woman over champagne. He remained drunk in his evening clothes the following day, searching amidst the chaos for a bar with whiskey.

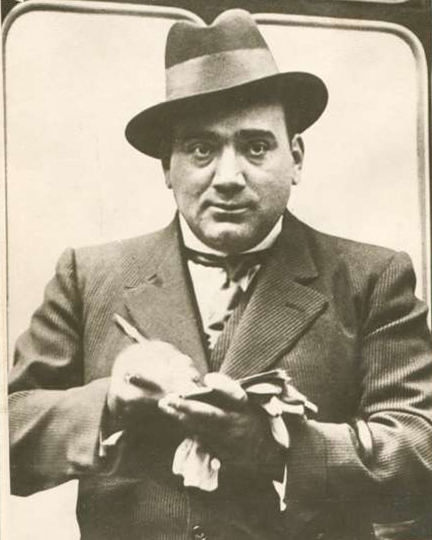
Enrico Caruso

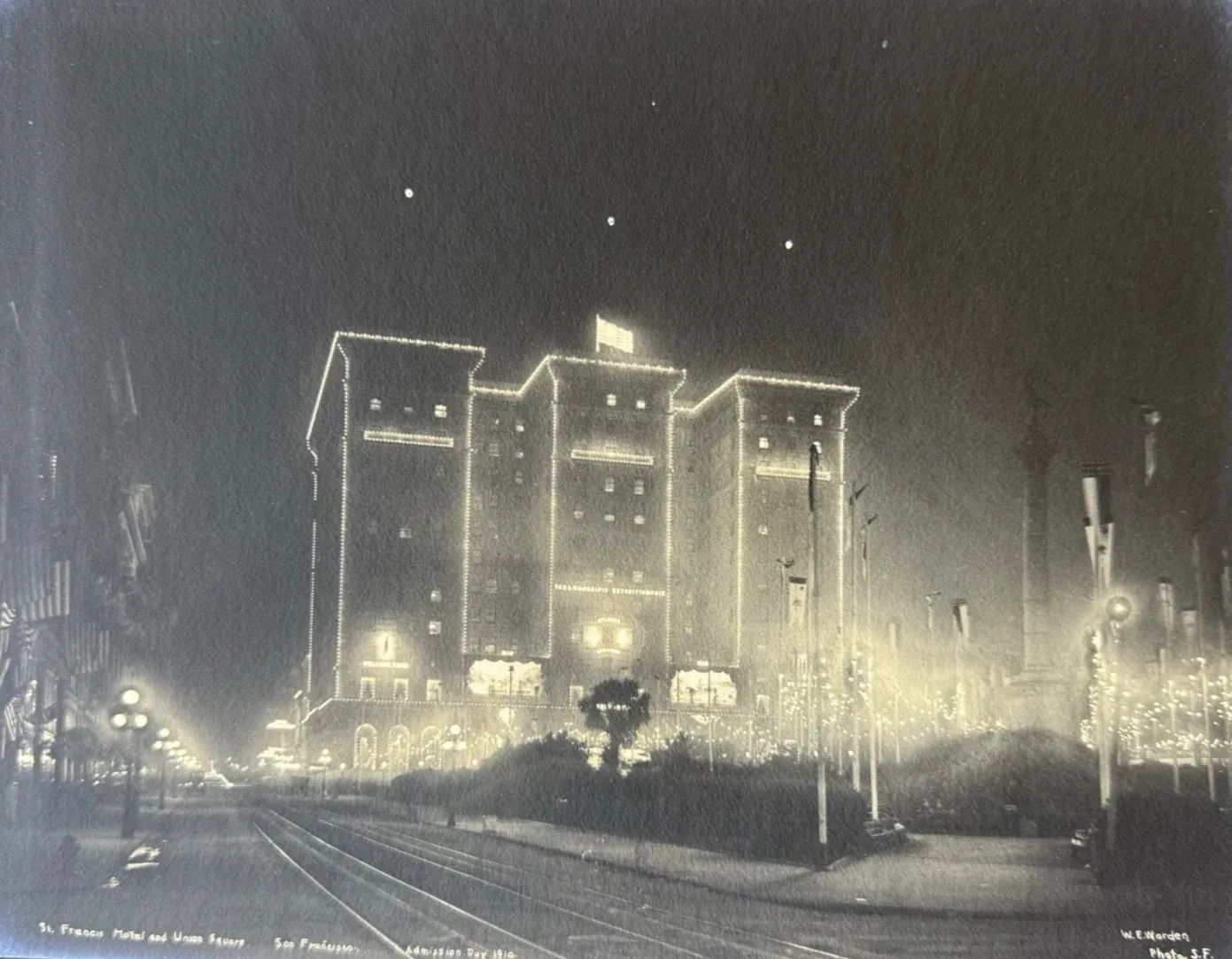
Willard Worden photo, Admission Day, 1910

The earthquake lasted 55 seconds. A hotel page described the pandemonium inside the hotel: "I found the floor crowded with screaming guests running every which way. As the elevators were all out of order the guests headed for the marble stairs, which were broken and cracked and falling below." The hotel manager, James Woods, wearing his bathrobe, tried to calm the guests, but most of them rushed outside onto Union Square. Later in the morning, opera singer Enrico Caruso and Alfred Hertz, the conductor of the San Francisco Symphony, who was hosting a tour by Caruso, who were both staying at the nearby Palace Hotel, fled the Palace and came to the St. Francis, where the restaurant was still open for breakfast. Caruso carried with him a signed photograph of President Theodore Roosevelt, and swore he would never return to San Francisco; he never did, having died in 1921.

The earthquake did not cause major structural damage to the hotel, but it did begin a series of fires along the waterfront which began to sweep west across the city. It also broke the water mains, so firemen were unable to fight the fires. An hour after midnight the fire reached Union Square and gutted the hotel.

When the fire was finally extinguished after three days, it was found that the St. Francis had suffered little serious damage. The copper cornice had warped, and some of the enamelled facing bricks had fallen off in the heat, but otherwise the building was intact. Reconstruction began almost immediately. A small temporary hotel, the little St. Francis, with 110 rooms, was built in the middle of Union Square, to house temporary guests. The hotel re-opened in late 1907.

=== Through the Jazz Age ===
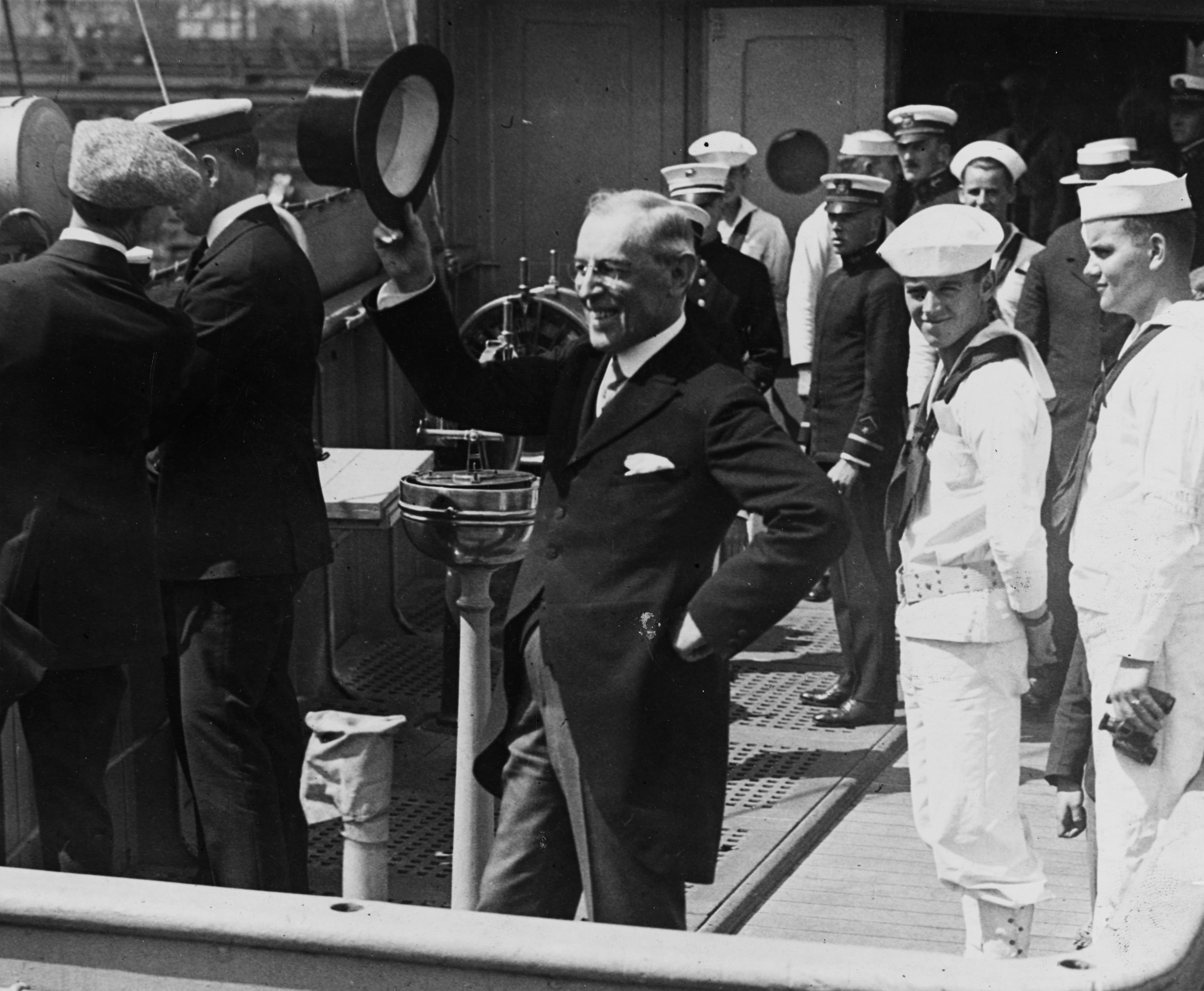
Woodrow Wilson in 1919

After its re-opening, the St. Francis hosted dozens of celebrities who came to San Francisco for the Panama–Pacific International Exposition (PPIE) of 1915, ranging from Helen Keller, three-time Presidential candidate and orator William Jennings Bryan, who came to San Francisco to speak against American involvement in the First World War, and former baseball player and evangelist Billy Sunday, who came to San Francisco to denounce sin and the theory of evolution. The exterior of the hotel appeared in the Keystone Studios newsreel/documentary two-reeler, Mabel and Fatty Viewing the World's Fair at San Francisco, which followed the studio's biggest stars, Mabel Normand and Roscoe Arbuckle, as they toured the city and the PPIE. Former President Theodore Roosevelt stayed at the hotel in July 1915, (about midway through the nine-month-long PPIE) and used the occasion to denounce his bitter enemy, President Woodrow Wilson, and to call for American entry into World War I.

In September 1919, President Woodrow Wilson stayed at the St. Francis as he toured the country as part of his unsuccessful effort to win support for American entry into the League of Nations. The 1920 Democratic National Convention was held in San Francisco, and several presidential candidates stayed at the St. Francis, including another visit from William Jennings Bryan.

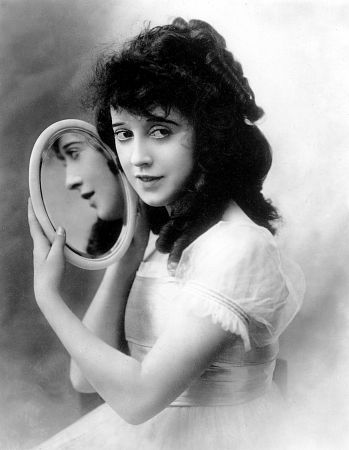
Mabel Normand

During the 1920s, the St. Francis became the fashionable place to stay for celebrities and film actors coming from Hollywood. St. Francis guests included silent film stars Charlie Chaplin, Douglas Fairbanks, Mary Pickford, cowboy star Tom Mix, Mabel Normand, Fatty Arbuckle, and directors D.W. Griffith and Cecil B. DeMille. Other guests included novelist Sinclair Lewis, the first American to win the Nobel Prize for Literature, circus impresarios the Ringling Brothers, dancer Isadora Duncan, songwriter George M. Cohan, and Duke Kahanamoku, the champion swimmer of the world, who popularized the sport of surfing.

One of the appeals of the St. Francis was its jazz orchestra, led by a young musician named Art Hickman. His band, which in 1914 included Bert Kelly, played in the Rose Room of the hotel, before going on to greater fame at the New York Biltmore Hotel and the roof garden of the New Amsterdam Theatre. During his time at the St. Francis, he helped popularize such musicians as Paul Whiteman and Ferde Grofe who, after leaving the St. Francis orchestra, went on to compose the Grand Canyon Suite.

Part of the fame of the St. Francis was because of its legendary chef, Victor Hirtzler. Hirtzler learned to cook in Strasbourg, France, and then cooked for royal courts across Europe. According to Hirtzler, he had created a dish for King Carlos I of Portugal, called La Mousse Faisan Lucullus, a mousse of Bavarian pheasant's breast and woodcock flavored with truffles, with a sauce of cognac, Madeira and champagne. The dish was so expensive, and the King ate it so frequently, that he bankrupted Portugal twice. King Carlos was assassinated in 1908 followed by the downfall of Portuguese monarchy in 1910. Hirtzler then moved to New York, became the chef of the Waldorf Hotel, and then was persuaded by the manager of the St. Francis, James Woods, to move to San Francisco.

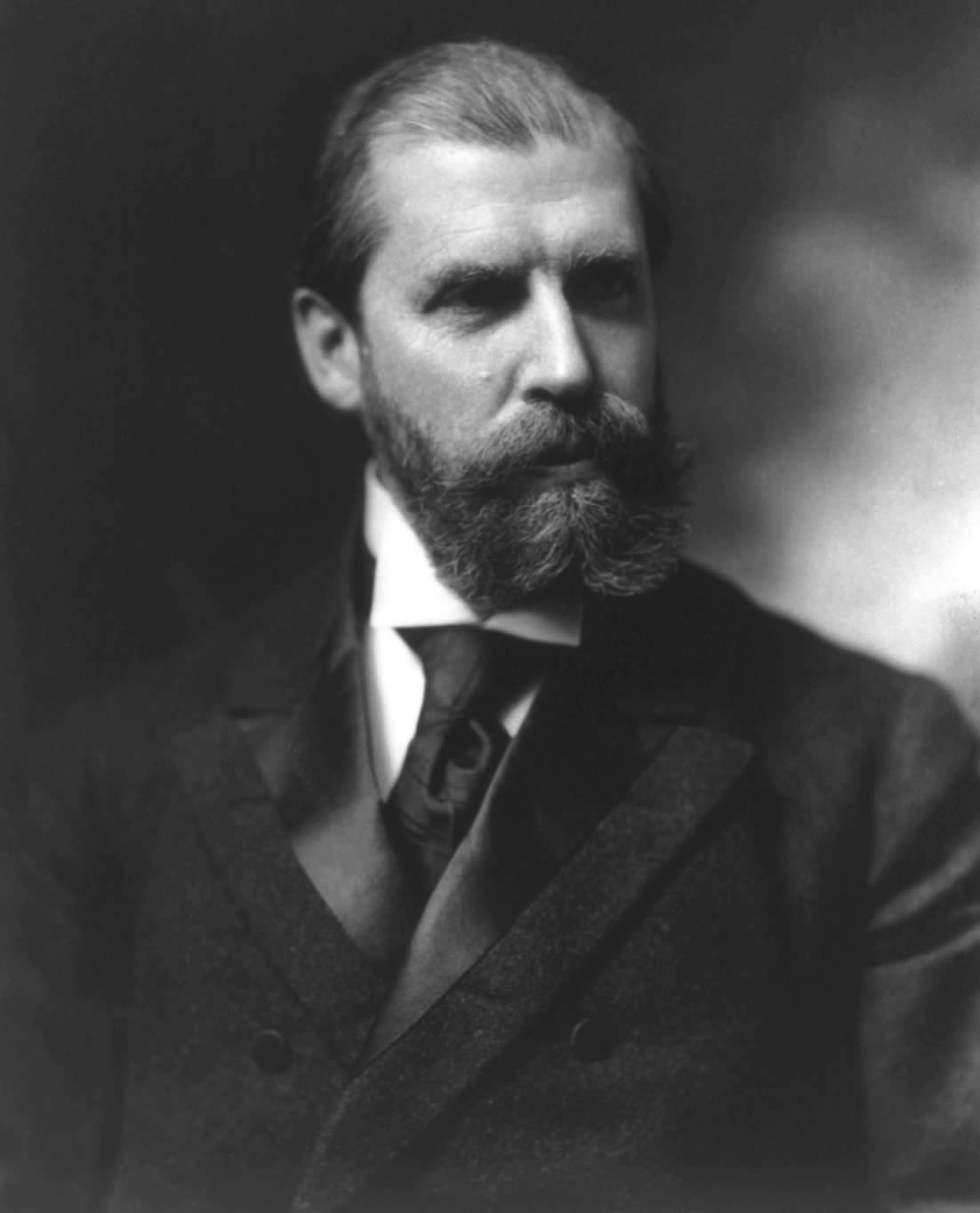
Charles Evans Hughes

In 1916, Hirtzler again cooked a dish which had political consequences. The Crocker family were fervent Republicans and hosted a dinner at the hotel for Charles Evans Hughes, the Republican candidate for President of the United States, who was locked in a close race with incumbent Woodrow Wilson. Twenty minutes before the banquet began, the waiters, who were members of the culinary workers union, went on strike. Hughes wondered if the banquet should be canceled, but Hirtzler insisted upon it going ahead, and served the meal himself. When the union learned that Hughes had crossed a picket line and eaten the dinner, they distributed thousands of leaflets denouncing him as anti-union. On election night, Hughes went to bed believing he had won the election. The next morning he awoke and learned that he had lost California by only 3,673 votes, and by losing California had lost the election to Wilson. The margin of his defeat was less than the turnout of union voters in San Francisco. By saving the dinner, Hirtzler had lost the election for Hughes.

=== Fatty Arbuckle scandal ===
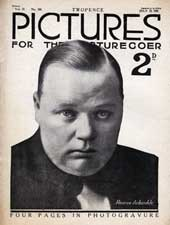
Pictures, July 23, 1921, Roscoe "Fatty" Arbuckle on the cover

In 1921, the St. Francis was the scene of Hollywood's first great scandal. The silent film comedian Roscoe "Fatty" Arbuckle, whose fame at the time rivaled that of Charlie Chaplin, and a number of friends were guests in rooms 1219, 1220 and 1221. On September 5, 1921, they had a party in their suite, with friends and acquaintances from Hollywood. One guest was a young actress from Hollywood named Virginia Rappe. In mid-afternoon Arbuckle summoned a house doctor and reported that Rappe was sick, and the young woman was taken to another room and put to bed. Arbuckle himself went to a personal appearance at a movie theater, and returned to Hollywood the next day.

A few days later Arbuckle learned that Virginia Rappe had been taken to the hospital and had died, and that a friend of the young woman, Maude Delmont, who had been at the party, claimed to police that Arbuckle had assaulted and raped her. (Delmont's testimony was later regarded as unreliable by the police, when it was discovered Delmont had a lengthy prior record of extortion. She was not called as a witness.) The story was soon in the headlines of newspapers around the United States.

Arbuckle was tried for manslaughter in November 1921 in a highly publicized trial. In December, after over 40 hours of deliberations, the jury was unable to reach a verdict. Arbuckle's second trial in January–February 1922 the following year also ended in a hung jury, but in his third trial in March–April 1922, the jury found him not guilty after only five minutes of deliberations.

Arbuckle was free, but his career was ruined. His films were withdrawn by Will H. Hays, the President of the Motion Picture Producers and Distributors of America, and what became known as the Hays Office began the systematic censorship of American motion pictures.

=== 1930s and World War II ===
The 1939 World's Fair on Treasure Island, in San Francisco Bay, attracted many celebrities to San Francisco and to the St. Francis. Salvador Dalí posed for newspaper photographers in the bathtub of his hotel room, with a lobster on his head, holding a cabbage in one hand, and wearing a pair of emerald-green goggles, and Cary Grant stayed in the hotel, entertaining friends with scenes from Noël Coward's play Private Lives.

After the attack on Pearl Harbor, San Francisco became a major transit point for soldiers and sailors going to the Pacific Theater of the War. The shops in the lobby of the St. Francis were turned into small rooms for military officers. Hundreds of soldiers, sailors and officers danced in the Mural Room of the St. Francis to the big band music of Harry Owens and the Royal Hawaiians, and his vocalist, Hilo Hattie. Swiss headwaiter Ernest E. Gloor ran the Mural Room for a quarter of a century with an iron hand. As Maître d'hôtel, he would "dress" his room with the Fashionable up front.

In April 1945, the St. Francis played host to twenty-seven delegations attending the founding meeting of the United Nations, held in the San Francisco Opera House. The St. Francis was host to the delegations from Iran, Canada, Turkey, Egypt and France, represented by French foreign minister Georges Bidault, who stayed in the same suite where the Fatty Arbuckle scandal had taken place. The St. Francis also hosted several Latin American delegations, along with the U.S. Under Secretary of State for the Americas, Nelson Rockefeller. The Soviet delegation, led by Soviet foreign minister V.M. Molotov, and the Soviet ambassador to the United States, Andrei Gromyko, also stayed at the St. Francis.

=== 1950s to the present ===
In April 1951, the St. Francis hosted General Douglas MacArthur, who received a tumultuous welcome when he returned from Korea after having been dismissed from command by President Harry Truman. Entertainer Al Jolson died while playing cards in his suite at the St. Francis on October 23, 1950—Jolson had just returned from entertaining the troops in Korea.

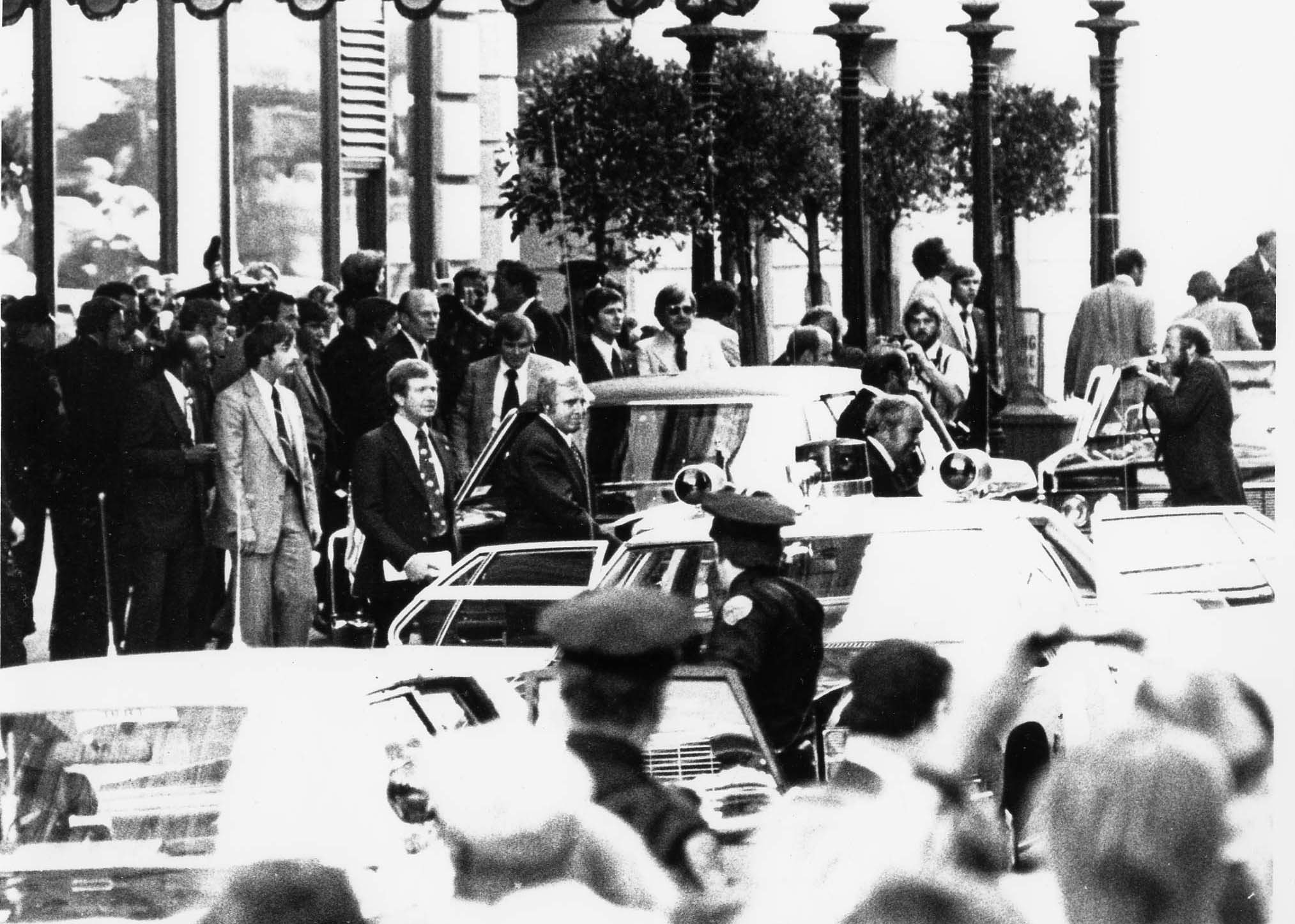
President Gerald Ford, Secret Service personnel and bystanders pictured outside the St. Francis immediately after an assassination attempt by Sara Jane Moore.

The St. Francis was still owned by the Crocker family until the end of World War II, when the Crocker family sold it to hotel magnate Ben Swig, who then sold it to Edwin B. DeGolia. In 1954, the hotel became the twenty-third property in the Seattle-based Western Hotels chain, which eventually became Western International.

With its acquisition by Western Hotels, the hotel was changed from a home of elderly San Francisco socialites, some of whom lived in large suites, to a modern hotel focusing on tourism and especially conventions. The old Mural Room, decorated by Albert Herter in 1913 with seven murals comprising The Pageant of Nations, a banquet and ballroom which had hosted many of America's famous big bands, was replaced in 1970 by a six hundred room tower, designed to help the St. Francis compete with The Fairmont, its rival on nearby Nob Hill. Architect William Pereira designed the new building, which was completed in 1972. The murals were rolled up and removed to storage. In September 1975, the hotel's MacArthur Suite was rented by MOS Technology to sell their then brand-new 6502 processors that the nearby Wescon trade show didn't permit them to.

The St. Francis became the hotel where Republican presidents stayed when in San Francisco, while Democratic presidents usually stayed at the Fairmont. President Gerald Ford was almost shot while leaving the hotel on September 22, 1975 by a woman named Sara Jane Moore. A former Marine, Oliver Sipple, moved her hand so that Ford was not hit. Presidents John F. Kennedy and Ronald Reagan were guests of the hotel. The St. Francis also hosted many world leaders, including Queen Elizabeth II and Emperor Hirohito of Japan.

When Western International became Westin Hotels in 1981, the hotel was also renamed, becoming The Westin St. Francis.

In March 2016, Anbang Insurance Group, a Beijing-based Chinese insurance company, purchased the property as part of a $6.5 billion deal involving the St. Francis and 15 other luxury hotels and resorts.

In April 2018, the hotel completed a four-year renovation of its landmark building at a cost of $45 million. Work included redecorating guest rooms and corridors, enlarging some bathrooms to include walk-in showers and upgrading the elevator systems to use destination dispatch.

=== Labor relations ===
Beginning in November 2009 Unite Here Local 2, representing San Francisco hotel workers, asked the public to boycott the Westin St. Francis Hotel because the hotel's owner, Starwood had not renewed a previously settled contract with workers with respect to wages, benefits, and working conditions. The hotel was one of eight in San Francisco boycotted, and was scene to many protests including picketing. and even a flash mob. In April 2011, the union reached an agreement with Starwood.

==== 2024 strike ====
In September 2024, workers at the Westin St. Francis Hotel went on strike. On December 24, 2024, a four-year labor agreement was ratified, thus bringing the strike to an end.

== The hotel today ==
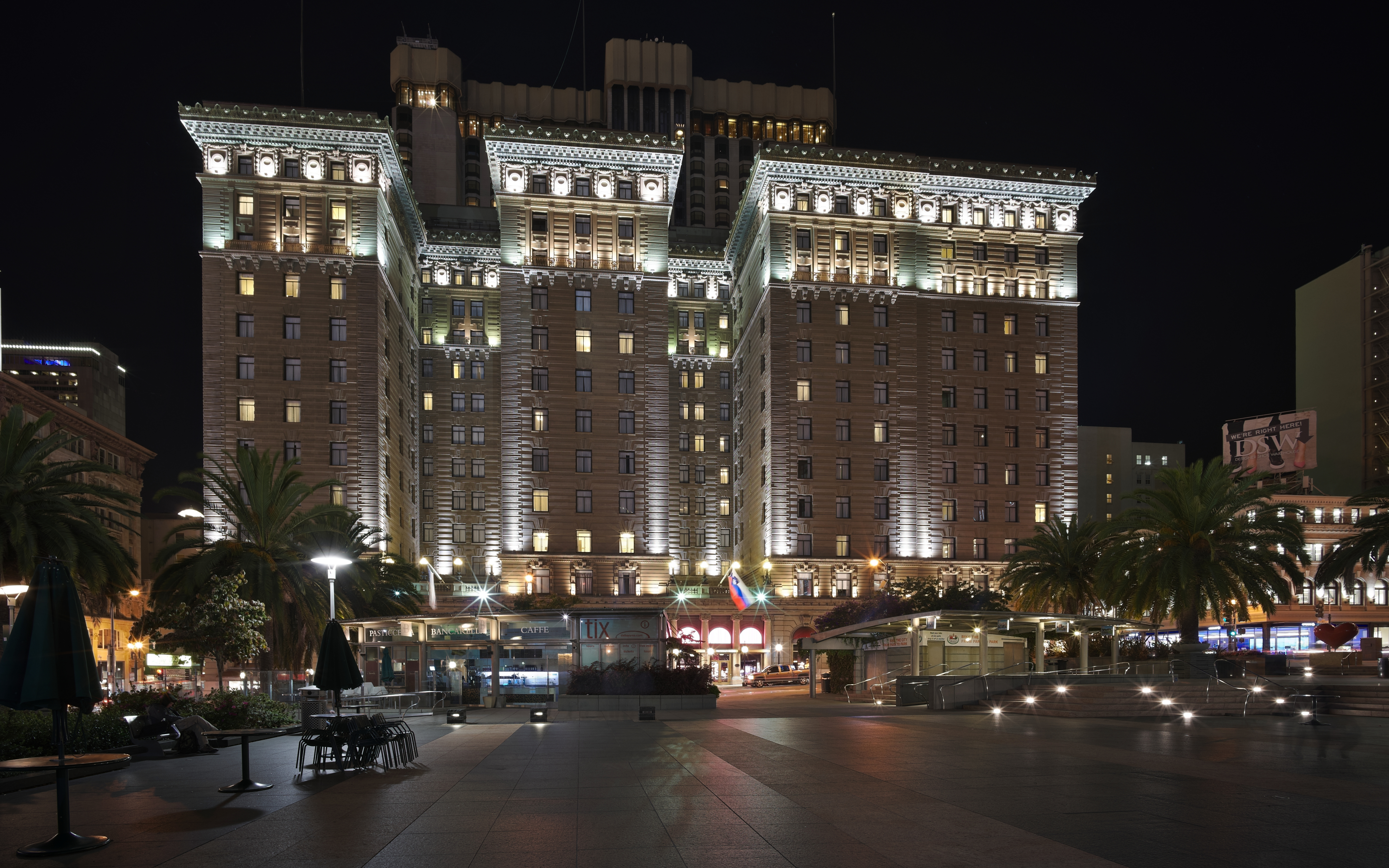
The hotel seen at night in September 2016

The hotel is distinctive for a historic lobby master clock, the first in the Western United States, and celebrity chef Michael Mina's Bourbon Steakhouse restaurant, which replaced his self-named restaurant and was formerly the Compass Rose and before that the Patent Leather Bar, designed by Timothy L. Pflueger.

The hotel displays a small collection of photographic prints produced by Ansel Adams to advertise the former Patent Leather Bar, and keeps some old traditions such as an official hotel historian and the industry's only remaining coin cleaning service for guests.

A collection of hotel memorabilia is on display in the lobby, arranged by decade and featuring items such as vintage keys, dining ware, room service bills, photographs, and media articles.

== See also ==
- List of tallest buildings in San Francisco
