= Sara Jane Moore =

American convicted of presidential assassination attempt (1930–2025)

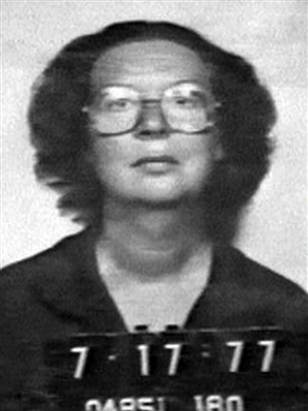
- Moore's 1977 mugshot
- Born: Sara Jane Kahn; February 15, 1930; Charleston, West Virginia, U.S.
- Died: September 24, 2025 (aged 95); Franklin, Tennessee, U.S.
- Occupation: Accountant
- Spouses: Sydney L. Manning (divorced); John O. Aalberg (divorced); Willard J. Carmel Jr. (m. 1969; div. 1973); Philip Chase (m. 2010; died 2018)
- Children: 5
- Status: Paroled after 32 years
- Motive: Spark a violent revolution that would lead to the U.S. government being overthrown
- Convictions: Attempting to kill the President
- Penalty: Life imprisonment

Sara Jane Moore (née Kahn; February 15, 1930 – September 24, 2025) was an American accountant and FBI informant who attempted to assassinate U.S. president Gerald Ford in 1975.

Moore believed the attack would spark a violent revolution across the nation that would lead to the U.S. government being overthrown for how they handled the Vietnam War. She was given a life sentence for the attempted assassination, but she was released from prison on December 31, 2007, after serving 32 years.

Moore and Lynette "Squeaky" Fromme are the only two women who have attempted to assassinate an American president. Both attempts were on Gerald Ford and took place in California within three weeks of one another.

== Early life ==
Sara Jane Kahn was born in Charleston, West Virginia, on February 15, 1930, the daughter of Ruth (née Moore) and Olaf Kahn. Her paternal grandparents were German Jewish immigrants. Moore graduated from Stonewall Jackson High School. She was raised in her mother's Christian faith, but later converted to her father's Judaism in 1986.

But, according to The Charleston Gazette, her name was Sara Jane Kahn. Moore was said to be the maiden name of Miss Kahn's mother. Sara Moore was classmate of Sara Jane Kahn in the class of 1945 at Stonewall Jackson High School there; members of that class said Sara Moore was now a secretary at the West Virginia state house and the person arrested in San Francisco yesterday was their classmate, Sara Jane Kahn. And another Sara Moore is a housewife in San Jose. Calif., a copy of whose driver's license the suspect reportedly carried in her purse yesterday. She evidently took the name Moore from one or all of those other persons. (23 September 1975) The New York Times

== Adult life ==
Moore had been a nursing school student, Women's Army Corps recruit, and accountant. Divorced five times, she had four children before she turned to revolutionary politics in 1975.

== People in Need ==
Moore's friends said that she had a fascination and an obsession with Patricia Hearst. After Hearst was kidnapped by the Symbionese Liberation Army (SLA), Hearst's father, Randolph Hearst, created the organization People in Need (PIN) to feed the poor, as a response to the SLA's claims that the elder Hearst was committing "crimes" against "the people". Moore, a volunteer bookkeeper for PIN, had been serving as an FBI informant there until the moment she attempted to assassinate Ford.

== Attempted assassination of Gerald Ford ==
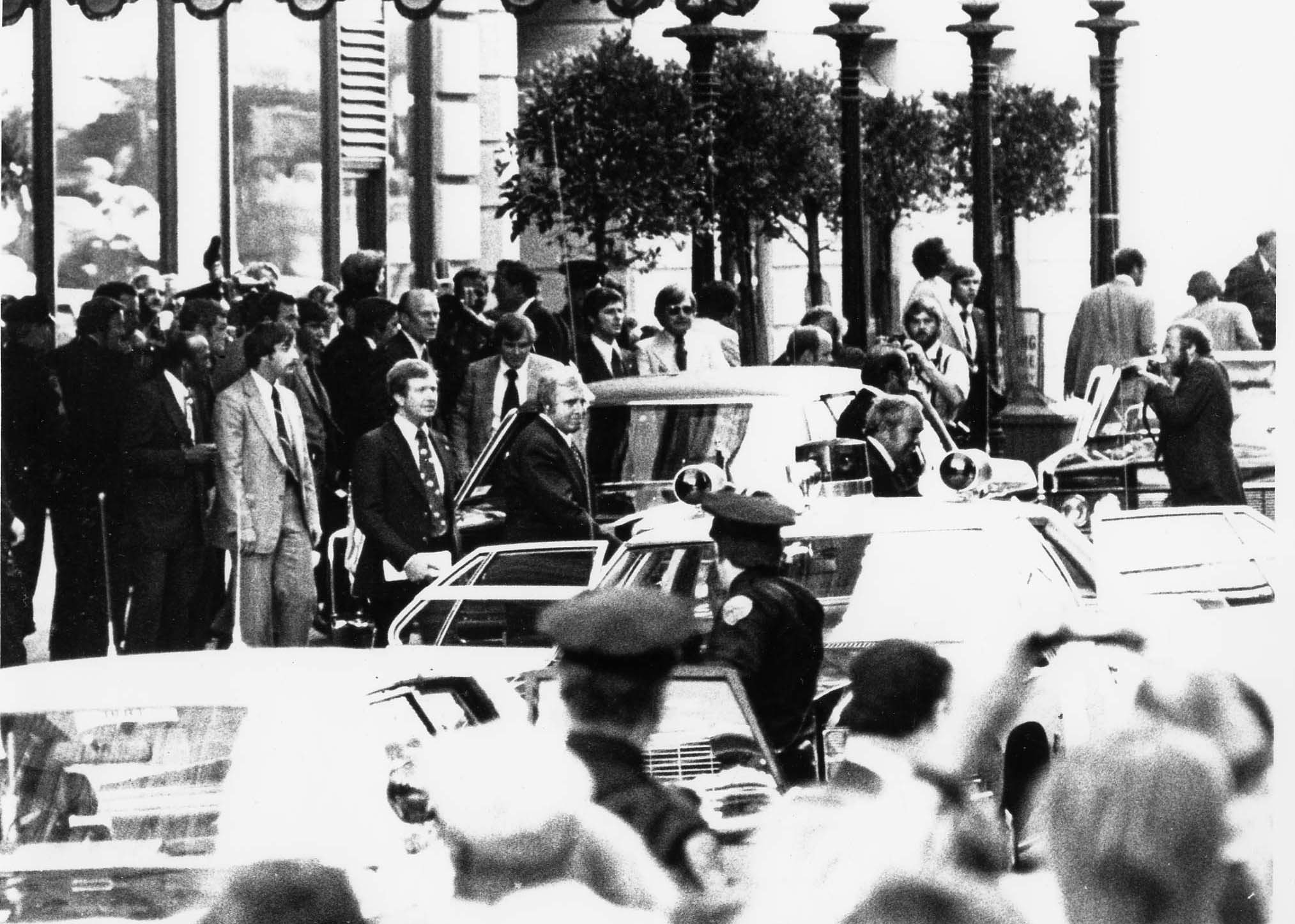
Ford exits the St. Francis Hotel in San Francisco seconds before Moore attempted to shoot him.

Moore had been evaluated by the Secret Service earlier in 1975, but agents decided that she posed no danger to the president. She had been arrested by police on an illegal-handgun charge the day before the Ford incident, but was released. The police confiscated her .44-caliber Charter Arms Bulldog revolver and 113 rounds of ammunition.

Moore's assassination attempt took place in San Francisco on September 22, 1975, 17 days after Lynette Fromme's attempted assassination of Ford. She was standing in the crowd across the street from the St. Francis Hotel, and she was about 40 feet (12 m) away from Ford when she fired a single shot at him with a .38 caliber revolver. She was using a gun that she had bought in haste that same morning; as a result, she did not know that the sights were 15 cm (6 inches) off the point of impact at that distance, causing her to narrowly miss.

After realizing that she had missed, Moore raised her arm again, and Oliver Sipple, a former Marine, dived toward her and grabbed her arm, possibly saving Ford's life. Sipple said at the time: "I saw [her gun] pointed out there and I grabbed for it. [...] I lunged and grabbed the woman's arm and the gun went off." The bullet from the second shot ricocheted and hit John Ludwig, a 42-year-old taxi driver, who survived. U.S. District Judge Samuel Conti, who sentenced Moore, voiced his opinion that Moore would have killed Ford had she had her own gun, and it was only "because her gun was faulty" that the president's life was spared.

During an interview she conducted in 2009, Moore stated that her motive was to spark a violent revolution that would lead to the U.S. government being overthrown for how they handled the Vietnam War.

== Trial and imprisonment ==
Moore pled guilty to attempting to kill Ford and was sentenced to life in prison. At her sentencing hearing Moore stated; "Am I sorry I tried? Yes and no. Yes, because it accomplished little except to throw away the rest of my life. And, no, I'm not sorry I tried, because at the time it seemed a correct expression of my anger." She served her term at the federal women's prison in Dublin, California, where she worked in the UNICOR prison labor program for $1.25 per hour as the Lead Inmate Operating Accountant. Moore had the Federal Bureau of Prisons register number 04851-180. In 1979, Moore escaped, but she was captured several hours later.

During a 2004 interview, Ford described Moore as "off her mind". He said he continued to make public appearances, even after two attempts on his life within such a short period of time, because "a president has to be aggressive, has to meet the people."

== Release and death ==
On December 31, 2007, at the age of 77, Moore was released from prison on parole after serving 32 years of her life sentence; her release came just over a year after Ford died from natural causes on December 26, 2006. Moore later stated that she regretted the assassination attempt, saying she was "blinded by her radical political views". Moore was released under a policy that required parole hearings for inmates who had served at least 30 years of a life sentence and maintained a clean disciplinary record. When asked about her crime in an interview, Moore stated, "I am very glad I did not succeed. I know now that I was wrong to try." Upon her release, she changed her name and moved to North Carolina. She was later married to psychologist Philip Chase until his death in 2018. After Chase's death, it was revealed that his will had been modified several times, and that Moore had told Chase to disinherit his children.

In February 2019, at age 89, Moore was arrested for violating her parole by failing to tell her parole officer about a trip she went on outside the country; she was imprisoned and subsequently released in August 2019.

Moore died at a nursing facility in Franklin, Tennessee, on September 24, 2025, at the age of 95.

== Media appearances ==
In 1978, Moore appeared on KPIX interviewed in prison by news reporter Ben Williams.

On May 28, 2009, Moore appeared on NBC's Today program, her first television appearance since she left prison on parole. Moore also discussed her 1979 escape from prison. She revealed that an inmate told her, "when jumping the fence just put your hand on the barbed wire, you'll only have a few puncture wounds." She went on to say, "If I knew that I was going to be captured several hours later, I would have stopped at the local bar just to get a drink and a burger."

On September 22, 2015, she appeared on CNN, saying "I was always a pretty good citizen."

Excerpts from an interview with Moore by Latif Nasser appear on an episode of the radio program Radiolab titled "Oliver Sipple", which was released on September 22, 2017. In the interview, Moore discusses the scene from the day she attempted to assassinate Ford and her perspective of being stopped by Oliver Sipple.

== Works about Moore ==
Moore is a character in Stephen Sondheim and John Weidman's musical Assassins, which is about presidential assassins, both successful and unsuccessful.

A biography of Moore called Taking Aim at the President was published in 2009 by Geri Spieler, a writer who had a correspondence with Moore for 28 years.

Suburban Fury, a 2024 Robinson Devor documentary about Moore, filmed after her release from prison, was selected to screen in the Main Slate section of the 2024 New York Film Festival.
