= Bibliography of Gerald Ford =

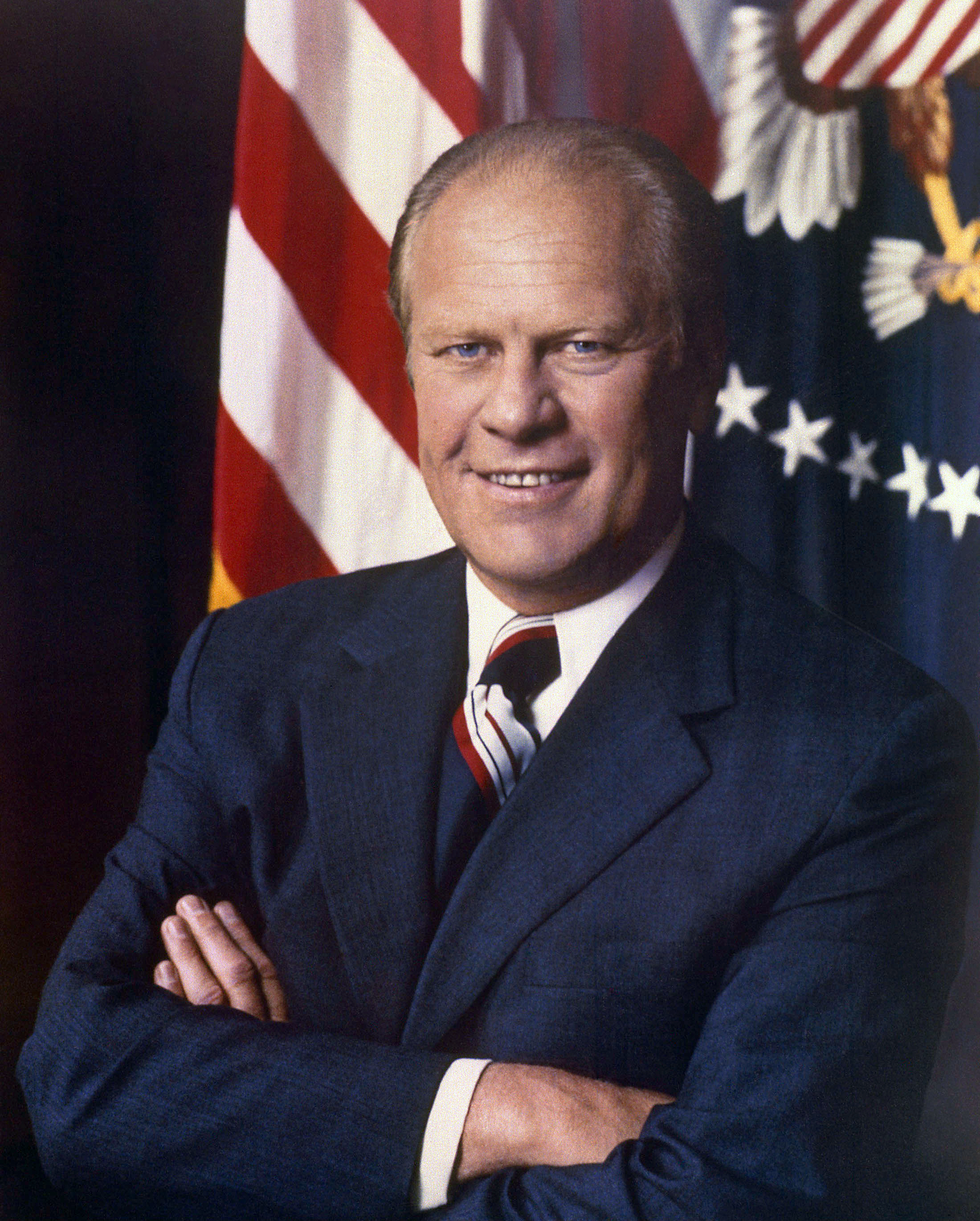
- Gerald Ford (1913–2006)
- Subject: Gerald Ford
- Scope: Books, journal articles, book chapters
- Period covered: July 14, 1913 – December 26, 2006
- Languages: English
- Part of bibliography series about: President of the United States
- Related bibliographies: Bibliography of Jimmy Carter; Bibliography of Richard Nixon; Bibliography of Ronald Reagan
- Related timelines: Timeline of the Gerald Ford presidency; Timeline of the Jimmy Carter presidency
- Related outlines and indexes: List of bibliographies of presidents of the United States; List of presidents of the United States; Outline of the history of the United States

This is a select bibliography of academic level books and journal articles, published mainly after World War II about the history of Gerald Ford and necessary historical context.

Gerald Rudolph Ford Jr. (born Leslie Lynch King Jr.; July 14, 1913 – December 26, 2006) was the 38th president of the United States, serving from 1974 to 1977. A Republican from Michigan, he sat in the United States House of Representatives for twenty-five years and was House minority leader from 1965 until 1973, when Richard Nixon named him the 40th vice president. Ford succeeded to the presidency on August 9, 1974, on Nixon's resignation in the Watergate scandal, and is the only person to have held the office without having been elected either president or vice president.

Gerald Ford's tenure as the 38th president of the United States began on August 9, 1974, when he was sworn in following Nixon's resignation, and ended on January 20, 1977. One month into the term he granted Nixon a full pardon, a decision that ended the goodwill with which he had taken office. His presidency was shaped by a slumping economy, repeated conflict with a Democratic Congress over taxes, federal spending and energy policy, and the collapse of South Vietnam. Ford held off a nomination challenge from Ronald Reagan in 1976 and then lost the general election to Jimmy Carter.

Bibliography contains academic level English language books (including translations) and journal articles, published mainly post World War II. (Note: Works published before World War II should be limited to areas where there are no significant post-World War II books on the subject or when the work in question has significant historical merit.) Book entries may have references to reviews published in academic journals or major newspapers when these could be considered helpful. These reference reviews also function as a resource to find other works on this subject.

Works listed here are cited in the notes or bibliographies of scholarly sources. Each is published by an academic or major trade press, written by a recognized expert, or substantially reviewed in scholarly journals; borderline cases are omitted. A selection of primary sources is included. Many of the books below carry their own bibliographies; see Further reading section for longer ones, and External links section for historical sites and museums.

Citations follow APA style. (Note: Entries are in plain text APA 7 format without templates; templates are used only for reviews and notes.) Books have citations to academic journal or mainstream published reviews when available. For books only partly about the subject, give relevant chapter or section titles where useful and available. Translators of the original-language edition are included when possible. In cases where a title or name has appeared with more than one English spelling, the most recent published form is used and a footnote documents any earlier title under which the work appeared.

== General biographies ==
- Brinkley, D. (2007). Gerald R. Ford. Times Books.
- Cannon, J. M. (1994). Time and chance: Gerald Ford's appointment with history. HarperCollins.
- Cannon, J. M. (2013). Gerald R. Ford: An honorable life. University of Michigan Press. doi:10.3998/mpub.135548
- Greene, J. R. (1995). The presidency of Gerald R. Ford. University Press of Kansas.
- Hersey, J. (1975). The President. Knopf.
- Mieczkowski, Y. (2005). Gerald Ford and the challenges of the 1970s. University Press of Kentucky. doi:10.5810/kentucky/9780813123493.001.0001
- Reeves, R. (1975). A Ford, not a Lincoln. Harcourt Brace Jovanovich.
- Smith, R. N. (2023). An ordinary man: The surprising life and historic presidency of Gerald R. Ford. Harper.
- Werth, B. (2006). 31 days: The crisis that gave us the government we have today. Nan A. Talese.

== Life before the presidency and family ==
- Dubriwny, T. N. (2008). Constructing breast cancer in the news. Journal of Communication Inquiry, 33(2), 104–125. doi:10.1177/0196859908329090
- Greene, J. R. (2004). Betty Ford: Candor and courage in the White House. University Press of Kansas. JSTOR j.ctvm202cd
- Gritter, M. (2023). Gerald Ford: A minority legislator promoting New Right Lite. Social Science Quarterly, 104(7), 1383–1391. doi:10.1111/ssqu.13317
- Kaufman, S. (2015). Gerald Ford: From Michigan to Washington. In S. Kaufman (Ed.), A companion to Gerald R. Ford and Jimmy Carter (pp. 50–63). Wiley-Blackwell. doi:10.1002/9781118907634.ch3
- Steensma, D. P. (2024). First lady Betty Ford: A legacy of transparency. Mayo Clinic Proceedings, 99(7), 1194–1196. doi:10.1016/j.mayocp.2024.05.006

== Presidency ==
- Crain, A. D. (2015). The presidency and the pardon. In S. Kaufman (Ed.), A companion to Gerald R. Ford and Jimmy Carter (pp. 80–94). Wiley-Blackwell. doi:10.1002/9781118907634.ch5
- Davy, R. (2009). Helsinki myths: Setting the record straight on the Final Act of the CSCE, 1975. Cold War History, 9(1), 1–22. doi:10.1080/14682740802490380
- Friedman, J. (2010). Gerald Ford, the Mayaguez incident, and the post-imperial presidency. Congress & the Presidency, 37(1), 22–44. doi:10.1080/07343460903390695
- Gawthorpe, A. J. (2009). The Ford administration and security policy in the Asia-Pacific after the fall of Saigon. The Historical Journal, 52(3), 697–716. doi:10.1017/s0018246x09990082
- Graham, M. (2011). Covert collusion? American and South African relations in the Angolan Civil War, 1974–1976. African Historical Review, 43(1), 28–47. doi:10.1080/17532523.2011.596619
- Greene, J. R. (1992). The limits of power: The Nixon and Ford administrations. Indiana University Press.
- Hanhimäki, J. M. (2004). The flawed architect: Henry Kissinger and American foreign policy. Oxford University Press. doi:10.1093/acprof:oso/9780195172218.001.0001
- Head, R. G., Short, F. W., & McFarlane, R. C. (1978). Crisis resolution: Presidential decision making in the Mayaguez and Korean confrontations. Westview Press.
- Hurwitz, L., Green, B., & Segal, H. E. (1976). International press reactions to the resignation and pardon of Richard M. Nixon: A content analysis of four elite newspapers. Comparative Politics, 9(1), 107. JSTOR 421294
- Johnson, L. K. (2008). The Church Committee investigation of 1975 and the evolution of modern intelligence accountability. Intelligence and National Security, 23(2), 198–225. doi:10.1080/02684520801977337
- Kampmark, B. (2015). Détente's disintegration, neoconservatism, and the Ford presidency. In S. Kaufman (Ed.), A companion to Gerald R. Ford and Jimmy Carter (pp. 130–148). Wiley-Blackwell. doi:10.1002/9781118907634.ch8
- Lichten, E. (1980). The fiscal crisis of New York City and the development of austerity. Insurgent Sociologist, 9(2–3), 75–92. doi:10.1177/089692058000900207
- Mieczkowski, Y. (2015). Gerald R. Ford's domestic policy. In S. Kaufman (Ed.), A companion to Gerald R. Ford and Jimmy Carter (pp. 95–113). Wiley-Blackwell. doi:10.1002/9781118907634.ch6
- Moran, A. D. (2011). More than a caretaker: The economic policy of Gerald R. Ford. Presidential Studies Quarterly, 41(1), 39–63. doi:10.1111/j.1741-5705.2010.03830.x
- Nitze, P. H. (1975). The Vladivostok accord and SALT II. The Review of Politics, 37(2), 147–160. doi:10.1017/s0034670500023214
- Olmsted, K. S. (2015). US intelligence agencies during the Ford years. In S. Kaufman (Ed.), A companion to Gerald R. Ford and Jimmy Carter (pp. 114–129). Wiley-Blackwell. doi:10.1002/9781118907634.ch7
- Walker, V. (2015). Détente's limits: Caught between cooperation and confrontation. In S. Kaufman (Ed.), A companion to Gerald R. Ford and Jimmy Carter (pp. 5–26). Wiley-Blackwell. doi:10.1002/9781118907634.ch1

== Vietnam War and its aftermath ==
- Baskir, L. M., & Strauss, W. A. (1978). Chance and circumstance: The draft, the war, and the Vietnam generation. Knopf.
- Bergquist, K. J. S. (2009). Operation Babylift or babyabduction? Implications of the Hague Convention on the humanitarian evacuation and "rescue" of children. International Social Work, 52(5), 621–633. doi:10.1177/0020872809337677
- Bon Tempo, C. J. (2008). Americans at the gate: The United States and refugees during the Cold War. Princeton University Press.
- Espiritu, Y. L. (2014). Body counts: The Vietnam War and militarized refuge(es). University of California Press.
- Isaacs, A. R. (1983). Without honor: Defeat in Vietnam and Cambodia. Johns Hopkins University Press.
- Jespersen, T. C. (2000). The bitter end and the lost chance in Vietnam: Congress, the Ford administration, and the battle over Vietnam, 1975–76. Diplomatic History, 24(2), 265–293. doi:10.1111/0145-2096.00212
- Jespersen, T. C. (2002). Kissinger, Ford, and Congress: The very bitter end in Vietnam. Pacific Historical Review, 71(3), 439–473. doi:10.1525/phr.2002.71.3.439
- Lipman, J. K. (2012). "Give us a ship": The Vietnamese repatriate movement on Guam, 1975. American Quarterly, 64(1), 1–31. doi:10.1353/aq.2012.0007
- Lipman, J. K. (2014). A refugee camp in America: Fort Chaffee and Vietnamese and Cuban refugees, 1975–1982. Journal of American Ethnic History, 33(2), 57–87. doi:10.5406/jamerethnhist.33.2.0057
- Varzally, A. (2009). Vietnamese adoptions and the politics of atonement. Adoption & Culture, 2(1), 159–201. doi:10.1353/ado.2009.0008
- Varzally, A. (2017). Children of reunion: Vietnamese adoptions and the politics of family migrations. University of North Carolina Press. doi:10.5149/northcarolina/9781469630915.001.0001

== Background ==
- Berkowitz, E. D. (2006). Something happened: A political and cultural overview of the seventies. Columbia University Press.
- Borstelmann, T. (2012). The 1970s: A new global history from civil rights to economic inequality. Princeton University Press. doi:10.23943/princeton/9780691141565.001.0001
- Carroll, P. N. (1982). It seemed like nothing happened: The tragedy and promise of America in the 1970s. Holt, Rinehart and Winston.
- Cowie, J. (2010). Stayin' alive: The 1970s and the last days of the working class. New Press.
- Farber, D., & Bailey, B. (Eds.). (2004). America in the seventies. University Press of Kansas. doi:10.1353/book102882
- Jacobs, M. (2016). Panic at the pump: The energy crisis and the transformation of American politics in the 1970s. Hill and Wang.
- Kalman, L. (2010). Right star rising: A new politics, 1974–1980. W. W. Norton.
- Patterson, J. T. (2005). Restless giant: The United States from Watergate to Bush v. Gore. Oxford University Press.
- Perlstein, R. (2014). The invisible bridge: The fall of Nixon and the rise of Reagan. Simon & Schuster.
- Rodgers, D. T. (2011). Age of fracture. Harvard University Press. doi:10.4159/9780674059528
- Schulman, B. J. (2001). The seventies: The great shift in American culture, society, and politics. Free Press.
- Stein, J. (2010). Pivotal decade: How the United States traded factories for finance in the seventies. Yale University Press. doi:10.12987/9780300163292

== Historiography ==
- Kaufman, S. (Ed.). (2015). A companion to Gerald R. Ford and Jimmy Carter. Wiley-Blackwell. doi:10.1002/9781118907634
- Rottinghaus, B., Eady, G., & Vaughn, J. S. (2020). Presidential greatness in a polarized era: Results from the latest Presidential Greatness Survey. PS: Political Science & Politics, 53(3), 413–420. doi:10.1017/s1049096520000177

== Primary sources ==
- Casserly, J. J. (1977). The Ford White House: The diary of a speechwriter. Colorado Associated University Press.
- Ford, B., & Chase, C. (1978). The times of my life. Harper & Row.
- Ford, B., & Chase, C. (1987). Betty: A glad awakening. Doubleday.
- Ford, G. R., & Stiles, J. R. (1965). Portrait of the assassin. Simon and Schuster.
- Ford, G. R. (1979). A time to heal: The autobiography of Gerald R. Ford. Harper & Row.
- Hartmann, R. T. (1980). Palace politics: An inside account of the Ford years. McGraw-Hill.
- Kissinger, H. (1999). Years of renewal. Simon & Schuster.
- Nessen, R. (1978). It sure looks different from the inside. Playboy Press.
- Weidenfeld, S. R. (1979). First lady's lady: With the Fords at the White House. Putnam.

== See also ==
- 1975 New York City fiscal crisis
- 1976 United States presidential election
- Attempted assassination of Gerald Ford
- Church Committee
- Fall of Saigon
- Gerald R. Ford Presidential Museum
- Hazelden Betty Ford Foundation
- Helsinki Accords
- Mayaguez incident
- Pardon of Richard Nixon
- Rockefeller Commission
- Vladivostok Summit Meeting on Arms Control
