= Oliver Sipple =

American Marine veteran (1941–1989)

- Born: Oliver Wellington Sipple; November 20, 1941; Detroit, Michigan, U.S.
- Died: c. January 1989 (aged 47) (Note: Sipple was found dead on February 2, 1989, and this is the date recorded on his tombstone. However, officials estimated that he had been dead for several days before February 2.); San Francisco, California, U.S.
- Burial place: Golden Gate National Cemetery
- Military career
- Allegiance: United States of America
- Branch: United States Marine Corps
- Rank: PFC

Oliver Wellington "Billy" Sipple (November 20, 1941 – c. January 1989) was an American man known for intervening to foil an assassination attempt against U.S. President Gerald Ford on September 22, 1975. A decorated U.S. Marine and disabled Vietnam War veteran, he grappled with Sara Jane Moore as she fired a pistol at Ford in San Francisco, causing her to miss.

== Early life ==
Sipple was born in Detroit, Michigan. He served in the United States Marine Corps and fought in Vietnam. Shrapnel wounds suffered in December 1968 caused him to finish out his second tour of duty in a Philadelphia veterans' hospital, from which he was released in March 1970. Sipple, who was closeted in his hometown of Detroit, had met Harvey Milk in New York City and had participated in San Francisco's gay pride parades and gay rights demonstrations. Sipple was active in local causes, including the historic political campaigns of openly gay Board of Supervisors candidate Milk. The two were friends, and Sipple would later be described as a "prominent figure" in the gay community who had worked in a gay bar and was active in the Imperial Court System.

He lived with a merchant seaman in a fourth-floor walk-up apartment located in San Francisco's Mission District. He later spent six months in San Francisco's VA hospital, and was frequently readmitted into the hospital in 1975, the year he saved Ford's life.

== Ford assassination attempt ==
On September 22, 1975, Sipple was part of a crowd of about 3,000 people who had gathered outside San Francisco's St. Francis Hotel to see President Ford. Standing beside Sipple, about 40 feet (12 meters) from Ford, was Sara Jane Moore. When Moore shot at Ford with a .38 revolver, narrowly missing Ford, Sipple dove towards her and grabbed her arm; the gun fired again, striking a bystander.

Initial news reports noted that Sipple was a former Marine, but did not mention that he was gay. Though he was known within the San Francisco gay community, and had participated in gay pride events, he had kept his sexual orientation secret from his family and employer; he asked the press to keep his homosexuality off the record.

The day after the incident, San Francisco Chronicle columnist Herb Caen received two phone messages identifying Sipple as gay. One was from Reverend Ray Broshears, the head of a gay activist group called the Lavender Panthers. The other was from local gay activist Harvey Milk, a friend of Sipple on whose city council campaign Sipple had worked. Milk wanted to portray Sipple as a "gay hero" to help "break the stereotype of homosexuals [as] timid, weak and unheroic figures"; he told a friend, "It's too good an opportunity. For once we can show that gays do heroic things, not just all that caca about molesting children and hanging out in bathrooms." According to historian Harold Evans, "[T]here was no invitation to the White House for Sipple, not even a commendation. Milk made a fuss about that." Three days after the incident, Sipple received a letter from President Ford. It read:

I want you to know how much I appreciated your selfless actions last Monday. The events were a shock to us all, but you acted quickly and without fear for your own safety. By doing so, you helped to avert danger to me and to others in the crowd. You have my heartfelt appreciation.

Two days after the thwarted assassination attempt, unable to reach Sipple, Caen wrote of Sipple as a gay man and a friend of Harvey Milk, speculating Ford offered praise "quietly" because of Sipple's sexual orientation. Sipple was besieged by reporters, as was his family. His mother refused to speak to him. Gay liberation groups petitioned local media to give Sipple his due as a hero. Caen published the private side of Sipple's story, as did a handful of other publications. Sipple then insisted to reporters that his sexuality be kept confidential. Reporters labeled Sipple the "gay ex-Marine", and his mother disparaged and disowned him. Later, when Sipple hid in a friend's apartment to avoid reporters, they turned to Milk, arguably the most visible voice for the gay community. Of President Ford's letter of thanks to Sipple, Milk suggested that Sipple's sexual orientation was the reason he received only a note, rather than an invitation to the White House.

Sipple sued the Chronicle, filing a $15-million invasion of privacy suit against Caen, seven named newspapers, and a number of unnamed publishers. In 1984, a state court of appeals held that Sipple had indeed become news, and that his sexual orientation was part of the story.

== Later years and death ==
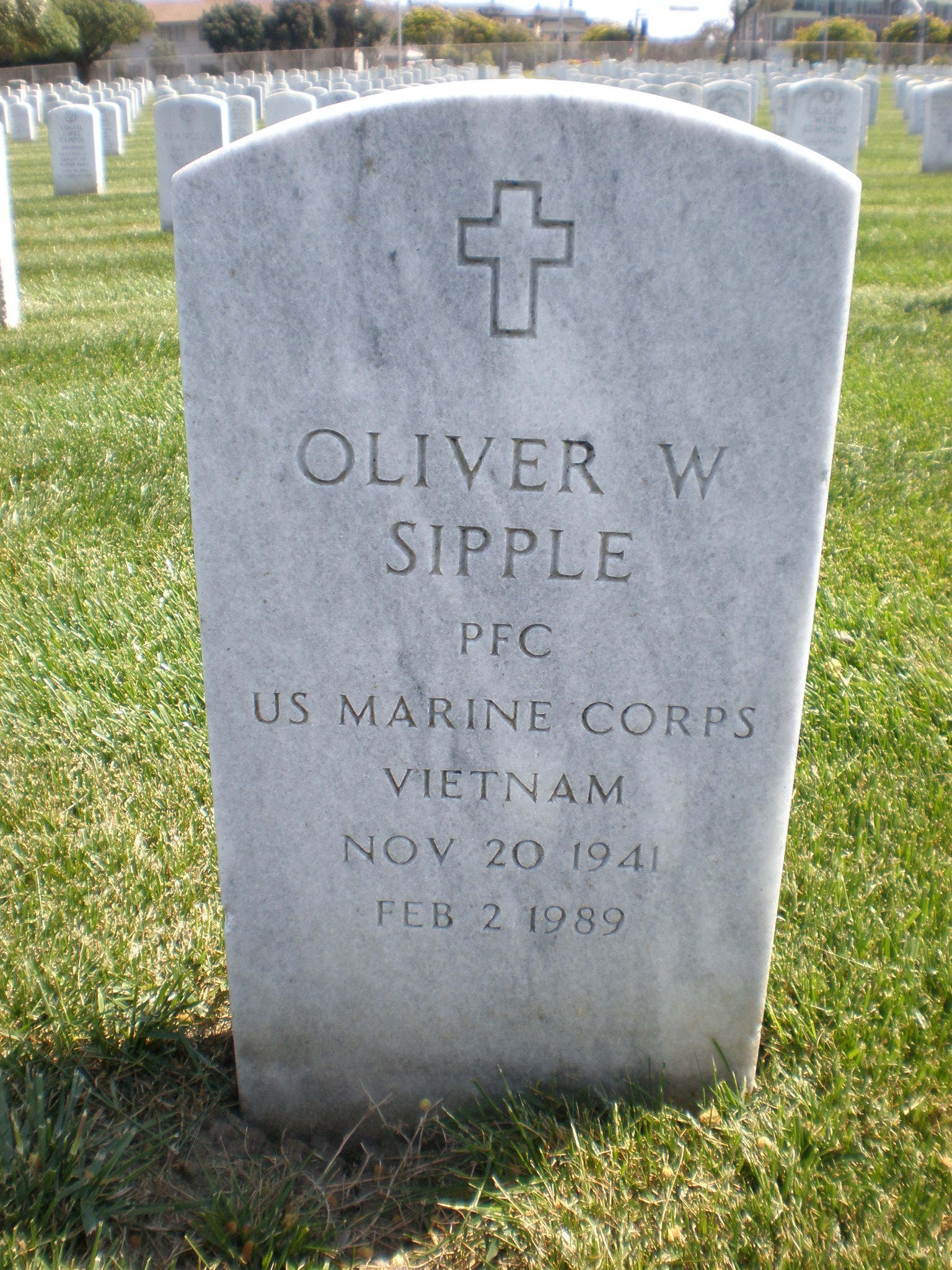
Sipple's headstone at Golden Gate National Cemetery

According to a 2006 article in The Washington Post, Sipple went through a period of estrangement with his parents, but the family later reconciled with him. Sipple's brother, George, told the newspaper, "[Our parents] accepted it. That was all. They didn't like it, but they still accepted. He was welcomed. Only thing was: Don't bring a lot of your friends." However, other sources indicate that Sipple's parents never fully accepted him. His mother, just after news broke of Sipple's sexual orientation, hung up on Sipple, saying she never wished to speak to him again. His father is said to have told Sipple's brother to "forget [he had] a brother." Finally, when his mother died, his father did not allow him to attend her funeral.

Sipple's mental and physical health sharply declined over the years. He began to drink heavily, was diagnosed with schizophrenia and fitted with a pacemaker, and gained weight. He sometimes expressed regret about grabbing Moore's gun because of the publicity it had brought him. On February 2, 1989, an acquaintance, Wayne Friday, found Sipple dead in his San Francisco apartment, with a bottle of Jack Daniel's next to him and the television still on. The San Francisco coroner ascribed his death to natural causes, and estimated Sipple had been dead for approximately 10 days. He was 47 years old. Ford and his wife sent a letter of sympathy to Sipple's family and friends. He was buried in Golden Gate National Cemetery south of San Francisco.

In a 2001 interview with columnist Deb Price, Ford disputed the claim that he had treated Sipple differently because of his sexual orientation, saying,

As far as I was concerned, I had done the right thing and the matter was ended. I didn't learn until sometime later – I can't remember when – he was gay. I don't know where anyone got the crazy idea I was prejudiced and wanted to exclude gays.

Issues arising from the press's reporting of Sipple's private life are referred to in the motion picture Absence of Malice and in an episode of L.A. Law. A number of law review articles, books, and commentary pieces have discussed "the perplexing ethical dimensions of the case".

== In popular culture ==
Oliver Sipple's story was shared in a 2017 episode of the WNYC radio program Radiolab. The program aired in syndication on National Public Radio.

== See also ==
- List of United States presidential assassination attempts and plots
