= The Fall of Otrar =

1991 film

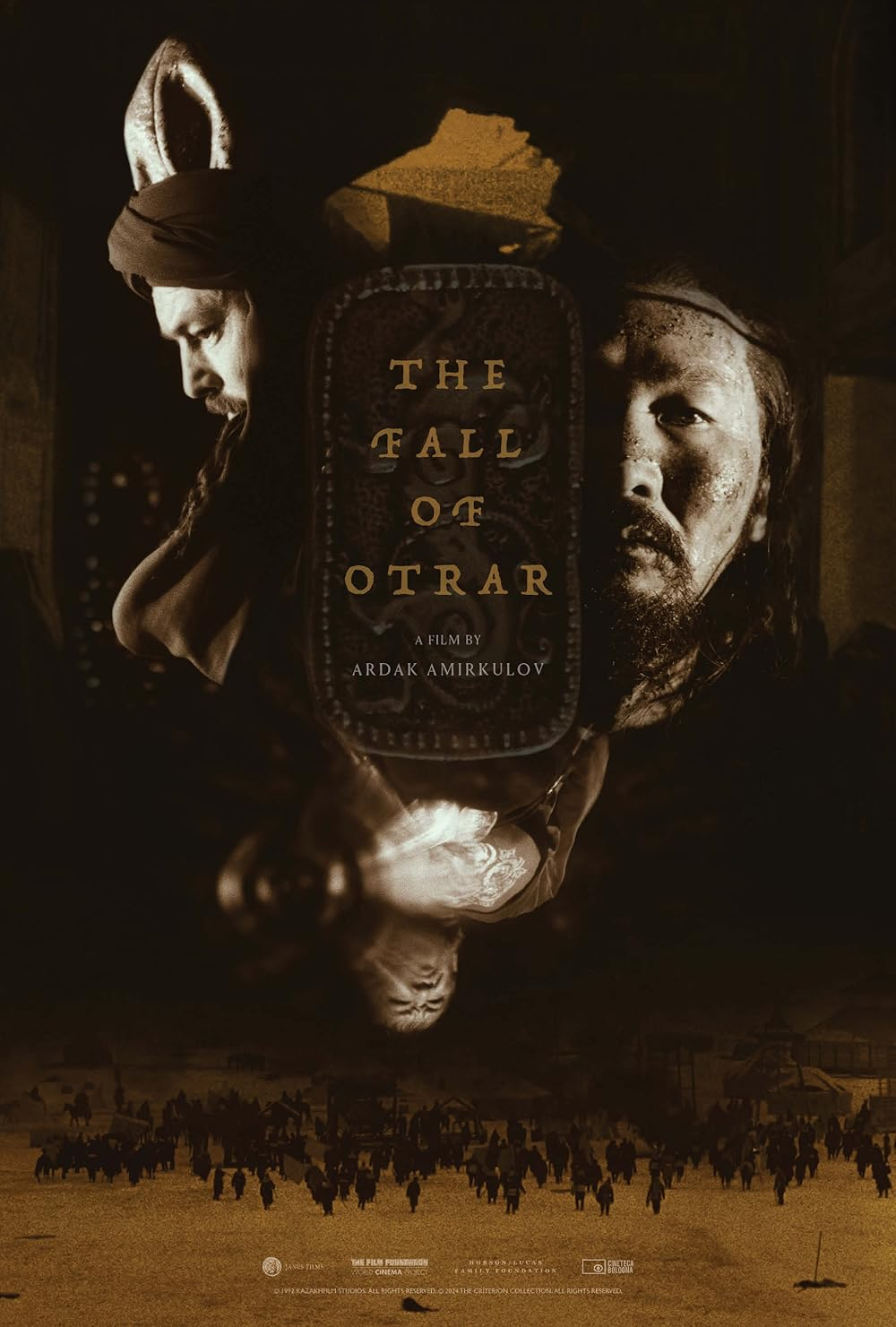
- 4K restoration release poster
- Directed by: Ardak Amirkulov
- Written by: Aleksei German; Svetlana Karmalita; Ardak Amirkulov
- Produced by: Aleksei German
- Starring: Dokhdurbek Kydyraliyev; Tungyshbai Dzhamankulov
- Cinematography: Sapar Koichumanov; Aubakir Suleyev
- Edited by: Aiman Kistauova (as G. Qystauova)
- Music by: Kuat Shildebayev
- Production companies: Kazakhfilm; ARDFILM; Alem
- Release date: 1991
- Running time: 157 minutes
- Country: Soviet Union
- Languages: Kazakh; Russian; Mandarin; Mongolian
- Box office: $7,159

The Fall of Otrar (Kazakh: Отырардың күйреуі, Otyrardyñ küirewi) is a 1991 Soviet-era Kazakhstani epic historical drama film directed by Ardak Amirkulov. The film was selected as the Kazakhstani entry for the Best Foreign Language Film at the 65th Academy Awards, but was not accepted as a nominee.

Ardak Amirkulov's feature film debut after his student film, Tactical War Game on Rough Terrain, The Fall of Otrar originally released in the Soviet Union in 1991 and was later granted a limited, international re-release in 2002. It was not until almost 22 years later that it would re-release again, premiering a 4K restoration at the 62nd New York Film Festival.

== Production ==
Production began in 1987 and shooting took place exclusively on location in Kazakhstan. The production was both laborious and troublesome, and there were multiple times throughout production where the crew was unsure if the film would actually be finished. The set for the city of Otrar, destroyed twice by the elements, had to be built three times. In addition, as in all the Soviet republics, the Kazakh film industry was nationalized. During the Gorbachev era, when a stagnant economy was restructured, there were scant resources to mount a lavish historical epic. Salaries for the cast and crew were regularly halted as the production was put on hold for long stretches. Short of funds, the film was at one point even removed from the official release schedule of Kazakhfilm.

When the Soviet Union began to disintegrate, the budget dried up completely. No bank would invest in a production that belonged to a state institution and that would seemingly be the final nail in the coffin for The Fall of Otrar. Boldly, Amirkulov obtained a loan to purchase the film from the government, but this meant that everything he earned from distribution went toward recouping his investment. After 4 years of work stoppages, set destruction, and an entire nation being dissolved, The Fall of Otrar finally released in 1991.

== Premise ==
A staggering historical epic about the intrigue and turmoil of the Central Asian civilization of Otrar, before its systematic destruction at the hands of Genghis Khan.

== Cast ==
- Dokhdurbek Kydyraliyev as Undzhu
- Tungyshbai Dzhamankulov as Kaiyrkhan (Inalchuq)
- Bolot Beyshenaliyev as Shinvyskhan (Genghis Khan)
- Abdurashid Makhsudov as Mukhamedshakh (Muhammad II of Khwarazm)
- Kasym Zhakibayev as Old Man
- Zaur Zekhov as Yalbach
- Sabira Atayeva as Terken Khatun
- Kasym Zhakibayev as Dinnen Bezeyen
- Pyotr Morozov as Slave

== Restoration ==
A 4K digital restoration of the film by The Film Foundation’s World Cinema Project and Cineteca di Bologna at L’Immagine Ritrovata laboratory was completed in 2024, with the collaboration of director Ardak Amirkulov. First premiering at the 62nd New York Film Festival, the restoration was soon further released in theaters in the United States by Janus Films. It is set to make its American home video debut in 2026 as part of the Martin Scorsese's World Cinema Project No. 5 Blu-ray box set, released by The Criterion Collection.

== Reception ==
=== Box office ===
No box office data is available for its initial 1991 release; it is believed, however, that Ardak was able to recuperate the costs associated with purchasing the film from the government after the film's initial domestic release.

For its 2025 U.S. re-release with its new 4K restoration, The Fall of Otrar grossed $7,159, including $3,652 during its opening weekend (August 1st–3rd).

=== Critical response ===
Much like the box office data, contemporary reviews from its 1991 release are not available. However, both later and modern day reviews rate The Fall of Otrar generally positively. The Social cataloging application, Letterboxd, rates The Fall of Otrar at 3.9 out of 5 stars, based on over 200 user reviews.

Dave Kehr, writing for the NY Times in 2002, called The Fall of Otrar a "strange and fascinating historical epic that is both compelling, thought-provoking and cynical and cruel".

== See also ==
- List of submissions to the 65th Academy Awards for Best Foreign Language Film
- List of Kazakhstani submissions for the Academy Award for Best Foreign Language Film
