= Attempted assassination of Gerald Ford in San Francisco =

1975 assassination attempt in California, U.S.

Gerald Ford assassination attempt in San Francisco
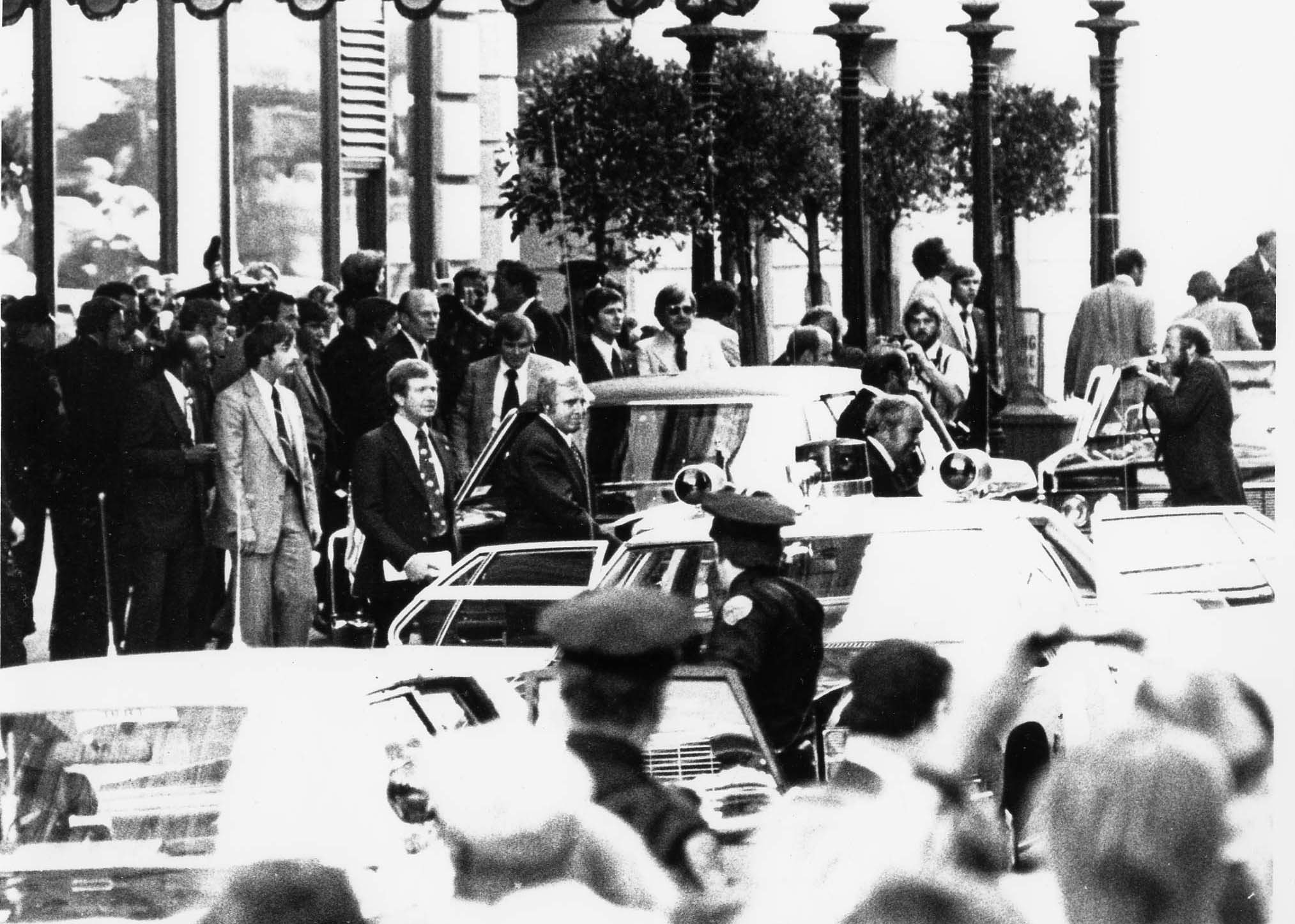
- Photograph taken one second after the assassination attempt. From this vantage point, Ford is standing directly behind the man wearing the spotted necktie.
- Location: 37.7883°N 122.4087°W; On Post Street in front of St. Francis Hotel in San Francisco, California, U.S.
- Date: September 22, 1975; 51 years ago 3:30 p.m. (PDT)
- Target: Gerald Ford, 38th President of the United States
- Attack type: Attempted assassination by gunshot
- Weapon: .38 Special revolver
- Deaths: None
- Injuries: John Ludwig
- Perpetrator: Sara Jane Moore
- Defenders: Oliver Sipple, Timothy Hettrich, San Francisco Police Department, United States Secret Service

In San Francisco on September 22, 1975, Sara Jane Moore attempted to assassinate the 38th president of the United States, Gerald Ford, after he had made an address to the World Affairs Council. Moore tried to shoot President Ford with a .38 Special revolver. Her single shot missed, and a bystander prevented another shot by grabbing her shooting arm. Ford had survived a previous assassination attempt 17 days earlier; after this second attempt, he wore a bulletproof trench coat while out in public. On January 15, 1976, Moore was sentenced to life in prison for the attempt, and was released on parole on December 31, 2007.

== Background ==
Sara Jane Moore had been evaluated by the Secret Service earlier in 1975, but agents had concluded that she posed no danger to the president. The 45-year-old was detained by police on an illegal handgun charge the day before the assassination attempt, but was released. The police confiscated her .44-caliber Charter Arms Bulldog revolver and 113 rounds of ammunition.

== Shooting ==
On Monday afternoon at 3:30 p.m., after speaking to the World Affairs Council, Ford emerged from the Post Street (north) entrance of the St. Francis Hotel in Union Square, then walked toward his limousine. Before boarding the vehicle, he stopped and waved to the crowd that had gathered across the street.

Sara Jane Moore was standing in the crowd about forty feet (12 m) away from Ford when she fired one shot with her .38 Special revolver. The shot missed Ford's head by five inches (13 cm) and passed through the wall above the doorway Ford had just walked out of. A bystander named Oliver Sipple heard the sound of the shot and dove at Moore, grabbing her shooting arm preventing her from pulling the trigger a second time. A bullet fragment from the shot superficially wounded John Ludwig, a 42-year-old taxi driver standing inside the hotel, in the groin. Moore had bought the gun in haste that same morning and its sights were inaccurate, which caused her to narrowly miss.

San Francisco Police Capt. Timothy Hettrich grabbed Moore and wrestled the gun from her hand. Many other officers immediately joined in subduing Moore. In the meantime, the president's Secret Service team pushed Ford into his waiting limousine where the Secret Service and Donald Rumsfeld lay on top of him. The limousine raced to San Francisco International Airport (SFO) where Ford boarded Air Force One and, after being joined by the first lady, flew back to Washington, D.C.

Moore explained in a 2009 interview that her motive was to spark a violent revolution in order to bring change to America.

== Aftermath ==
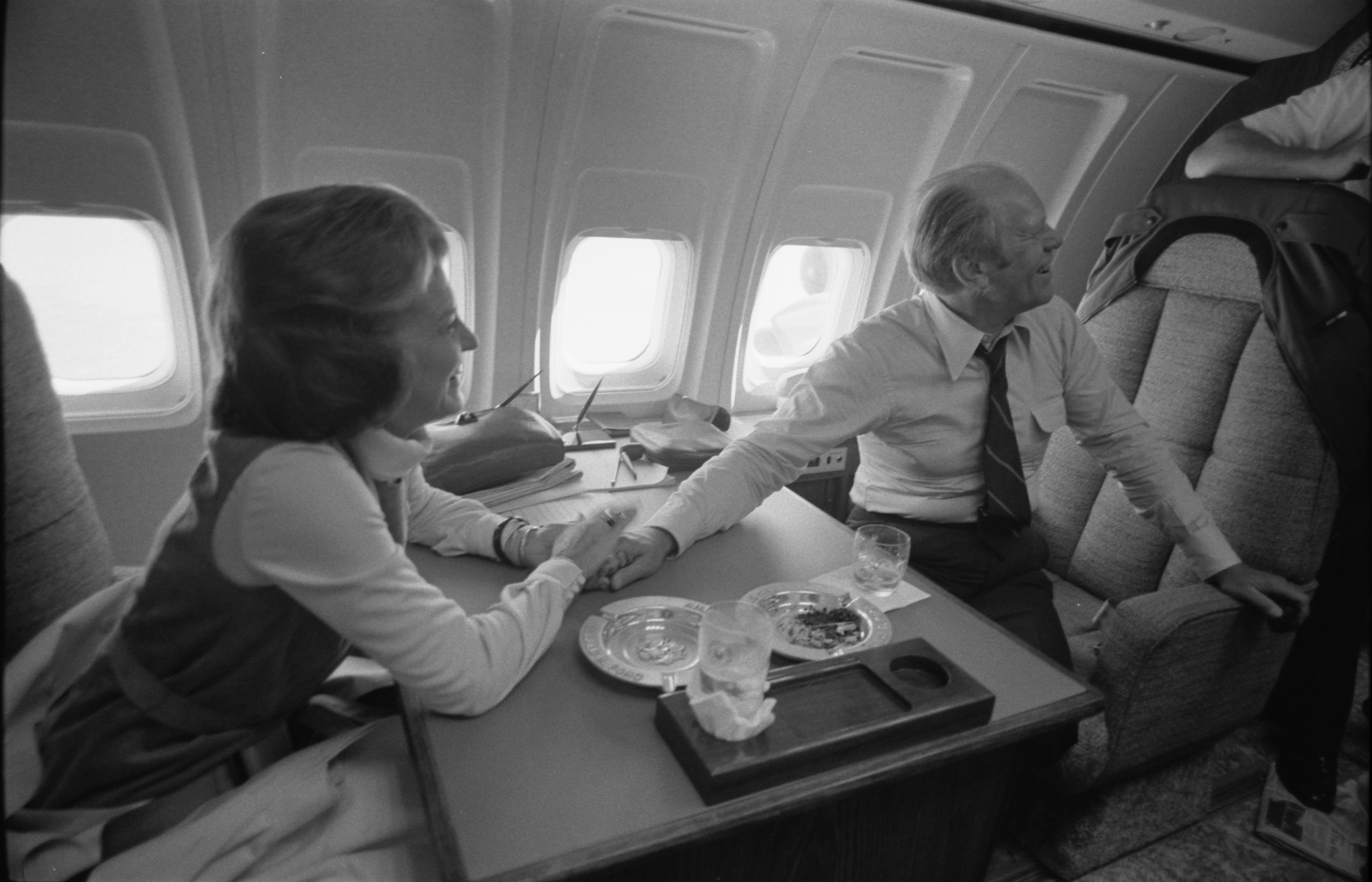
President Ford with his wife Betty aboard the return flight to Washington DC from San Francisco later on the same day as the assassination attempt

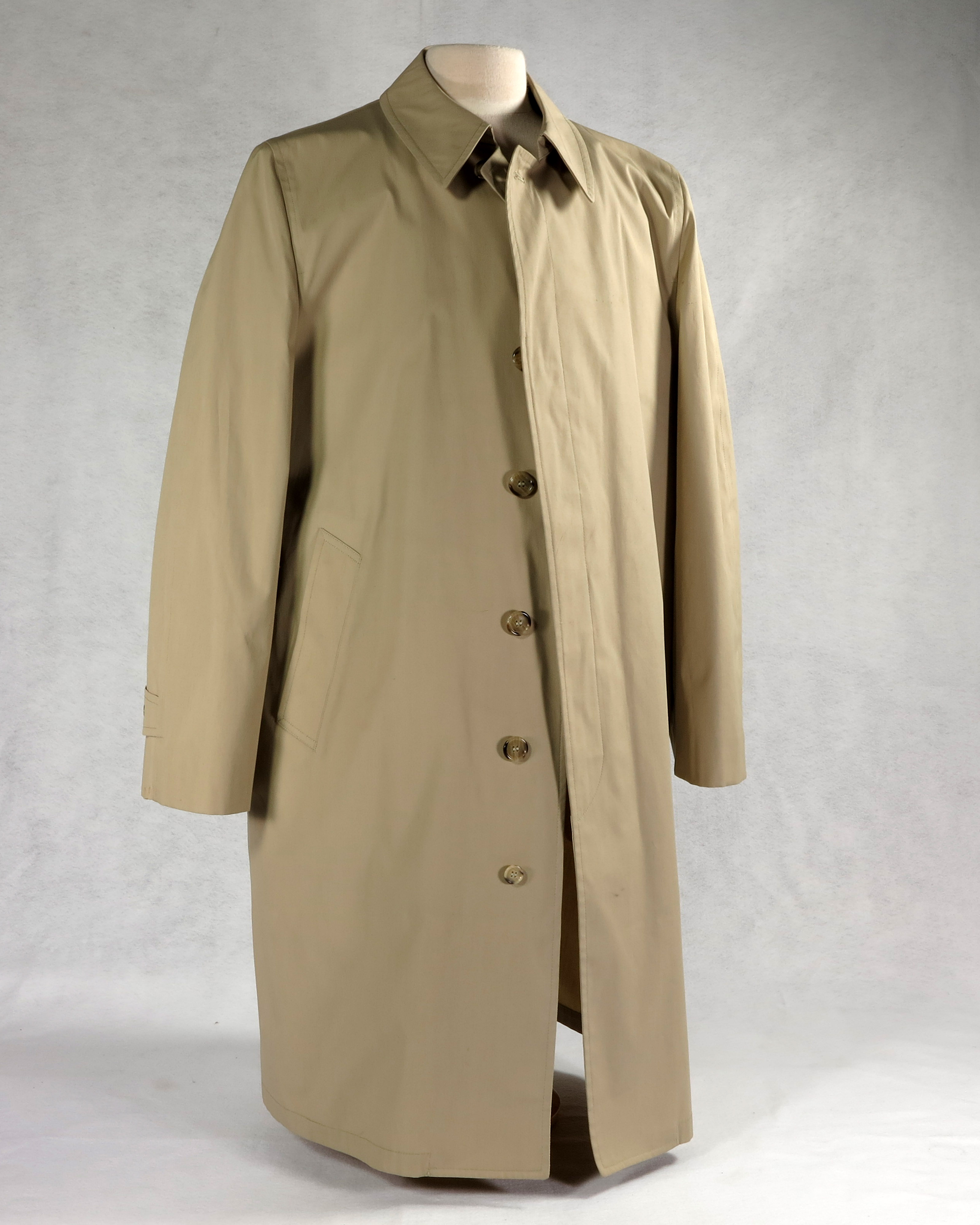
The bulletproof trenchcoat that Ford began wearing in public in October 1975 due to the two assassination attempts targeting him during the previous month

=== Sara Jane Moore ===
Moore pleaded guilty to charges of attempted assassination on December 12, 1975. The following month, on January 15, 1976, she was sentenced to life in prison. On December 31, 2007, at the age of 77, Moore was released on parole. She died on September 24, 2025.

=== Oliver Sipple ===
Oliver Sipple was commended at the scene by Secret Service and the San Francisco Police for his actions; the media portrayed him as a national hero. Three days after the assassination attempt in San Francisco, Sipple received a letter from President Ford praising him for his heroic actions.

All of the media publicity about him was not without controversy, however. Upon realizing that Sipple was gay, the media began broadcasting this information. That became the first time that Sipple's parents and family found out that Sipple was homosexual, as he had been hiding it from them. After learning about his sexual orientation, much of his family, including his parents, disowned him, and were subsequently estranged from him, but later were reconciled. Sipple died in 1989.

=== President Ford ===
After President Ford was rushed to the SFO tarmac in his limousine, he quickly boarded Air Force One. Before Ford could depart on his return trip to the nation's capital, however, the plane had to wait for his wife Betty, the first lady, who was carrying out her own schedule of events on the Peninsula.

In addition to the San Francisco incident, Ford had escaped unharmed from a previous assassination attempt in Sacramento, California, which occurred 17 days earlier on September 5, 1975. In response to the two occurrences in the same month, President Ford subsequently wore a bulletproof trench coat in public, beginning in October 1975.

Ford, who had succeeded to the presidency upon the resignation of Richard Nixon in 1974, ran for election in 1976. He lost to Jimmy Carter, by 297–240 in the electoral vote, and did not run for public office again. At age 93 in 2006, Ford died from natural causes.

== See also ==
- Bibliography of Gerald Ford
- List of United States presidential assassination attempts and plots
