= Paul Seban =

French film director (1929–2020)

- Born: 21 October 1929; Sidi Bel Abbès, French Algeria
- Died: 1 July 2020 (aged 90); Paris, France
- Occupation: Director

Paul Seban (21 October 1929 – 1 July 2020) was an Algerian-born French film director and journalist.

== Biography ==
After spending his childhood in Algeria, Seban arrived in Paris at age 19. After graduating university with a law degree, he enrolled in the Institut des hautes études cinématographiques (IDHEC), graduating in 1952.

On set of the 1954 film French Cancan, Seban met Jean Renoir and began his career as an assistant film director. He worked alongside numerous big names in the film industry, including Alexandre Astruc, Marcel Carné, Stanley Donen, and Orson Welles. Through the cinematic industry's difficulties in the 1950s, Seban also worked as an assistant director in television. During a 1961 interview for the program Lectures pour tous, he met Marguerite Duras. The pair worked on several short films for television and notably collaborated for the 1967 film La Musica, based on Duras' play of the same name.

Following La Musica, Seban devoted himself entirely to television. He also worked as a journalist, writing articles for Positif and Ligue de l'enseignement.

Seban filmed numerous political documentaries centering around anti-colonialism and communism. He worked for the French General Confederation of Labor and was a member of the French Communist Party from 1946 until his death.

Paul Seban died in Paris on 1 July 2020 at the age of 90.

== Filmography ==
=== Director ===
- 20,000 Leagues Across the Land (1961)
- Jean Cocteau répond à Roger Stéphane (1964)
- La Longue Nuit (1965)
- Marguerite Duras chez les fauves (1966)
- La Musica (1967)
- Ce jour-là (1967)
- Les amants d'Avignon (1975)
- Le mammouth (1975)
- Un jeune homme rebelle (1976)
- Cinéma 16 (1976)
- Le destin personnel (1979)
- Catherine (1981)
- Contes modernes: À propos du travail (1982)
- Cinéma 16 : Délit de fuite (1982)
- Pour Élisa (1983)
- Une péniche nommée Réalité (1985)
- Les mystérieux tueurs fous (1986)
- Traces de mai (1998)

=== Assistant director ===
- French Cancan (1955)
- Young Sinners (1958)
- One Life (1958)
- Demain en Nanguila (1960)
- Wise Guys (1961)
- The Trial (1962)
- Charade (1963)
