= Ardak Amirkulov =

Kazakh film director (1955–2026)

- Ардақ Әмірқұлов
- Born: Ardak Zhamansaryuly Amirkulov; 10 December 1955; Akkol, Kazakh SSR, Soviet Union
- Died: 5 August 2026 (aged 70)
- Education: Gerasimov Institute of Cinematography
- Occupation: Film director

Ardaq Jamansaryūly Ämırqūlov (Note: Often transliterated as Ardak Dzhamansarievich Amirkulov through a Russified Romanization of Ардак Джамансариевич Амиркулов.) (Kazakh: Ардақ Жамансарыұлы Әмірқұлов; 10 December 1955 – 5 August 2026) was a Kazakh film director.

A graduate of the Gerasimov Institute of Cinematography, he worked for Kazakhfilm. He also taught at the Kazakh National Academy of Arts.

Amirkulov died on 5 August 2026, at the age of 70.

== Filmography ==
- The Fall of Otrar (1991)
- Abai (1995)
- Farewell Gulsary (2008)
- The Land Where Winds Stood Still (2023)
