= New/Next Film Festival =

Film festival

- Location: Baltimore, Maryland, United States
- Founded: 2023
- Most recent: 2026
- Language: International
- Website: https://www.newnextfilmfest.com

New/Next Film Festival is an independent film festival based in Baltimore, Maryland founded in 2023.

In May 2023, it was announced that Baltimore radio station WYPR, in partnership with former Maryland Film Festival director of programming Eric Allen Hatch, would hold the New/Next Film Festival in August 2023, taking place at The Charles Theatre. The festival was planned as a reaction to the news that Maryland Film Festival was not holding a 2023 event.

The first New/Next Film Festival was held August 18–20 in Baltimore's Charles Theatre. The inaugural edition of New/Next presented over 20 feature films. Among the features screened was the world premiere of the documentary Carpet Cowboys, directed by Noah Collier and Emily MacKenzie and executive produced by John Wilson. The festival also screened over 50 short films, including the U.S. premiere of work by Lael Rogers and world premieres of work by Harrison Atkins, Albert Birney, Marly Hernandez Cortes and Stephen Schuyler, Danielle Criqui, Pisie Hochheim and Tony Oswald, and Gillian Waldo.

Special guests at the 2023 festival included the band Beach House, who introduced a favorite film, Lynne Ramsay's Morvern Callar; filmmaker Sam Pollard, who presented both Spike Lee's Bamboozled, which he edited, and the documentary Max Roach: The Drum Also Waltzes, which he co-directed; and Baltimore Mayor Brandon Scott, who participated in a Q+A following a screening of The Body Politic, a documentary following Scott's approach to curbing the murder rate in Baltimore. The festival's opening night party featured performances by Baltimore club artists Dapper Dan Midas and TT the Artist.

The festival announced in April 2024 that it would return for a second edition. The 2024 New/Next Film Festival took place October 3–6 with guests including Beach House, Conner O'Malley, Sam Pollard, Clara Mamet, Fantasy A, Alexi Wasser, The Ion Pack, Griffin Dunne, and members of Animal Collective. The festival offered the world premieres of the features Messy by Alexi Wasser, Softshell by Jinho Myung, Removal of the Eye by Prashanth Kamalakanthan and Artemis Shaw, as well as the U.S. festival premieres of The Dells by Nellie Kluz, The Code by Eugene Kotlyarenko, The Trick by Neal Wynne, and Physician, Heal Thyself by Asher Penn.

== List of features played at the festival ==
Year	Films
2023	Another Body; Bamboozled; The Body Politic; Carpet Cowboys; Dad & Step-Dad; De Lo Mio; Dogleg; The Gravity; Harka; Hummingbirds; King Coal; The Legend of MexMan; Life Begins, Life Ends; Max Roach: The Drum Also Waltzes; Milisuthando; Morvern Callar; Naked Gardens; No Fear, No Die; Peak Season; Rotting in the Sun; Somewhere Quiet; The Taste of Mango
2024	Babette's Feast presented by Beach House; Ben and Suzanne, A Reunion in 4 Parts; Black Art: In the Absence of Light presented by Sam Pollard; The Black Sea; The Code; Days of Happiness; The Dells; Doppelgängers³; Driver; Eephus; Eureka; Ex-Husbands; Familiar Touch; Fantasy A Gets a Mattress; The Featherweight; Gazer; Guián; The Hobby; Homegrown; The Human Surge 3; Jetty; Jimmy; A Man Imagined; Messy; Physician, Heal Thyself; Rap World; Rats!; Realm of Satan; Removal of the Eye; Softshell; Soundtrack to a Coup d'Etat; Style Wars; The Trick; Underground Orange; Vulcanizadora; Your Final Meditation
2025	Abiding Nowhere; Alice-Heart; American Theater; Andre Is an Idiot; Anything That Moves; Characters Disappearing; Commando presented by Stavros Halkias; Dance Freak; Danny Is My Boyfriend; Dead Lover; In Excess; In the Glow of Darkness; In the Mouth; Lockjaw; Lowndes County and the Road to Black Power presented by Sam Pollard; Man with a Movie Camera (2025); Natchez; Night Stage; OBEX; $Positions; Possum Town; The Python Hunt; Reveries: The Mind Prison; Room Temperature; The Scout; Seeds; Serious People; Snake Oil Song; To the West, in Zapata; To Use a Mountain; The Travel Companion; Tripoli/A Tale of Three Cities; The True Beauty of Being Bitten by a Tick; WTO/99
