= Fantasy A Gets a Mattress =

- Theatrical release poster
- Directed by: Noah Zoltan Sofian; David Norman Lewis
- Written by: Noah Zoltan Sofian; David Norman Lewis
- Produced by: Safiye Rose Senturk; Noah Zoltan Sofian; David Norman Lewis
- Starring: Fantasy A Acacia Porter; Logic Amen; Aaron Billingsly; Ready Ron; Keosha Lovely Fredricks; Miles Stanberry
- Cinematography: Noah Zoltan Sofian; Ryan Cutuli
- Edited by: Noah Zoltan Sofian; David Norman Lewis
- Release date: 2023
- Running time: 79 minutes
- Country: United States
- Language: English

Fantasy A Gets a Mattress is a 2023 American independent comedy film written and directed by Noah Zoltan Sofian and David Norman Lewis and produced by Sofian, Lewis, and Safiye Rose Senturk. The film stars Fantasy A and is based loosely on his life and sections of his memoir, Life in the Eyes of an Autistic Person.

== Plot ==
After coming home past curfew, Fantasy A gets kicked out of his group home for disabled adults. While searching for a new place to sleep, Fantasy A interacts with an ensemble cast of characters as he simultaneously seeks superstardom.

== Cast ==
- Fantasy A as Himself
- Acacia Porter as Asia Rose
- Logic Amen as Ramon
- Aaron Billingsly as Zander
- Ready Ron as Ed Jones
- Keosha Lovely Fredricks as Lil Rude Puss
- Chris Zapata as Glenn
- Miles Stanberry as Male Model
- Osato Cooley as Osato
- Elizabeth Navarro as Annabelle
- DoNormaal as Crystal
- Louis Wilson as Louis the Bartender
- Charles McKinney as Scabby
- Tony Beck as Grady
- Margaret Channon as Canvasser
- Karen Wetterhahn as White Lady

== Production ==
Fantasy A Gets a Mattress was filmed in numerous locations throughout Seattle. The filmmakers and most of the cast and crew members involved are also from Seattle. The core production team and Fantasy A all attended the same high school in Seattle.

== Release and reception ==
=== Festivals ===
Fantasy A Gets a Mattress was selected to screen at the following film festivals:

- 2023 Seattle Black Film Festival
- 2023 Northwest Folklife Festival
- 2023 Seattle Film Summit
- 2023 Northwest Film Forum Local Sightings Film Festival
- 2023 Silent City Film Festival
- 2023 Tacoma Film Festival
- 2023 Poulsbo Film Festival
- 2023 TASH Film Festival
- 2024 Nosebleeds Film Festival
- 2024 Spokane International Film Festival
- 2024 Oska Bright Film Festival
- 2024 Capital City Film Festival
- 2024 Oak Cliff Film Festival
- 2024 New/Next Film Festival
- 2024 Bainbridge Island Film Festival
- 2025 Central Coast Film Festival

=== Critical response ===
In Chase Hutchinson's review for The Seattle Times, he wrote, "the history of Seattle film has a new chapter that, while still being written, begins and ends with Fantasy A." Natalia Mesa, writing for High Country News, stated, "The interstitial back alleys, dark clubs, industrial zones and skate parks not only serve as low-budget locales, they also expose Seattle’s underbelly, which is rarely captured on film."

Brendan Kiley, reviewing the film for The Seattle Times's Pacific NW Magazine, wrote, “There is a part of us it wakes up—a part we’ve been yearning to have awoken.” Writing for The Stranger, culture critic Charles Mudede compared the film to Boots Riley's Sorry to Bother You, stating, "What do these works show? How surreal it is to live in a world where what is most unreal (poverty) has the most reality."

=== Accolades ===
Awards and nominations for Fantasy A Gets a Mattress
Award	Year	Category	Nominee	Result	Ref.
Seattle Black Film Festival Jury Awards	2023	Best Feature	Fantasy A Gets a Mattress	Won	
Berlin Indie Film Festival Jury Awards	2023	Best Cinematography	Fantasy A Gets a Mattress	Won	
Local Sightings Film Festival Jury Awards	2023	Best Feature	Fantasy A Gets a Mattress	Won	
Tacoma Film Festival Jury Awards	2023	Best PNW Narrative Feature	Fantasy A Gets a Mattress	Won	
Silent City Film Festival Jury Awards	2023	Best Comedic Feature	Fantasy A Gets a Mattress	Won	
Seattle Film Critics Society Jury Awards	2023	Achievement in Pacific Northwest Filmmaking	Fantasy A Gets a Mattress	Nominated	
Spokane International Film Festival Jury Awards	2024	Most Promising Filmmaker	Fantasy A Gets a Mattress	Won	
