= Nick DiMartino =

Seattle-based author, playwright, book reviewer and bookseller

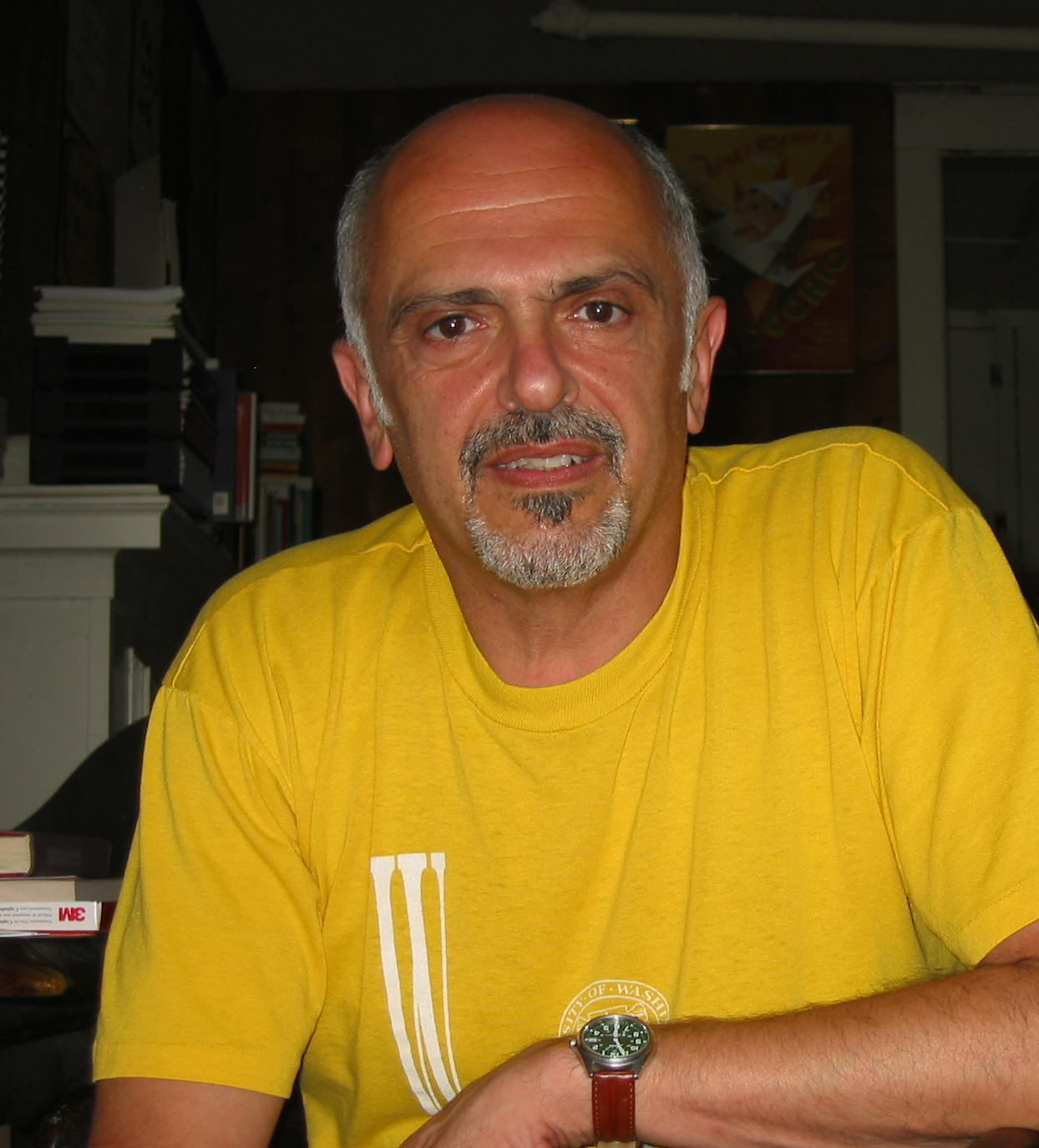
- DiMartino in 2005
- Born: November 11, 1946 (age 79); Long Beach, California, U.S.
- Education: University of Washington
- Occupations: Author, playwright, reviewer, bookseller
- Writing career
- Genres: Supernatural fiction, Fantasy, Young adult fiction, Ghost story, historical fiction

Nick Joseph DiMartino (born November 11, 1946) is a Seattle-based author, playwright, book reviewer and bookseller. To date he has published 15 novels, 2 non-fiction books and has had over 20 plays in full production. Many of his books feature local characters and settings. His plays are often treatments of classic books.

== History ==
DiMartino was born in Long Beach, California to Ernesto DiMartino (1922–2012), a second-generation Seattle fruit-and-vegetable merchant and later realtor, and Mamie Lombard DiMartino (1924–2019). Little Nick was named for his grandfather Nicola, but these days the Italian form of the name is usually feminine, so his parents baptized him just Nick (not Nicola or Nicholas). When Nick was six months old the family moved back to Seattle to stay. He attended Maple Elementary School, Cleveland High School, and the University of Washington where he majored in English Literature. After graduating from U.W. in 1969, he attended one semester of graduate school on a full scholarship at Johns Hopkins University before returning to Seattle and going to work at University Book Store, where he became a book buyer. He has used this position to make sure classic books always remain on the shelves, despite the higher profit margins of Washington Huskies sports clothing.

From his first published work, a one-act play called The Polar Bear (which won Scholastic Magazine's First Prize when he was just 18), Nick has completed 55 books and authored over 24 plays.

His play Frankenstein has been performed by the Honolulu Theatre for Youth, First Stage Children's Theater in Milwaukee, Dallas Children's Theater, twice at Nashville Children's Theatre and twice at Louisville's Stage One, where it was videotaped in 1997 by the BBC and released as a family theatre video by Globalstage to great reviews.

=== Nick's Picks ===
In 2001 DiMartino began a 'book-of-the-month' feature at the seven branches of University Book Store, creating signage and promotion for the best newly released international title. Since then his 'Picks' have been prominently featured every month for over fourteen years.

=== Nick's Book Club ===
In 2003 the Nick's Pick promotion expanded into a discussion group at UBS for each featured book, which has met for over twelve years now. When The Kite Runner was chosen in 2003, his club members attended the first Seattle autograph party for its author Khaled Hosseini. Other authors who have visited Nick's Book Club include Marjane Satrapi, Rory Stewart, and Alison Bechdel.

=== Shelf Awareness ===
Starting in June 2007 DiMartino has reviewed international fiction for Shelf-Awareness.com, the daily online newszine for booksellers and book-lovers. To date Shelf Awareness has published over 250 of his reviews.

=== Booklist ===
Between 2007 and 2009 Nick contributed 126 articles to the online Booklist Reader from Booklist Publications.

=== Seattle Gay and Lesbian Book Club ===
In January 2009 DiMartino founded The Seattle Gay & Lesbian Book Club, which meets weekly to discuss each month's featured current or classic novel (or memoir) relating to life as a gay person.

== Works ==
=== Fiction ===
- 1973 Eye of the Dragon
- 1974 The Other Side of the Bay – published in ‘’Shadows and Silence’’, Ashtray Press, 2000
- 1975 Marco
- 1976 Purgatorio
- 1976 New World Symphony
- 1977 Barnaby Rune and the Gargoyles
- 1978 The Shoemaker and the Elves
- 1980 Madeline Usher
- 1985 Snark!
- 1986 Joseph Golem
- 1986 Sindbad
- 1987 Golden Ass
- 1987 The Red Forest – Pacific Northwest Writers’ Conference – 2nd Prize
- 1988 The Seattle Exchange
- 1989 Sand-Clock Boy
- 1989 Gilgamesh
- 1990 The Ugly Duckling
- 1990 Lord of the Squirrels
- 1990 Dead Tourist: Unidentified
- 1991 Bridge of Black Glass
- 1992 Were
- 1993 Diet
- 1993 Student Union
- 1993 A Mall and the Night Visitor
- 1994 Red
- 1994 Bookworm
- 1995 Eternal Light
- 1995 Hot Glue — The Day Seattle Burned
- 1996 Christmas Ghost Story, Seattle: Rosebriar Press, 1996, ISBN 0-9653918-0-9
- 1997 University Ghost Story, Seattle: Rosebriar Press, 1997, ISBN 0-9653918-1-7
- 1998 Seattle Ghost Story, Seattle: Rosebriar Press, 1998, ISBN 0-9653918-2-5
- 1998 The Ravine: A Seattle Ghost Story (audiobook)
- 1999 Personals
- 2000 The Fence
- 2000 Shameless
- 2001 Out Of Control
- 2001 Straight
- 2002 Turn Away From The Sun
- 2003 Family Wrecking
- 2004 Pineapple Moon
- 2005 Love in the American Empire
- 2009 How To Be Positive
- 2010 That Human Weakness
- 2011 Hell Has a Bookstore, Seattle: University Book Store Press
- 2011 Dude, Seattle: University Book Store Press, November 29, 2011, ISBN 978-1-937358-06-8
- 2012 Changes: In A Little Gay Bar, Seattle: University Book Store Press, August 28, 2012, ISBN 978-1-937358-18-1
- 2012 Pineapple Moon, Seattle: University Book Store Press, August 21, 2012, ISBN 978-1-937358-17-4
- 2012 Love in the American Empire, Seattle: University Book Store Press
- 2013 Joseph Golem, Seattle: University Book Store Press, August 6, 2013, ISBN 978-1-937358-32-7
- 2013 The Devil in Love, Seattle: University Book Store Press
- 2013 Women Who Can't Stop Talking, Seattle: University Book Store Press, November 13, 2013, ISBN 978-1-937358-35-8
- 2014 Student Union, Seattle: University Book Store Press, March 28, 2014, ISBN 978-1-937358-43-3
- 2014 The Golden Handcuffs, Seattle: University Book Store Press, September 23, 2014, ISBN 978-1-937358-54-9
- 2015 Alleluiah Heights, Seattle: University Book Store Press, October 2014, ISBN 978-1-937358-65-5
- 2015 Aurora In Love, Seattle: University Book Store Press, September 23, 2015, ISBN 978-1-937358-68-6
- 2015 The Professor's Wife, Seattle: University Book Store Press, November 17, 2015, ISBN 978-1-937358-71-6

=== Non-Fiction ===
- 2012 Throw Me Among My Own: The Story of the Rosella Family, Seattle: University Book Store Press, July 20, 2012, ISBN 978-1-937358-15-0
- 2012 Mars Versus Maple School, Seattle: University Book Store Press, September 4, 2012, ISBN 978-1-937358-14-3

=== Plays ===
- The Polar Bear (1965) - Scholastic Magazine First Prize
- Treasure Island (1974) - Seattle Junior Programs
- Raven (1975) – Red Earth Performing Arts Company
- Atlante (1976) – Red Earth Performing Arts Company
- Dracula (1982) – Seattle Children's Theatre
- Alice in Wonderland (1982) – Bellevue Children's Theatre
- Families: A Musical (1983) – Seattle Children's Theatre
- Pinocchio (1983) – Seattle Children's Theatre
- Frankenstein (1983) – Honolulu Theatre for Youth
- Ozma of Oz (1983) – Bellevue Children's Theatre
- Rama (1984) – Bellevue Children's Theatre
- The Snow Queen (1984) – Seattle Children's Theatre
- Raven The Hungry (1984) – Honolulu Theatre for Youth
- The Wizard of Oz (1988) – Village Theatre, Issaquah
- Stop The Wedding! (1988) – New City Theatre Playwrights Festival finalist, 1999 Hugo House Playwriting Competition finalist
- Snow White (1989) – Pittsburgh Playhouse Junior
- Aladdin (1990) – Pittsburgh Playhouse Junior
- Closed Door (1990)
- Sodom: The Musical (1993)
- Snow White (1993) – First Stage Children's Theater, Milwaukee
- Babes in Toyland (1994) – Village Theatre, Issaquah
- The Sampo (1999) – FinnFest USA ’99
- Christmas Ghost Story (2000)
- Socrates (Never Fall in Love With a Beautiful Boy) (2001)
- Troublemaker's Mother (2010) – Finlandia Foundation
- Gildong (2016) pre-production

=== Films ===
- Frankenstein (Stage One, Louisville Kentucky for Globalstage, 1997)

== See also ==
- Official Nick DiMartino website
- Goodreads profile
- UBS Shelf Life
- NW Booksellers profile
- Shelf Awareness profile
- Book Lust Interview by Nancy Pearl
- Archived articles for Booklist 2007–2009
