= Logic Amen =

American community activist and organizer

- Born: Logic Seven Allah Amen; 1975 (age 50–51); Cincinnati, Ohio, U.S.
- Education: University of Washington

Logic Seven Allah Amen (born 1975), better known as Logic Amen, is a community activist and organizer from Seattle, Washington, as well as an educator, actor, and hip-hop songwriter. He is the creator and organizer of the Griot Party Experience event series and is known for his performance acting in the film Fantasy A Gets a Mattress.

== Early life and education ==
Logic Amen was born in Cincinnati, Ohio. Influenced by artists such as The Sugar Hill Gang and The O'Jays, he demonstrated interest in music early on. Amen is the eldest child of two parents in law enforcement.

Amen pursued academic studies at the University of Washington and earned a Bachelor's degree in English literature, as well as a Master's degree in teaching.

== Career ==
In 2017 Amen starred in the short film Fantasy A Gets Jacked. In 2023 Amen starred in the feature film Fantasy A Gets a Mattress, a film based on sections of fellow Seattle rapper Fantasy A's memoir.

== Filmography ==
Year	Title	Role	Notes	Ref(s)
2017	Fantasy A Gets Jacked	Ramon	Short	
2023	Fantasy A Gets a Mattress	Ramon		
