= Mountainside (2023 film) =

- Directed by: Mikiech Nichols
- Written by: Mikiech Nichols
- Produced by: Chad Courtney; Lisa Fortino; Ashley Hauser
- Starring: Mikiech Nichols; Nicole Merat; Monisa Brown; Alaina Moretti; Allyson Norton; Juan Rowland; Sarah Scheller
- Cinematography: Chad Courtney
- Edited by: Mikiech Nichols
- Release date: 2023
- Running time: 120 minutes
- Country: United States
- Language: English

Mountainside is a 2023 American independent comedy-drama film written and directed by Mikiech Nichols, starring Nichols, Nicole Merat, Monisa Brown, Alaina Morretti, and Allyson Norton. The film is set in Seattle and follows Felix, a 30-year-old film projectionist and floundering screenwriter who meets Stella, a chain-smoking cinephile whose friendship ends up inspiring him both creatively and romantically.

== Plot ==
Thirty year-old film projectionist and flailing screenwriter, Felix, struggles to connect with anyone outside of his sister and her girlfriend. To make things worse, an intense bout of writer's block doesn't seem to be going away anytime soon. After reluctantly joining a writing group and getting invited by someone to a party, Felix meets Stella, a down-to-earth, chain-smoking cinephile who he immediately clicks with. The two become fast friends, and over the next few months spend just about every waking moment with each other. But their seemingly perfect platonic friendship quickly becomes more complicated when Felix falls in love with Stella just as her new love-interest enters the picture. In an effort not to lose her as a friend, Felix tries to keep his feelings to himself and continue spending time with both Stella and her partner until he eventually feels the need to step back and accept a reality where he and Stella might never be together. In the end, Felix finds renewed creative inspiration, culminating in him writing and directing his first feature film.

== Cast ==
- Mikiech Nichols as Felix
- Nicole Merat as Stella
- Monisa Brown as Ilana
- Alaina Moretti as Gina
- Allyson Norton as Nora
- Juan Rowland as Elijah
- Sarah Scheller as Evelyn
- Rich Hawkins as Judas
- Fantasia Rose as Caroline

== Production ==
Mountainside was filmed entirely on location in Seattle, Washington, where most of the crew and cast were either from or lived during its two and a half years of production. The film was picked up for theatrical distribution by Compassionate Disaster Films and for streaming distribution by DeskPop Entertainment.

== Release and reception ==
=== Festivals ===
Mountainside was selected to screen at the following film festivals:

- 2022 Northwest Film Forum's Local Sightings Film Festival
- 2023 Tacoma Film Festival
- 2023 Beyond Hollywood Film Festival
- 2023 Spokane International Film Festival

=== Accolades ===
Awards and nominations for Mountainside
Award	Year	Category	Nominee	Result	Ref.
Spokane International Film Festival Jury Awards	2023	Best Northwest Feature	Mountainside	Won	
Beyond Hollywood International Film Festival Jury Awards	2023	Best Narrative Feature	Mountainside	Nominated	
