= DoNormaal =

- Born: Christianne Kenrieke Elise Karefa-Johnson; 1991 (age 34–35); Long Beach, California, United States
- Origin: Seattle, Washington, United States
- Genres: Hip hop
- Occupations: Rapper, actress
- Years active: 2010s–present
- Labels: Crane City Music, Not On Label

DoNormaal, also known as Christianne Kenrieke Elise Karefa-Johnson, is an American rapper and actress. She emerged on the Seattle music scene in the early 2010s and is known for her experimental style and lyricism.

== Early life and education ==
Christianne Kenrieke Elise Karefa-Johnson, professionally known as DoNormaal, was born in Long Beach, California, into a lineage of historically prominent black individuals from across the globe, including West Africa, the Caribbean, the United States, and South America. She is one of five siblings and has a twin sister, Gabriella Karefa-Johnson, a stylist and fashion editor.

Her maternal grandfather, John Karefa-Smart, was a prince of the chiefdom of Rotifunk in Sierra Leone and played a pivotal role in the country’s independence from Britain in 1961. Her maternal grandmother, Rena Joyce Waller Karefa-Smart, was the first Black woman to graduate from Yale Divinity School and the first to earn a ThD (Doctor of Theology) from Harvard.

On her father Kenrick Karefa-Johnson's side her lineage includes Guyana’s first Black physician, as well as Ken “Snakehips” Johnson, the leader of Britain’s influential West Indian Dance Orchestra active in the 1930s. Her paternal grandmother, of Trinidadian and Bajan descent, immigrated to the United States in the 1960s in search of better educational opportunities for her children. DoNormaal’s father, an urban planner, died shortly after her birth at the age of 42.

Following her father’s death, her family relocated frequently, including a year spent in Sierra Leone before the civil war forced their departure. They eventually settled in Southern California when she was six years old, though her childhood remained nomadic as they moved between cities under the care of her mother, Suzanne.

DoNormaal studied poetry at and received her Bachelor's degree from Sarah Lawrence College in Bronxville, New York.

== Career ==
DoNormaal began her music career in the early 2010s, performing at venues in Seattle. She gained recognition for her unique style, blending introspective lyrics with experimental beats.

In 2015, she released her debut album, Jump or Die, which garnered positive reviews from critics. The album showcased her versatility as an artist and established her as a rising star in the hip-hop scene.

In 2017, she followed up with her sophomore album, Third Daughter, which further solidified her reputation as an innovative and boundary-pushing artist. The album received critical acclaim for its bold experimentation and thought-provoking themes.

Her participation in the Roland-sponsored "Desert Days" event in 2018 led to a reinvention of her musical style, garnering praise from critics for her willingness to explore new sonic territories. The event inspired her to experiment with different sounds and techniques, resulting in a new level of creativity and innovation in her music.

In 2021 DoNormaal released the single "Baby May" along with an accompanying music video.

According to The Seattle Times, DoNormaal's creative mix of harmony and dissonance has captivated listeners with her vibrant and intense studio work, as well as her compelling live performances.

NPR highlighted DoNormaal as one of the key figures in the Seattle music scene, describing her as a visionary artist pushing the boundaries of hip-hop. The article praised her sophomore LP for being a fearless explorer of sound and lauded her ability to push the boundaries of hip-hop while maintaining authenticity and integrity.

DoNormaal also ventured into acting, appearing as a supporting actress in the 2023 film Fantasy A Gets a Mattress.

== Discography ==
| Year | Album | Record label |
|---|---|---|
| 2015 | Jump or Die | Not On Label |
| 2017 | Third Daughter | Not On Label |
| 2024 | PALMSPRINGA (with Welp Disney) | Not On Label |

== Critical reception ==
DoNormaal's music has been praised for its innovative approach to hip hop. In a review for Respect My Region, her music video for "Ego Slave," directed by Noah Zoltan Sofian, was described as "a work of art that perfectly complements the intensity of the track". American Songwriter included DoNormaal in their "Five to Discover" feature, noting her as an artist on the rise. Additionally, What's Up! Magazine praised DoNormaal's versatility and described her music as "a little bit of everything", highlighting her ability to blend various styles and influences.
