= Brief Encounter (disambiguation) =

Brief Encounter is a 1945 British film.

Brief Encounter may also refer to:

== Film and TV ==
- Brief Encounter (1974 film), a British-Italian drama
- Gregory Crewdson: Brief Encounters, a 2012 documentary about art photographer Gregory Crewdson
- Brief Encounters (TV series), a 2016 British TV series
- "Brief Encounter" (Birds of a Feather), a 1990 TV episode
- "Brief Encounter" (Family Guy), a 2021 TV episode
- "Brief Encounter" (This Life), a 1996 TV episode
- "A Brief Encounter", a 2013 episode of Miranda

== Music ==
- Brief Encounter (opera), a 2009 opera by André Previn, based on the 1945 film
- Brief Encounter (album), an album by Marillion
- Brief Encounter, an album released in 2006 by jazz musician Eddie Daniels
- Brief Encounters, an album by Amanda Lear
- "Just A Brief Encounter," Dinah Shore 1962
