= Gregory Crewdson =

American photographer

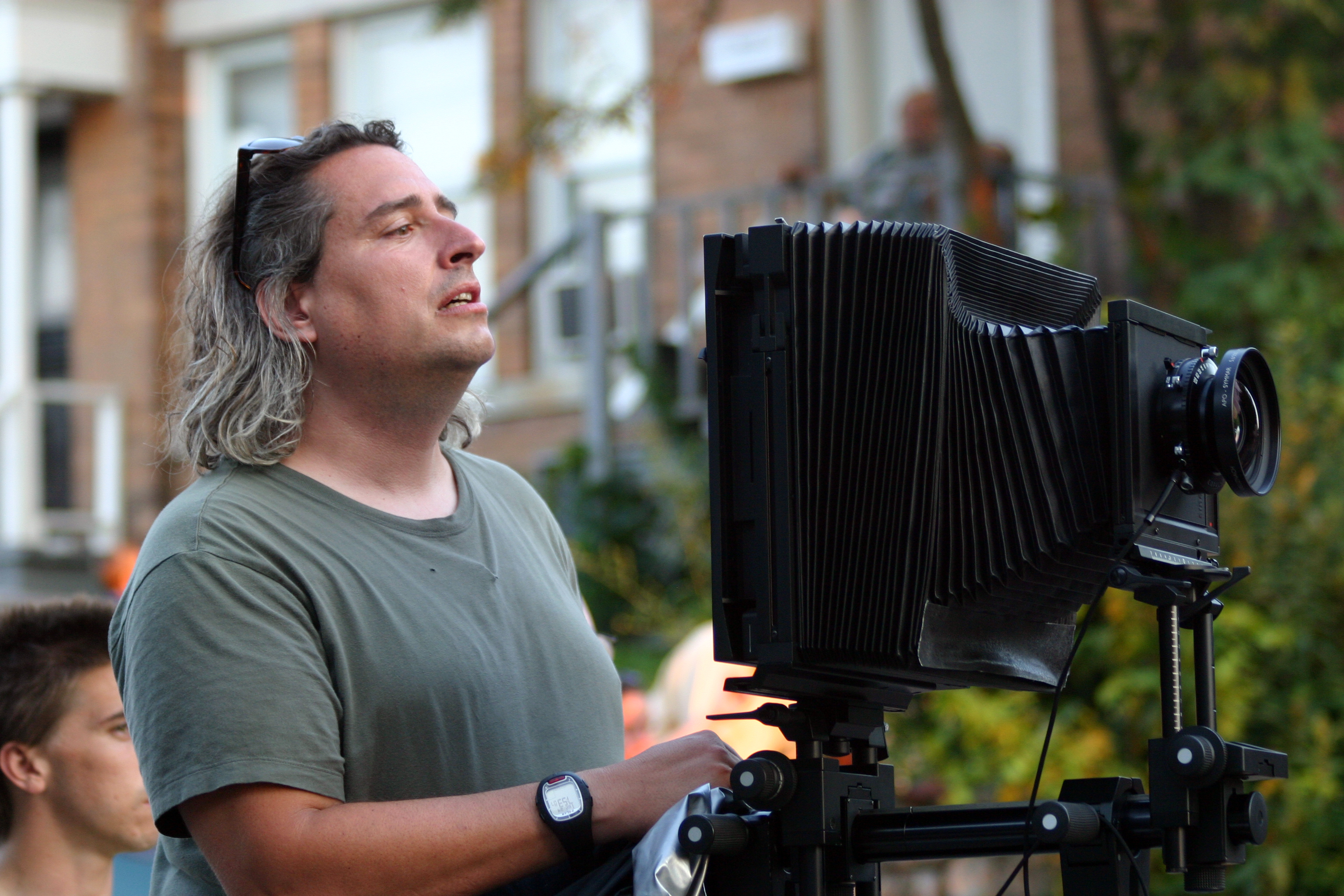
- Crewdson on location in Pittsfield, MA, 2007
- Born: September 26, 1962 (age 64); Brooklyn, New York
- Education: Brooklyn Friends; John Dewey High School; SUNY Purchase, BA, 1985; Yale University, MFA, 1988
- Occupations: Fine-art photographer, professor
- Employer: Yale University School of Art
- Awards: Skowhegan Medal for Photography, National Endowment for the Arts Visual Artists Fellowship
- Website: gagosian.com/artists/gregory-crewdson/

Gregory Crewdson (born September 26, 1962) is an American photographer who makes large-scale, cinematic, psychologically charged prints of staged scenes set in suburban landscapes and interiors. He directs a large production and lighting crew to construct his images.

== Early life and education ==
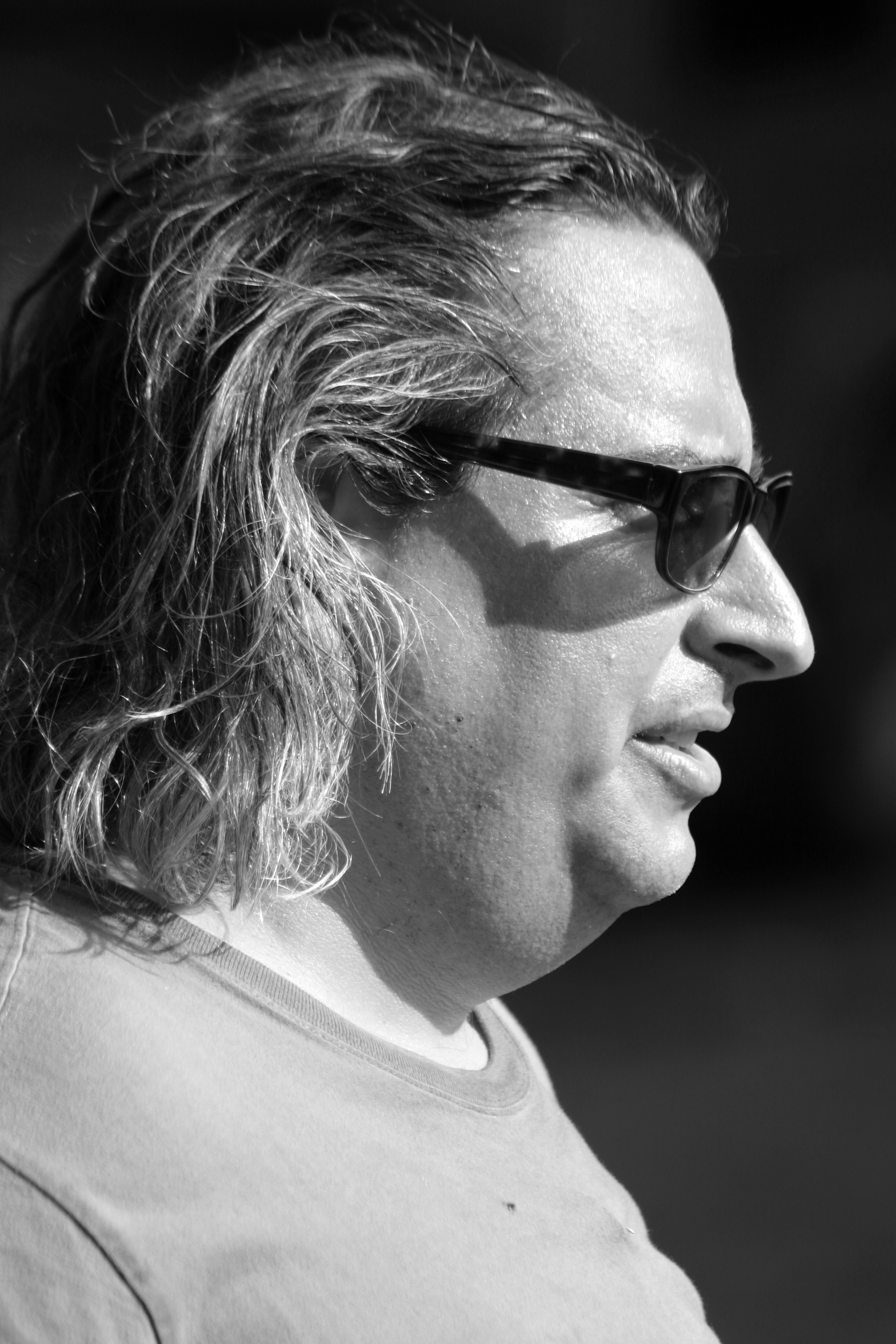
Crewdson in 2007

Crewdson was born in the Park Slope neighborhood of Brooklyn, New York. As a child, he attended Brooklyn Friends School, and then John Dewey High School.

As a teenager, he was part of a power pop group called Speedies. Their song "Let Me Take Your Photo" was used in 2005 by Hewlett-Packard in advertisements to promote its digital cameras.

Crewdson attended Purchase College, State University of New York, where he initially planned to study psychology. At Purchase, he enrolled in a photography course taught by Laurie Simmons and also studied with Jan Groover. He received an MFA in photography from the Yale School of Art.

== Life and career ==
Crewdson is a professor and the director of graduate studies in photography at Yale School of Art.

Untitled photo from Crewdson's series Beneath the Roses (2003–2008)

Crewdson's photographs are elaborately planned, produced, and lit using crews familiar with motion picture production who light large scenes using cinema production equipment and techniques. He works with a lighting team, art director, make-up and wardrobe department, props and effects to create mood, atmosphere, and open-ended narrative images. He has worked with the same director of photography, Richard Sands, along with other core team members, for some 25 years. He works much like a director with a budget similar to that of a movie production, each image involves dozens of people and weeks to months of planning.

Using shots that resemble film productions, Crewdson deconstructs American suburban life in his work. He has cited the films Vertigo, The Night of the Hunter, Close Encounters of the Third Kind, Blue Velvet, and Safe as having influenced his style, as well as the painter Edward Hopper and photographer Diane Arbus.

Crewdson's most widely-known bodies of work include Twilight (1998–2002), Beneath the Roses (2003–2008), Cathedral of the Pines (2013–2014), An Eclipse of Moths (2018–2019), and Eveningside (2021–2022). Crewdson's only body of work made outside of the U.S. was Sanctuary (2009), set at the Cinecittà studios in Rome. Nearly all of his other work before and since was made in the small towns and cities in Western Massachusetts.

In 2012, he was the subject of the feature documentary film Gregory Crewdson: Brief Encounters. The film series followed the construction of and an explanation by Crewdson of his thought process and vision for pieces of Beneath the Roses.

== Personal life ==
As of 2020, Crewdson lives primarily in western Massachusetts in a former Methodist church. His long time partner, Juliane Hiam, is a writer and producer, and the two work closely together. Hiam has also appeared as a subject in numerous of Crewdson's pictures. Crewdson has two children from a previous marriage. Crewdson is an open-water swimmer and has said that the meditative state he achieves with his daily swimming practice is fundamental to his creative process as an artist.

== Publications ==
- Twilight: Photographs by Gregory Crewdson. Harry N. Abrams, 2002. ISBN 0810910039. With an essay by Rick Moody.
- Fireflies. Skarstedt Fine Art, 2007. ISBN 0970909055.
- Beneath the Roses. With Russell Banks. Harry N. Abrams, 2008. ISBN 978-0810993808.
- Dream House. With text by Tilda Swinton. John Rule, 2009. ISBN 978-8888359410.
- Sanctuary. With Anthony O. Scott. Hatje Cantz, 2010. ISBN 978-3775727341.
- Cathedral of the Pines. New York: Aperture, 2016. ISBN 978-1-597113-50-2. With a text by Alexander Nemerov.
- An Eclipse of Moths. New York: Aperture, 2020. ISBN 978-1683952213. With an introduction by Jeff Tweedy.
- Gregory Crewdson: Eveningside, 2012–2022. Milan: Skira Editore, 2022. ISBN 8857248429. Text by Jean-Charles Vergne.

Collections

- Hover. Artspace Books, 1995. ISBN 1891273000.
- Dream of Life. Ed. Salamanca, D. Steinke, B. Morrow, 1999. ISBN 84-7800-097-6
- Gregory Crewdson: 1985–2005. Hatje Cantz, 2005. ISBN 377571622X.
- In a Lonely Place. Hatje Cantz, 2011. ISBN 978-3775731362.
- Gregory Crewdson. New York: Rizzoli, 2013. ISBN 978-0847840915.
- Alone Street. New York: Aperture, 2021. ISBN 978-1597115131. With an essay by Joyce Carol Oates and an interview with the artist by Cate Blanchett.
- Gregory Crewdson. Munich, London, New York: Prestel, 2024. ISBN 9783791391243. Edited by Walter Moser, with texts by David Fincher, Daniela Hammer-Tugendhat, Beate Hofstadler, Astrid Mahler, Watler, Moser, Matthieu Orléan, and Emily St. John Mandel.

== Awards ==
- Aaron Siskind Foundation Individual Photographer's Fellowship
- Skowhegan Medal for Photography, Skowhegan School of Painting and Sculpture, Skowhegan, ME.
- Skowhegan Medal for Photography
- National Endowment for the Arts fellowship
- Honorary Doctorate, Montserrat College of Art, Beverly, MA.
- Honorary Doctorate, SUNY Purchase, NY.
- Distinguished Artist Award, St. Botolph Club Foundation, Boston, MA.

== Collections ==
Crewdson's work is held in the permanent collections of major institutions worldwide, including:

- Albertina Museum, Vienna
- The Broad, Los Angeles
- The Getty Museum, Los Angeles
- Los Angeles County Museum of Art, Los Angeles
- Metropolitan Museum of Art, New York
- Museum of Modern Art, New York
- San Francisco Museum of Modern Art, San Francisco
- Solomon R. Guggenheim Museum
- Victoria and Albert Museum, London
- Whitney Museum, New York
- Yale University Art Gallery, New Haven

== Films about Crewdson ==
- Gregory Crewdson: Brief Encounters (2012) – feature documentary directed, produced, and shot by Ben Shapiro
- There But Not There (2017) – short documentary about Crewdson's casting process, directed by Juliane Hiam
- Making Eveningside (2022) – short interpretive documentary directed by Harper Glantz, set to original music by Stuart Bogie and James Murphy (electronic musician) about the making of Eveningside
