= Ben Shapiro (director) =

American film director (born 1959)

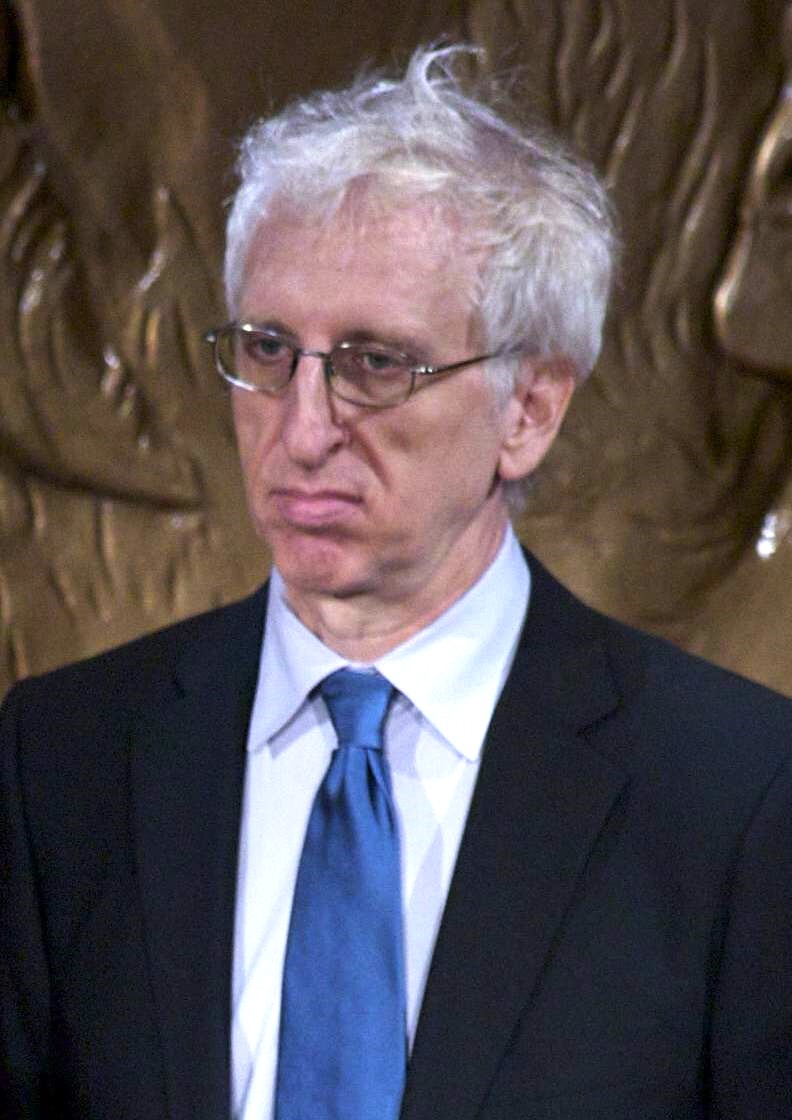
- Shapiro in 2013
- Born: 1959 (age 66–67)
- Occupations: Director cinematographer public radio producer
- Notable work: Max Roach: The Drum Also Waltzes; Gregory Crewdson: Brief Encounters; Radio Diaries

Benjamin Shapiro (born 1959) is an American documentary director, cinematographer, audio producer, and independent public radio producer. Shapiro work spans over 30 years and he honors including two Peabodys and two Dupont Awards.

== Life and career ==
Benjamin Shapiro was born in 1959. As a teenager, Shapiro learned to play the drums.

Shapiro's radio stories have been featured on such programs as NPR's All Things Considered and Morning Edition. He has been a member of Radio Diaries since the series began in 1996, as an editor, mix engineer, and producer. Shapiro has collaborated on projects with many producers including American Radioworks, The Kitchen Sisters, WNYC and the BBC.

Shapiro is co-director/producer (with Sam Pollard) and cinematographer of the documentary Max Roach: The Drum Also Waltzes, which explores the life and career of the master drummer, bandleader, activist across seven decades. The film premiered at the 2023 South by Southwest Film Festival, and had its broadcast premiere on the PBS series American Masters.

Shapiro directed and was cinematographer of the documentary Gregory Crewdson: Brief Encounters, which follows the photographer over a decade as he creates his images. Brief Encounters premiered at the South by Southwest Film Festival and is screening theatrically at festivals and on television internationally. The New York Times rated the film as a "Critics' Pick," and Variety described it as "must see."

Shapiro's work as a cinematographer and producer includes projects for PBS (American Masters, PBS Arts, EGG), National Geographic, The Sundance Channel, and independent filmmakers including Katy Chevigny, Barbara Kopple, the feature "Paul Goodman Changed my Life," among others.

Shapiro has been published in the Journal of Popular Film and Television and Transom.org. He has taught at the Columbia Graduate School of Journalism, the New School University Graduate Media Studies program, and the Center for Documentary Studies at Duke University.

== Awards ==
For his work, Shapiro has received an Emmy award, two Peabody Awards, and two Dupont Awards.
