= Spokane International Film Festival =

Annual film festival in Spokane, WA

Spokane International Film Festival (SpIFF)
- Location: Spokane, Washington, U.S.
- Founded: 1999 (as Spokane Northwest Film Festival)
- Founded by: Contemporary Arts Alliance (CAA)
- Artistic director: Pete Porter
- Language: English
- Website: spokanefilmfestival.org

Spokane International Film Festival is a film festival held annually in Spokane, Washington, United States, during the first weekend of February. It emphasizes films made by or featuring individuals from the Pacific Northwest and is one of the largest film festivals in Washington and the region.

Spokane International Film Festival (SpIFF) showcases a varied program of short, mid-, and feature-length films—both narrative and documentary—from both around the world, with an emphasis on featuring films from the Pacific Northwest.

== History ==
Founded in 1999, the festival—originally called the Spokane Northwest Film Festival—was formed by the Spokane-based nonprofit Contemporary Arts Alliance (CAA), with Bob Glatzer serving as the inaugural artistic director. The festival continues to be affiliated with and receive financial support from CAA. The name of the festival was changed to Spokane International Film Festival in 2002 to emphasize the widening scope of the programmers. The festival is held at the Bing Crosby Theater and the Magic Lantern Theatre.

== Awards ==
The Spokane International Film Festival announces the Golden SpIFFY and Silver SpIFFY jury awards each year. Also the festival's most popular films are awarded audience choice awards. Ballots are cast by audience members at the end of each movie. Additionally, there are awards judged by the festival's senior programmers.

2022 Film Festival Awards
Award	Film title	Director(s)
Northwest Short Golden SpIFFY Jury Award	Break Any Spell	Anton Josef and Lisa Purr
Narrative Feature Golden SpIFFY Jury Award	Landlocked	Timothy Hall
Best Documentary Golden SpIFFY	Vinyl Nation	Kevin Smokler and Christopher Boone
Most Promising Filmmaker Programmer Award	Dear Nanay	Frances Grace Mortel

2023 Film Festival Awards
Award	Film title	Director(s)
Northwest Short Golden SpIFFY Jury Award	Kumari: A Father's Dream	Sean O’Connor
Northwest Feature Golden SpIFFY Jury Award	Mountainside	Mikiech Nichols
Narrative Short Golden SpIFFY Jury Award	Before Dawn, Kabul Time	Tara Motamedi
Documentary Feature Golden SpIFFY Jury Award	Sam Now	Reed Harkness
Animated Short Golden SpIFFY Jury Award	Flowing Home	Sandra Desmazières
Most Promising Filmmaker Programmer Award	Bug	Abel Bos

2024 Film Festival Awards
Award	Film title	Director(s)
Northwest Short Golden SpIFFY Jury Award	Cloud Striker	A.W. Hopkins
Northwest Short Silver SpIFFY Jury Award	Impenetrable	Geena Pietromonaco
Northwest Feature Golden SpIFFY Jury Award	Bones of Crows	Marie Clements
Northwest Feature Silver SpIFFY Jury Award	Where the Rope Ends	Baylee Sinner
Narrative Short Golden SpIFFY Jury Award	Left Handed	Nasrin Mohammadpour
Narrative Short Silver SpIFFY Jury Award	Solo un Ensayo	Hugo Sanz
Narrative Feature Golden SpIFFY Jury Award	Fancy Dance	Erica Tremblay
Narrative Feature Silver SpIFFY Jury Award	Avenue of the Giants	Finn Taylor
Documentary Short Golden SpIFFY Jury Award	Things Long Left Unsaid	Antonia Thornton
Documentary Short Silver SpIFFY Jury Award	She Marches in Chinatown	Della Chen
Documentary Feature Golden SpIFFY Jury Award	Richland	Irene Lusztig
Documentary Feature Silver SpIFFY Jury Award	Coming Around	Sandra Itäinen
Animated Short Golden SpIFFY Jury Award	Harvey	Janice Nadeau
Animated Short Silver SpIFFY Jury Award	Zeb's Spider	Sophie Jarvis and Alicia Eisen
Most Promising Filmmaker Programmer Award	Fantasy A Gets a Mattress	David Norman Lewis and Noah Zoltan Sofian
Most Promising Filmmaker Programmer Award	Headdress	Taietsarón:sere 'Tai' Leclaire
