= Benjamin Hedin =

American author of Parisian descent

- Born: Paris, France
- Education: M.F.A. - Fiction from The New School

Benjamin Hedin is an American author of Parisian descent who has published widely. He is also a university professor and has written and produced two documentary feature films.

== Biography ==
Hedin, son of poet and translator Robert Hedin, was born in Paris, France, and raised in North Carolina and Minnesota. After studying music at the College of William and Mary, he earned his M.F.A. in fiction from The New School. He then began teaching, first at Long Island University and The New School, then in the Expository Writing Program at New York University.

== Career ==
Hedin's fiction, essays, and interviews have been published in The New Yorker, Slate, The Nation, Chicago Tribune, Poets and Writers, Salmagundi, The Georgia Review, The Gettysburg Review, and Radio Silence. He is the editor of Studio A: The Bob Dylan Reader, widely regarded as one of the finest collections of music writing, and the author of In Search of the Movement: The Struggle for Civil Rights Then and Now. He wrote and produced the documentary Two Trains Runnin' and wrote the documentary MLK/FBI. His debut novel, Under the Spell will be published by Northwestern University Press in 2021.

== Published works ==
- Studio A: The Bob Dylan Reader (Hedin as editor), W. W. Norton & Company, 2005, ISBN 978-0393327427
- In Search of the Movement: The Struggle for Civil Rights Then and Now, City Lights, 2015, ISBN 978-0872866478
- Under the Spell: A Novel, Northwestern University Press, 2021, ISBN 978-0-8101-4372-2

== Documentaries ==
- Two Trains Runnin' (Hedin as writer, producer), Avalon Films, 2016
- MLK/FBI (Hedin as co-writer, producer), IFC Films, 2020
