= Fantasy A =

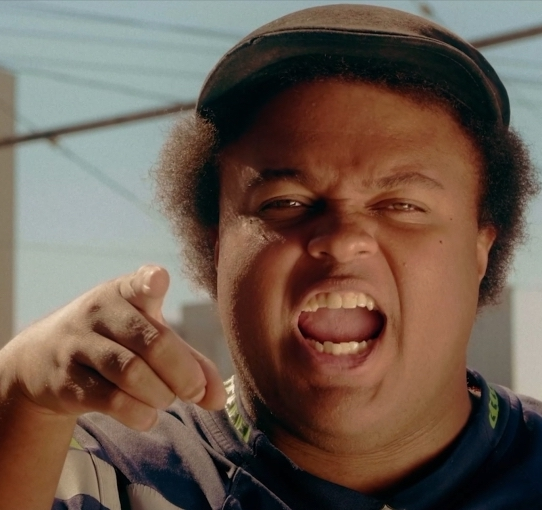
- Fantasy A starring in Fantasy A Gets a Mattress
- Born: Alexander Leroy Hubbard; May 23, 1993 (age 33); Seattle, Washington, U.S.
- Occupations: Rapper; actor; songwriter; producer; author
- Years active: 2014–present
- Musical career
- Origin: Seattle, Washington, U.S.
- Genres: Hip hop
- Instrument: Vocals

Alexander Leroy Hubbard (born May 23, 1993), better known by his stage name Fantasy A, is an American rapper from Seattle, Washington working in the hip hop genre, as well as a songwriter, actor, and author. He is best known for his extensive guerrilla marketing and performance in the film Fantasy A Gets a Mattress.

== Early life ==
Fantasy A was born in Seattle, Washington, where he was diagnosed with autism at the age of three. He attended Thurgood Marshall Elementary as well as Cleveland High School (Seattle) before graduating from The Center School in 2011. While in high school he gained an interest in literature and wrote three books later published as School Rich (2012), Life in the Eyes of an Autistic Person (2012), and Life in the World of Gabe Fabens and Sage the Scholar (2013).

== Career ==
In the mid-2010s Fantasy A began to gain notice in the Seattle area for his guerrilla promotional campaigns where he would cover every neighborhood in posters for his books and music. The campaigns were so extensive that it was covered by both The Stranger and the Seattle Weekly. In 2017 Fantasy A starred in the short film Fantasy A Gets Jacked, which marked the start of his work in film. In 2019 he became a reoccurring guest on KJR-FM's The Wake Up Show where he reviewed movies.

In 2023 Fantasy A starred in the feature film Fantasy A Gets a Mattress, based loosely on his life and sections of his memoir. The film gained a cult following, winning Best Narrative Feature at the Seattle Black Film Festival before going on to a sell out a twenty-screening-long run at The Beacon Cinema. The film continued to sell out screenings at festivals and indie cinemas—three times at Grand Illusion Cinema, three times at Central Cinema, at the Seattle International Film Festival Film Center during Northwest Folklife Festival, at the opening night screening at Northwest Film Forum's Local Sightings Film Festival, and at the opening night screenings at the Tacoma Film Festival. The film also opened the Silent City Film Festival in Ithaca, New York and won Best Narrative Feature at Local Sightings Film Festival, Best PNW Narrative Feature at the Tacoma Film Festival, as well as Best Comedic Feature at the Silent City Film Festival.

== Discography ==
Albums

- Fantasy A Has Gone Irish Green (2014)
- Summer in Seattle (2014)
- Fantasy A Has Come 2 Seatown (2014)
- Enter Da World of Fantasyania (2016)

Singles

- Be My Seattle Sweetheart (2015)
- Loyal Fan Rick (2021)
- Gotta Love Dick's (2021)

== Filmography ==
=== Film ===
Year	Title	Role	Notes	Ref(s)
2017	Fantasy A Gets Jacked	Himself	Short	
2023	Fantasy A Gets a Mattress	Himself		
