= C. J. Elleby =

American basketball player (born 2000)

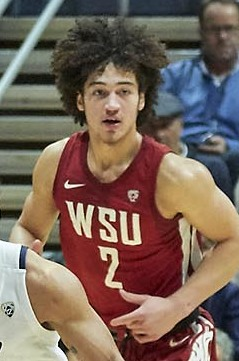
- Elleby with Washington State in 2020

No. 16 – Hapoel HaEmek
- Position: Small forward
- League: Israeli Basketball Premier League

Personal information
- Born: June 16, 2000 (age 26) Federal Way, Washington, U.S.
- Listed height: 6 ft 6 in (1.98 m)
- Listed weight: 200 lb (91 kg)

Career information
- High school: Cleveland (Seattle, Washington)
- College: Washington State (2018–2020)
- NBA draft: 2020: 2nd round, 46th overall pick
- Drafted by: Portland Trail Blazers
- Playing career: 2020–present

Career history
- 2020–2022: Portland Trail Blazers
- 2022–2023: Iowa Wolves
- 2023: Salt Lake City Stars
- 2023: Bnei Herzliya
- 2023: Greensboro Swarm
- 2024: Mexico City Capitanes
- 2024–2025: MKE Ankaragücü
- 2025–2026: Hapoel Be'er Sheva
- 2026–present: Hapoel HaEmek

Career highlights
- First-team All-Pac-12 (2020); Pac-12 All-Freshman Team (2019)
- Stats at NBA.com
- Stats at Basketball Reference

Charles James Elleby (born June 16, 2000) is an American professional basketball small forward for Hapoel HaEmek of the Israeli Basketball Premier League. He played college basketball for the Washington State Cougars, and was drafted in the 2nd round of the 2020 NBA Draft by the Portland Trail Blazers.

== Early life ==
Elleby was born in Federal Way, Washington. He attended Cleveland High School in Seattle. As a sophomore, Elleby averaged 16 points and 10 rebounds and helped lead Cleveland to the state playoffs. He averaged 23.0 points, 13.0 rebounds and 4.0 assists per game and was named second-team All-Metro League in his junior season. Elleby averaged 23.5 points per game as a senior and was named first-team All-Metro and first-team All-State by the Associated Press and The News Tribune. Elleby committed to play college basketball at Washington State early in his senior year over offers from Washington and Seattle.

== College career ==
Elleby averaged 14.7 points, 7.1 rebounds, and 3.0 assists per game as a true freshman and was named to the Pac-12 Conference's All-Freshman team. He scored a season-high 26 points against rival Washington. In the wake of the firing of WSU head coach Ernie Kent, Elleby initially declared for the 2019 NBA draft but did not hire an agent and ultimately decided to return to Washington State for his sophomore season.

Elleby entered his sophomore season as a preseason first team All-Pac-12 selection and was named to the Julius Erving and Wooden Award watchlists. Elleby was named the Pac-12 Player of the Week on January 20, 2020, after scoring 25 points with a career-high 14 rebounds in 72–61 victory against eighth-ranked Oregon and scoring 22 points with nine rebounds and five assists in a 89–76 win over Oregon State. Elleby scored a career-high 27 points with 12 rebounds and hit a go-ahead three-pointer with four seconds left to beat Arizona State 67–65. Elleby set a new career high with 34 points while also grabbing 10 rebounds on February 9, 2020, in a 79–67 win over Washington. Elleby became the third-fastest player in Cougars' history to score 1,000 career points during a 21-point performance in a 78–74 win over Washington to complete a regular season sweep of the Huskies. At the conclusion of the regular season, Elleby was named to the First Team All-Pac-12.

As a sophomore, Elleby averaged 18.4 points (4th in the Pac-12), 7.8 rebounds (7th), 1.9 assists, and 1.8 steals (1st) per game, while shooting 82.3% (6th) from the free throw line. Following the season, he declared for the 2020 NBA draft. On July 31, Elleby announced he was remaining in the draft, forgoing two seasons of college eligibility.

== Professional career ==
=== Portland Trail Blazers (2020–2022) ===
Elleby was selected with the 46th pick in the 2020 NBA draft by the Portland Trail Blazers. On November 22, he signed a two-year contract and announced that he would wear the number 16 with Portland.

In 2020-21, in 30 games he averaged 2.3 points, 1.1 rebounds, and 6.4 minutes per game. In 2021-22, in 58 games he averaged 5.8 points, 3.9 rebounds, 1.5 assists, and 20.2 minutes per game.

=== Iowa Wolves (2022–2023) ===
On August 23, 2022, Elleby signed with the Minnesota Timberwolves. He was then later waived on October 15, 2022. On November 2, 2022, Elleby was named to the opening night roster for the Iowa Wolves. He averaged 11.9 points, 4.9 rebounds, 2.1 assists, 1.3 steals, and 23.4 minutes per game, over 28 games.

He was waived on February 2, 2023.

=== Salt Lake City Stars (2023) ===
On February 20, 2023, Elleby was acquired by the Salt Lake City Stars.

=== Bnei Herzliya (2023) ===
On April 19, 2023, Elleby signed with Bnei Herzliya of the Israeli Basketball Premier League. He played one game, in which in 18 minutes he scored 9 points and grabbed 5 rebounds.

=== Greensboro Swarm (2023) ===
On October 30, 2023, Elleby rejoined the Salt Lake City Stars, but was waived on November 9. Thirteen days later, he signed with the Greensboro Swarm, but was waived on December 11.

=== Mexico City Capitanes (2024) ===
On March 27, 2024, Elleby joined the Mexico City Capitanes.

=== MKE Ankaragücü (2024–2025) ===
Elleby in 2024

On July 14, 2024, Elleby signed with MKE Ankaragücü of the Türkiye Basketbol Ligi.

=== Hapoel Be'er Sheva (2025–2026) ===
In 2025-26, he played for Hapoel Be'er Sheva of the Israeli Basketball Premier League. In 21 games he averaged 18.3 points, 6.9 rebounds, 3.5 assists, 1.2 steals, 0.9 blocks, and 33.7 minutes while shooting 80.5% from the free throw line.

=== Hapoel HaEmek ===
In 2026-27, he is playing for Hapoel HaEmek in the Israeli Basketball Premier League.

== Career statistics ==
Legend
GP	Games played	GS	Games started	MPG	Minutes per game
FG%	Field goal percentage	3P%	3-point field goal percentage	FT%	Free throw percentage
RPG	Rebounds per game	APG	Assists per game	SPG	Steals per game
BPG	Blocks per game	PPG	Points per game	**Bold**	Career high

=== NBA ===
==== Regular season ====
Year	Team	GP	GS	MPG	FG%	3P%	FT%	RPG	APG	SPG	BPG	PPG
2020–21	Portland	30	0	6.8	.279	.206	**.733**	1.1	.3	.2	.1	2.3
2021–22	Portland	**58**	**28**	**20.2**	**.393**	**.294**	.714	**3.9**	**1.5**	**.6**	**.3**	**5.8**
Career		88	28	15.5	.390	.275	.717	2.9	1.1	.5	.3	4.6

==== Playoffs ====
Year	Team	GP	GS	MPG	FG%	3P%	FT%	RPG	APG	SPG	BPG	PPG
2021	Portland	2	0	4.0	.000	—	—	1.5	.5	.0	.0	.0
Career		2	0	4.0	.000	—	—	1.5	.5	.0	.0	.0

=== College ===
Year	Team	GP	GS	MPG	FG%	3P%	FT%	RPG	APG	SPG	BPG	PPG
2018–19	Washington State	**32**	28	31.0	**.436**	**.414**	.661	7.1	**3.0**	1.0	.6	14.7
2019–20	Washington State	**32**	**32**	**33.4**	.396	.339	**.823**	**7.8**	1.9	**1.8**	**.8**	**18.4**
Career		64	60	32.2	.413	.367	.749	7.5	2.4	1.4	.7	16.6

== Personal life ==
Elleby's father, Bill Elleby, played basketball collegiately at California and runs Seattle Basketball Services, a collegiate scouting service. Elleby has four siblings.
