= Brite Futures =

American indie rock/electronica band

- Origin: Seattle, Washington, USA
- Genres: Indie rock Electronica
- Years active: 2005–2012
- Labels: Turnout, Warner Bros., Team Swan
- Past members: Shaun Libman; Luke Smith; David Price; Claire England; Conor Sisk; Liam Downey, Jr.

Brite Futures (formerly known as Natalie Portman's Shaved Head, often shortened to NPSH) was an American indie rock/electronica band from Seattle, Washington. The group released its debut album in July 2008 and disbanded in 2012. Their former name is a reference to actress Natalie Portman's physical appearance in the film V for Vendetta.

== History ==
=== Formation ===
The band was formed by Luke Smith and Shaun Libman, who met while attending The Center School, an arts-based college preparatory school in Seattle. Their early work was centered around keyboards and drum machines, the only instruments that the pair knew how to play at the time. Their decision to start Natalie Portman's Shaved Head was made in the food court of the Center House, in 2005. The name of the band is a reference to Natalie Portman's physical appearance in the film V for Vendetta. Smith and Libman's first written songs for Natalie Portman's Shaved Head were about "fruit snacks and partying". The band claimed one of the reasons they formed the band was to get girlfriends.

The group expanded to a four piece before playing their first major gig, at the grand opening of the 826 Seattle writing center and Greenwood Space Travel Supply Company. They invited their friends David Price and Claire England to the band, and later recruited Liam Downey, Jr. from another band that they found on MySpace. Smith typically writes the band's music, and then writes lyrics with Libman afterwards. The band would place Natalie Portman on the guest list of all of their shows, but the actress has not yet attended any performances. Portman was, however, aware of the band's name and existence. England's sister, a New York City resident, met the actress once, and relayed to her the history and story of the band. Signing an autograph for them, she said in response to the story, "Oh, that's cool."

=== Glistening Pleasure, 2008–2011 ===
Natalie Portman's Shaved Head's debut album, Glistening Pleasure, was released by Team Swam Records on July 15, 2008. The release party for the album was held at Easy Street Records in the Queen Anne neighborhood of Seattle, where Liam Downey, Jr.'s good friend Benjamin Bucy was mugged for a copy of the album. The group have toured internationally with CSS, Matt & Kim, and The Go! Team and supported Lily Allen on her North American tour of her second album. Natalie Portman's Shaved Head had then begun work on their next album.

Keely Weiss of Aced Magazine described their music on Glistening Pleasure as reminiscent of Devo and an "unstoppable electronica/techno/funk/punk fusion". Their music has been described by Amy Atkins as evoking the sounds of 1980s music, and as "addictive dancey electro-pop". Michael Roberts of Westword called their sound "knowingly dorky party music" with "so many winks the average optometrist may suspect a serious vision issue." According to Smith, "We try to pack in as many melodies as possible and change it up a lot, as opposed to a straight repetitive style."

Natalie Portman's Shaved Head signed to Warner Bros. Records in late 2009 and digitally released their EP Meet Hot Singles with newer, improved versions of some songs off of Glistening Pleasure. Since the album was taken off the market, it was said that they would release it sometime early 2010.

On June 17, 2010, the band announced that their band name would now be Brite Futures, and posted their new single "Dog Eared Summer" on their website for free download. As for the name change, they have stated the following:

"We chose our band name on a whim when we were still in high school, and 'Natalie Portman's Shaved Head' has seen us through an unexpectedly amazing four years...But now it is summer once again, and time for a change. Also, it has recently come to our attention that our muse Ms. Portman is not so keen on us using her name in ours...so we feel it is time to move forward with a new name. We are Brite Futures."

After much anticipation, Brite Futures' Glistening Pleasure was rereleased as Glistening Pleasure 2.0 (referring to Justin Bieber's My World 2.0) on July 15, 2010, a two-year gap between their release dates. Three of the tracks on Glistening Pleasure (being "Beard Lust", "Mouth Full of Bones", and "The Malibu Highlife") did not make it to the 2.0 version. However, "Dog Eared Summer" and a brand new song called "My Funk" were introduced.

On September 13, 2010, Downey, Jr. announced that he amicably split from Brite Futures. The band stated that he "feels really good to be doing it on his own again, on a more intimate level with his music and himself." Downey, Jr.'s statement revealed his departure was based on "private and personal reasons, and the physical damage I have done to myself over the years while playing the music that I love." He also announced that he will be returning to his birth name. Downey, Jr. currently plays drums for local Seattle bands Total Shit and So Pitted, on top of being lead vocalist/drummer in his lifelong band the Fabulous Downey Brothers. Conor Sisk, formerly of the Port Townsend/Seattle-based band New Faces, went on to replace Downey, Jr. in the fall of 2011.

=== Dark Past, 2011–2012 (Disbanding) ===
With the new lineup, the band went on to release their third studio album, Dark Past, on November 1, 2011. It was produced by Smith and mixed by Eliot James (who has worked with the likes of Two Door Cinema Club and Kaiser Chiefs) and was distributed by Atlantic Recording Corporation for the United States and Canada. The album had two singles, "Too Young To Kill" and "Test of Time (ft. Pearl Dragon)", both of which had music videos released through VEVO within the following year. The fifth track, "Best Party Ever (So Far)" was included in the trailer for the movie Fun Size, starring Victoria Justice, in fall of 2012.

On May 15, 2012, Brite Futures announced through their blog that they were breaking up and would no longer be recording new music, citing the band's slowing momentum and other individual aspirations. They played a final show at The Vera Project in Seattle on June 16, 2012. Downey, Jr. was present and went onstage to play drums for "Hush Hush". Shortly after the show, the band's main website became defunct.

Later that year, the band announced via Facebook that they would soon make a number of unreleased material available. October 30, 2012 marked the digital-only release of When the Lights Go Out, a collection of Demos, B-Sides, and live tracks recorded over the life of Natalie Portman's Shaved Head and Brite Futures.

== Members ==
- Shaun Libman – vocals, cow bell, claps, tambourine, antics
- Luke Smith – vocals, guitar, keyboard, drum programming, claps
- David Price – keyboard, guitar, vocals, claps
- Claire England – bass keyboard, vocals, claps
- Liam Downey - drums
- Conor Sisk – drums, vocals, claps

== Discography ==
- Secret Crush EP (2008)
- Glistening Pleasure (2008)
- Meet Hot Singles EP (2009)
- Glistening Pleasure 2.0 (2010)
- Dark Past (2011)
- When the Lights Go Out (2012)
