= Cleveland High School (Seattle) =

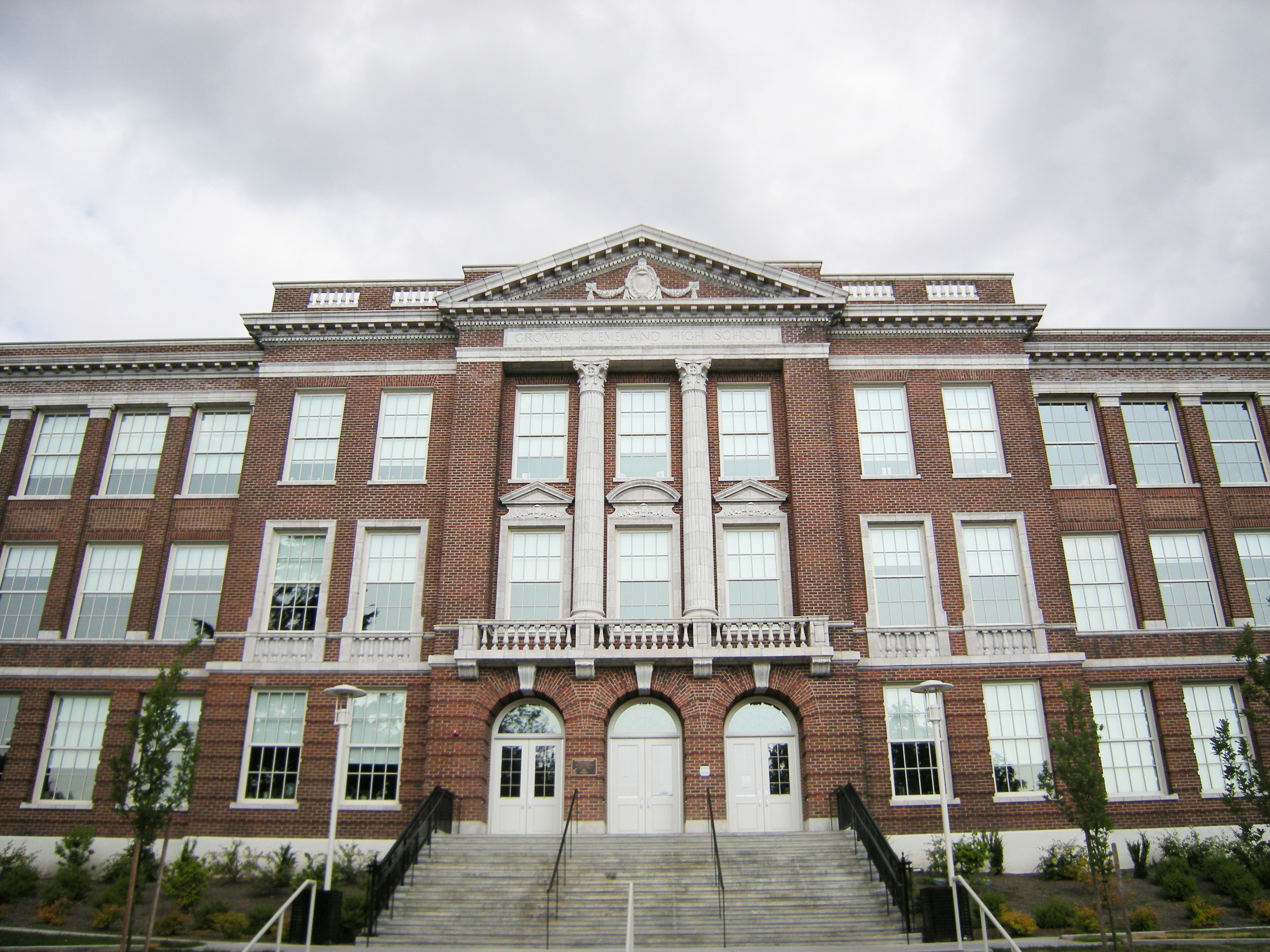
- Main Entrance

Location
- 5511 15th Avenue South; Seattle, Washington 98108; United States; 47°33′09″N 122°18′51″W

Information
- School type: Public, high school
- Motto: "We Do Different Better"
- Established: 1927
- School district: Seattle School District
- Principal: Jeff Lam
- Teaching staff: 48.10 (FTE)
- Grades: 9-12
- Enrollment: 890 (2023-2024)
- Student to teacher ratio: 18.50
- Campus size: 5.1 acres (21,000 m^{2})
- Colors: Red, Black & White
- Mascot: Eagle
- Newspaper: The Cleveland Journal
- Website: Cleveland High School

Seattle Landmark
- Designated: 1981

Cleveland High School, also known as Grover Cleveland High School and Cleveland STEM High School, is a public secondary school located in Seattle, Washington. It is operated as part of the Seattle Public Schools system and serves the Beacon Hill and Georgetown neighborhoods. The school was established in 1927 and named for President Grover Cleveland, and its building is a designated city landmark.

== History ==
The then-independent city of Georgetown established a high school in 1903, with one class graduating from the facility at the Mueller School annex. Beginning in 1905, Georgetown and south Seattle students were moved to high schools across the city, including West Seattle, Queen Anne, Broadway and Franklin.

The Seattle Public Schools board approved construction of a new high school in the south end of Seattle in 1925, after petitioning from residents. The new school, which was named for President Grover Cleveland in accordance with naming schools after famous Americans, opened on January 3, 1927, and graduated its first class in the spring. Cleveland High School also initially hosted a middle school, named Grover Cleveland Junior High School, that was moved to Asa Mercer Junior High School in 1957. The school was expanded with a new north wing in 1958, featuring a new metal shop classroom, and facilities for art, band and choir, paid for by a citywide bond issue approved in 1955. A new $1.25 million gymnasium and administrative offices were dedicated by Mayor Wes Uhlman and Lieutenant Governor John Cherberg in 1970.

Cleveland, the smallest of the city's high schools with a capacity of 729 students, was slated for conversion into a middle school by the school board in 1979. Under the plan, high school students would be moved to the Asa Mercer Junior High School several blocks to the north, saving $4 million in potential renovation costs for the school district. Students and faculty were strongly opposed to the closure plan, and it was ultimately modified to keep Cleveland open as a high school.

After the approval of a citywide levy for school improvements in 2001, Cleveland High School underwent a $68 million, two-year renovation in 2006. The project was completed in September 2007, after complications arising from asbestos found in ceilings and unexpected geological hazards below the school building. Earlier concepts for the renovation included sharing the building with a community college, as well as splitting the high school into four autonomous schools.

== Architecture ==
Cleveland High School is still housed in its original 1927 building, designed in the 20th century Neo-Georgian style by Floyd Naramore, who would later become a founding member of NBBJ. The three-story school building has a brick facade with a terra cotta trim. The center of the building features a two-story bay with a balcony and Corinthian columns.

The high school, located atop southwestern Beacon Hill, overlooks Georgetown, the Duwamish River valley, Boeing Field, and Interstate 5.

== Athletics ==
Cleveland competes in WIAA Class 2A and is a member of the Metro League in District Two.

=== State championships ===
- Boys Basketball: 1975, 1976
- Girls Basketball: 2010, 2013, 2014
- Girls Track and Field: 1989
- Boys Ultimate: 2020

=== State appearances ===
- Cross Country: 1974
- Boys Basketball: 1975, 1976, 1978, 1979, 2016
- Girls Basketball: 2010, 2013, 2014, 2015
- Boys Track and Field: 1979
- Girls Track and Field: 1987, 1988, 1989
- Boys Ultimate: 2020, 2024

=== Retired numbers ===
Boys Basketball:

- C.J. Elleby - #2
- Carl Ervin - #10
- James Woods - #22
- Jawaan Oldham - #33

== Demographics ==
Cleveland's student body is predominantly Asian American and African American. In 2021, students of color accounted for 92.1% of the student body, although this had fallen to 87.5% by 2024.

In 2024, the school had 889 students, of which the racial demographics were 46% Asian, 21% Black, 12.5% White, 10.6% Hispanic, 9% Multiracial, 0.3% Pacific Islander, 0.2% Native American, and 0.3% from other races. 48% of students were female, and 52% were male.

== Programs ==
In 1993, Cleveland became the home to the Fish and Roses project, integrating fish farming and hydroponics into the school's curriculum. Mark Weber, the project originator, and principal Ted Howard Sr. wanted to see the project used as the focus of a new math and science based school. A separate building was built with funding from Boeing and Costco to house the project, but within a few years the building was razed to make room for remodeled gym and school spaces.

In 2003, under a Gates Foundation grant, the district separated Cleveland into four small academies: the Infotech Academy, which had started up in a small way in 2000 before the grant; the Arts and Humanities Academy; the Health, Environment and Life Academy (HEAL); and the Global Studies Academy. By 2009 Cleveland retained the Global Studies and HEAL academies, but overall academic improvement remained elusive, with a 56.7% graduation rate (on time or otherwise).

In 2008, Cleveland was one of two high schools included in the Southeast Initiative, a plan to increase expenditures for three years at schools that parents had fled under the school choice plan. The Seattle Times School Guide reported that Cleveland's 2008 on-time graduation rate had been 44%. Cleveland's enrollment remained low at 695 students in 2008–2009, 94% of them from minority ethnic groups. Few of Cleveland's students chose it as their first choice.

Starting in fall 2010, Cleveland became a citywide science, technology, engineering and mathematics (STEM) high school, divided into a life sciences and global health academy and an engineering and computer science academy. Only 21% of Cleveland's 10th graders passed the WASL math test in 2009 and 16% passed the science test, up from 12% and 6.9% in 2008. Cleveland's 2010–2011 11th and 12th graders were not accepted into STEM, but continued to attend Cleveland in a general studies program until the transition was complete. The school's 2009–2010 9th graders were enrolled in STEM as 10th graders. The incoming 9th grade class from throughout the city was the model for all future STEM cohorts. Future high schoolers from Cleveland's own neighborhood, if they do not enroll in STEM, are sent to nearby high schools. Cleveland's school day is half an hour longer than in other Seattle high schools.

By the time school opened in September 2010, the name of the engineering academy became the School of Engineering and Design. Computer science was offered as an elective course open to students in all grades. Juniors and seniors were allowed to take freshman and sophomore STEM courses if they wish.

== Notable alumni ==
- Fantasy A (born 1993), rapper and actor
- Nick DiMartino (born 1946), author and playwright
- C. J. Elleby (born 2000), basketball player in the Israeli Basketball Premier League
- Bob Hasegawa (born 1952), Washington State senator
- Claudia Kauffman (born 1959), Washington State senator
- Randy Montgomery (born 1947), former football player in the National Football League
- Jawann Oldham (born 1957), former basketball player in the National Basketball Association
- Kip Tokuda (1946-2013), social worker and politician
- Mitsuye Yamada (born 1923), Japanese-American poet and activist
