= The Center School (Seattle) =

Coordinates: 47°37′18″N 122°21′03″W

Location
- 305 Harrison Street; Seattle, WA 98109; United States

Information
- Type: Public
- Established: 2001
- Principal: Marcus J. Pimpleton
- Grades: 9-12
- Enrollment: 153 (2025-26)
- Colors: Red, Silver, White and Black
- Mascot: The Dragon
- Website: Official webpage

The Center School is a small arts and college preparatory public school in Seattle, Washington and is part of Seattle Public Schools. It is located in the Seattle Center Armory, a multi-purpose building on the grounds of the Seattle Center. Because of its unique placement, the Center School is affiliated with several local arts organizations, including the Seattle Repertory Theatre, KCTS and Pacific Northwest Ballet.

== Extracurricular organizations ==
Several organizations at the school have a largely political focus, including the Model United Nations club and SIPA (Students Inspiring Political Activism). Such groups have drawn a focus to the problems facing the school, the city, and the international community. Other organizations include an improv team, crafting club, yearbook committee, and glee club.

=== MUN ===
The Model United Nations program at the Center School has been active in the local WASMUN conference since the school's inception, most recently in spring of 2007 with around 50 delegates, a significant portion of WASMUN's attendees. In 2005, 2006, and 2007, the club visited New York City for the National High School MUN conference, bringing a delegation of 39 students, more than one seventh of the Center School's population. For the first time in 2010, the Center School went to San Francisco and Berkeley for the conference. In 2011 the group went back to New York's NHSMUN.

=== SIPA ===
The Students Inspiring Political Activism (SIPA) group took on several projects while it was active, with membership varying from year to year. At one time, students stated that they believed that abstinence-only sex education did not adequately prepare students to make safe sexual decisions. SIPA put together a curriculum over the course of the school year and then presented it to the rest of the school.

In 2006 the group's agenda was to confront the achievement gap and the segregation and bias that still occurs within school districts, part of which addressed educating staff members on the issues of race from the perspective of a student.

== Sports ==
The Center School has no official sports teams or clubs, although it has access to the nearby Memorial Stadium for any sporting events.

=== Ultimate Frisbee ===
Students at the Center School were able to play for other high schools sports teams and other extracurricular organizations in the Seattle School District until policies from the Ultimate Players Association only allowed students to play on their own high school's Ultimate Frisbee Team.

In early February, 2006, a Frisbee team was formed. The team name was initially registered as The Mighty Fighting Kites, although this changed frequently until a team member came up with the name The Mornin' After, which became the team's official name. The name didn't become a problem until the first semester of the 2006-2007 school year, when the principal, Brian Vance complained that the name had inappropriate connotations. The team name was allowed to stand when Brian Vance left and new principal, Lisa Escobar, came to the school.

In the Spring season of 2006, the team's first season, the Center School ranked 4th in the Western Washington region. The Western Washington region has produced the majority of the past national champions.

In the Spring season of 2007, the Mornin' After placed 5th in the High School B Division at "Spring Reign", one of the biggest Frisbee tournaments in the US, 2nd prior to play-offs, and took 1st place in the B Division playoffs.

The team did not go to "Spring Reign" in 2010, but placed a high B in the High School Division. It has since disbanded.

== Controversy and criticism ==
The Center School came under criticism in Jonathan Kozol's 2005 book The Shame of the Nation. Kozol discussed some Seattle schools including Thurgood Marshall Elementary School, The Center School, and African American Academy as an examples of the disparity between races in American education. Within the book, Kozol explained how the Center School was conceived in order to serve the mostly white neighborhoods Queen Anne and Magnolia and draws parallels between the group of white parents that petitioned for its creation and the group that filed a lawsuit preventing the Seattle School District from considering race when placing students. Kozol cited statistics that showed a discrepancy among students who utilize the school when compared to districtwide data. In its first year, 83% of students at Center School were white, compared to 40% districtwide; 6% of the population was black, while black students made up 25 percent of the District's student body overall.

== Notable alumni ==
- Fantasy A, actor; rapper
- The now-defunct electronica band Brite Futures all attended the Center School.
- Andrew J. Lewis, Seattle city councilman
- Harris Reed, fashion designer
