= Dark Past =

Studio album by Brite Futures
- Released: November 1, 2011
- Genres: Indie rock, synthpop, pop
- Labels: Turnout, LLC
- Producer: Luke Smith

Dark Past is the third and final studio album by Seattle-based band Brite Futures, released on November 1, 2011 through Turnout, LLC. It was available for purchase through various formats - CD, vinyl, and digital download. The album also came with an optional package of merchandise, which included a t-shirt, sunglasses, and a poster.

== Track listing ==
1. "Baby Rain" – 3:37
2. "Kissed Her Sister" – 3:34
3. "Too Young to Kill" – 3:08
4. "Jag In a Jungle" – 3:18
5. "Best Party Ever (So Far)" – 2:25
6. "Winterlude" – 0:55
7. "Tell It to Me" – 3:11
8. "Cosmic Horn" – 5:09
9. "Test of Time (feat. Pearl Dragon)" – 3:39
10. "Black Wedding" – 3:52

"Too Young to Kill" and "Test of Time (feat. Pearl Dragon)" were released as singles through VEVO.
"Best Party Ever (So Far)" was featured in the trailer for the 2012 movie Fun Size.
"Jag in a Jungle" is included in the LEGO Movie (2014) soundtrack.
