= MLK/FBI =

- Film poster
- Directed by: Sam Pollard
- Written by: Benjamin Hedin; Laura Tomaselli
- Produced by: Benjamin Hedin
- Cinematography: Robert Chappell
- Edited by: Laura Tomaselli
- Music by: Gerald Clayton
- Production companies: Field of Vision; Tradecraft Films; Play/Action Pictures
- Distributed by: IFC Films
- Release dates: September 15, 2020 (TIFF); January 15, 2021 (United States)
- Running time: 104 minutes
- Country: United States
- Language: English
- Box office: $45,200

MLK/FBI is a 2020 American documentary film directed by Sam Pollard (known for co-directing the 1987 Oscar-nominated Eyes on the Prize), from a screenplay by Benjamin Hedin and Laura Tomaselli. It follows Martin Luther King Jr. as he is investigated and harassed by J. Edgar Hoover's Federal Bureau of Investigation.

== Synopsis ==
The film explores the investigation and harassment of Martin Luther King Jr. by J. Edgar Hoover and the Federal Bureau of Investigation, through newly declassified documents. Interviews with Beverly Gage, David J. Garrow, Andrew Young, Donna Murch, James Comey, Clarence Jones, Charles Knox, and Marc Perrusquia also appear in the film. The interviews are presented largely as voiceover; some of the interviewees briefly appear on camera at the end of the film.

Much of the documentary utilizes archival footage of MLK between 1955 and 1968, the years of his work as a civil rights activist. It is largely chronological, showing a young MLK from 1963 until 1968 when he was assassinated. No new information is revealed about his assassination. The last sequence makes the statement that not all FBI documents have been declassified, and that the whole record will be declassified and made available to the public in 2027.

The documentary covers the attempts by Hoover and the FBI to discredit King by collecting recordings and images of his private sexual life with women other than his wife. This is to denigrate his status within the civil rights movement for black people in the United States, which was gaining momentum. There is a stark contrast between the thoroughly white complexion of the FBI and the many crowds of black people assembled around MLK.

== Release ==
The film had its world premiere at the 2020 Toronto International Film Festival. It screened at the 2020 New York Film Festival and was scheduled to be one of the closing night films at the San Diego International Film Festival in October.

IFC Films acquired American distribution rights to the film and set a release date for January 15, 2021.

== Reception ==
=== Critical response ===
On review aggregator website Rotten Tomatoes, the film holds an approval rating of 99% based on 124 reviews, with an average rating of 7.8/10. The site's critics consensus reads, "MLK/FBI presents a sobering overview of the American intelligence community's efforts to discredit and destroy a leader of the civil rights movement." On Metacritic, the film has a weighted average score of 82 out of 100, based on 21 critics, indicating "universal acclaim".

=== Accolades ===
MLK/FBI won the Best Documentary Award at the San Diego International Film Festival in October 2020.

== See also ==
- Civil rights movement in popular culture
