= Glistening Pleasure =

Studio album by Natalie Portman's Shaved Head
- Released: July 15, 2008
- Recorded: March 2007–February 2008
- Genre: Indie rock, synthpop, funk
- Label: Team Swam Records
- Producer: Lance Abair, Luke Smith

Professional ratings
Review scores
Source	Rating
Allmusic	3.5/5 stars

Glistening Pleasure is the debut album by Seattle-based rock band Natalie Portman's Shaved Head, released in the United States through Team Swam Records on July 15, 2008. The album was reissued, and remastered, in 2010 under the title Glistening Pleasure 2.0 under the name Brite Futures.

== Track listing ==
1. "Me + Yr Daughter" – 4:09
2. "Slow Motion Tag Team" – 3:15
3. "Iceage Babeland" – 4:42
4. "Mouth Full of Bones" – 3:52
5. "Holding Hands in the Shower" – 3:15
6. "L.A. Noir" – 3:48
7. "Staying Cool" – 3:39
8. "Bedroom Costume" – 3:06
9. "Hush Hush" – 3:18
10. "Beard Lust" – 3:24
11. "Sophisticated Side Ponytail" – 1:31
12. "The Malibu Highlife" – 3:23
13. "Confections" – 4:38

== Personnel ==
- Lance Abair – synthesizer, keyboards, producer, drum programming, synthesizer bass, guest appearance
- William "Billy" Brown – assistant
- Martin Feveyear – engineer, mixing
- Steve Hall – mastering
- Stefanie Moore – cover art
- David Price – guitar, keyboards, vocals, clapping, group member
- Martin Resch – guitar, guest appearance
- Larry Smith – producer
- Luke "Lukvatine" Smith – bass, guitar, percussion, keyboards, vocals, producer, clapping, drum programming, group member
