= Gabriella Karefa-Johnson =

Fashion editor and stylist (born 1991)

- Born: 1991 (age 34–35)
- Occupations: Fashion editor, fashion stylist

Gabriella Karefa-Johnson (born 1991) is an American fashion editor and stylist.

== Early life and education ==
The youngest of four siblings, Karefa-Johnson was raised in part by her grandparents after her father died when she was an infant. Her grandmother, Rena Karefa-Smart, was the first Black woman to graduate from Yale Divinity School, while her grandfather, John Karefa-Smart, was the first Foreign Minister of Sierra Leone. She attended the Thacher School in Ojai, California and earned a bachelor's degree from Barnard College.

== Career ==
Karefa-Johnson first joined Vogue as an associate fashion editor for fashion director Tonne Goodman. In 2017, she left Vogue for the fashion director post at Garage. She returned to Vogue after the closure of Garage and became the first Black woman to style a Vogue cover.

During her tenure at Vogue, Karefa-Johnson attracted media attention for her social media comments criticizing Kanye West for presenting "White Lives Matter" shirts at the 2022 Paris Fashion Week. West responded by posting Karefa-Johnson's picture on Instagram with the caption, "This is not a fashion person", exposing her to social media harassment.

In October 2023, Karefa-Johnson left Vogue due to the discomfort she felt at Conde Nast as an outspoken critic of the Israeli invasion of the Gaza Strip.
