= Gregory Crewdson: Brief Encounters =

- Directed by: Ben Shapiro
- Produced by: Ben Shapiro
- Starring: Gregory Crewdson
- Cinematography: Ben Shapiro; additional camera: Alex Rappoport; Costanza Theodoli-Braschi; Dietmar Post
- Edited by: Tom Patterson; Nancy Kennedy; Ben Shapiro
- Music by: Dana Kaproff
- Distributed by: Zeitgeist Films
- Release date: October 31, 2012 (New York City)
- Running time: 77 minutes
- Country: United States
- Language: English

Gregory Crewdson: Brief Encounters is a 2012 American documentary film directed, produced, and shot by Ben Shapiro. It premiered March 10, 2012 at the South by Southwest Film Festival and is distributed by Zeitgeist Films.

== Cast ==
- Gregory Crewdson
- Laurie Simmons
- Melissa Harris
- Rick Moody
- Russell Banks

== Critical response ==
The New York Times reviewed the film as a "Critics Pick".

Los Angeles Times film critic Betsy Sharkey wrote "in the excellent new documentary 'Gregory Crewdson: Brief Encounters,' filmmaker Ben Shapiro gives us fly-on-the-wall access over a 10-year period to an acclaimed artist."

Ronnie Scheib wrote in Variety: "A perfect canvas for Crewdson's epic creations, 'Brief Encounters' reps a must-see for art lovers."

Slant magazine said "Brief Encounters is great entertainment".

Gregory Crewdson: Brief Encounters won the Maysles Brothers Award for Best Documentary Film at the Denver Film Festival. The jury that presented the award said "A film that at first seems like a simple portrait of an artist, but actually touches on deep and complex issues facing suburban America today through provocative photographs."

The film won the Best Documentary Award at the Savannah Film Festival.

== Release ==
Gregory Crewdson: Brief Encounters premiered at South by Southwest, and opened at Film Forum in New York on October 31, 2012, and on November 16 2012 at the Film Society of Lincoln Center, then into limited theatrical release.

It has shown widely at film festivals in the US and internationally including SXSW, LACMA Film Independent, Big Sky, New Orleans, Newport, FIFA, and Oslo.

== Music ==
The original score was composed by Dana Kaproff. The soundtrack was released by Perseverance Records on December 5, 2012. The closing credit music is a performance of Crewdson's teenage band's song "Let Me Take Your Foto" by the group Little Silver.
