= Sam Pollard (filmmaker) =

American filmmaker

Samuel D. Pollard
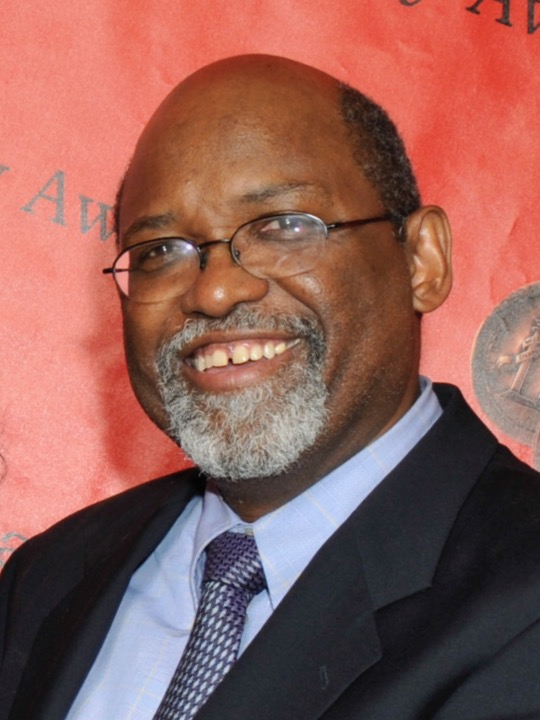
- Pollard at the 2011 Peabody Awards
- Born: Harlem, New York, U.S.
- Education: Baruch College (BA)
- Occupation: Filmmaker
- Awards: Peabody Award (2020)

Samuel D. Pollard is an American film director, editor, producer, and screenwriter. His films have garnered Peabodys, Emmys, and an Academy Award nomination. In 2020, the International Documentary Association gave him a career achievement award. Spike Lee, whose films Pollard has edited and produced, described him as "a master filmmaker." Henry Louis Gates Jr. said of his work: "When I think about his documentaries, they add up to a corpus — a way of telling African-American history in its various dimensions."

== Career ==
Born in Harlem, New York, Samuel D. Pollard began his career in 1972 as an editor for Victor Kanefsky, after having taken courses in a workshop organized by WNET. He obtained a BA degree from Baruch College in 1973. Early in his career, he assisted film editor George Bowers. St. Clair Bourne and was also a mentor of his.

== Awards and recognition ==
In 1998, Pollard received an Academy Award for Best Documentary Feature nomination for 4 Little Girls alongside Spike Lee. In 2010, Pollard (with Geeta Gandbhir and Arielle Amsalem) received a Primetime Emmy Award for Outstanding Picture Editing for a Nonfiction Program for the film By the People: The Election of Barack Obama. In 2020, the International Documentary Association gave Pollard its first Career Achievement Award.

MLK/FBI was named best documentary at the 2020 San Diego International Film Festival.

In 2021, Film at Lincoln Center put together "Tribute to Sam Pollard", featuring several of his documentaries and calling him one of "cinema’s most dedicated chroniclers of the Black experience in America."

In 2026, Pollard was selected as president of Main Competition jury at the 2026 BFI London Film Festival.

== Filmography ==
=== As director ===
- 1990 – Eyes on the Prize (2 episodes)
- 2016 – Two Trains Runnin'
- 2017 – The Talk: Race In America
- 2017 – ACORN and the Firestorm (with Reuben Atlas)
- 2017 – Maynard
- 2018 – Mr. Soul! (with Melissa Haizlip)
- 2020 – MLK/FBI
- 2021 – Black Art: In the Absence of Light
- 2021 – Citizen Ashe (with Rex Miller)
- 2022 – Lowndes County and the Road to Black Power (with Geeta Gandbhir)
- 2022 – Max Roach: The Drum Also Waltzes (with Ben Shapiro)
- 2023 – The League
- 2024 – Ol’ Dirty Bastard: A Tale of Two Dirtys (with Jason Pollard)
- 2025 – I Was Born This Way (with Jason Pollard)

=== As editor ===
- 1973 – Ganja & Hess
- 1978 – Just Crazy About Horses
- 1981 – Night of the Zombies
- 1981 – Body and Soul
- 1983 – Style Wars
- 1984 – Smithsonian World (television series)
- 1985 – Private Resort
- 1985 – Tornado!
- 1985 – Nova (television series)
- 1987 – Distant Harmony
- 1988 – Depression
- 1990 – Mo' Better Blues
- 1991 – Jungle Fever
- 1992 – Juice
- 1993 – Fires in the Mirror
- 1994 – Surviving the Game
- 1994 – No Dreams Deferred
- 1995 – Clockers
- 1996 – Girl 6
- 1997 – 4 Little Girls
- 2000 – Bamboozled
- 2000 – The Very Black Show
- 2000 – Half Past Autumn: The Life and Works of Gordon Parks
- 2002 – Hookers at the Point
- 2004 – Chisholm '72: Unbought & Unbossed
- 2004 – is not This a Time! A Tribute Concert for Harold Leventhal
- 2005 – Twelve Disciples of Nelson Mandela
- 2006 – When the Levees Broke
- 2007 – Pete Seeger: The Power of Song
- 2009 – By the People: The Election of Barack Obama
- 2010 – Gerrymandering
- 2010 – Joe Papp in Five Acts
- 2010 – If God Is Willing and da Creek do not Rise
- 2012 – Venus and Serena
- 2015 – Sinatra: All or Nothing at All
