= Seattle Children's Theatre =

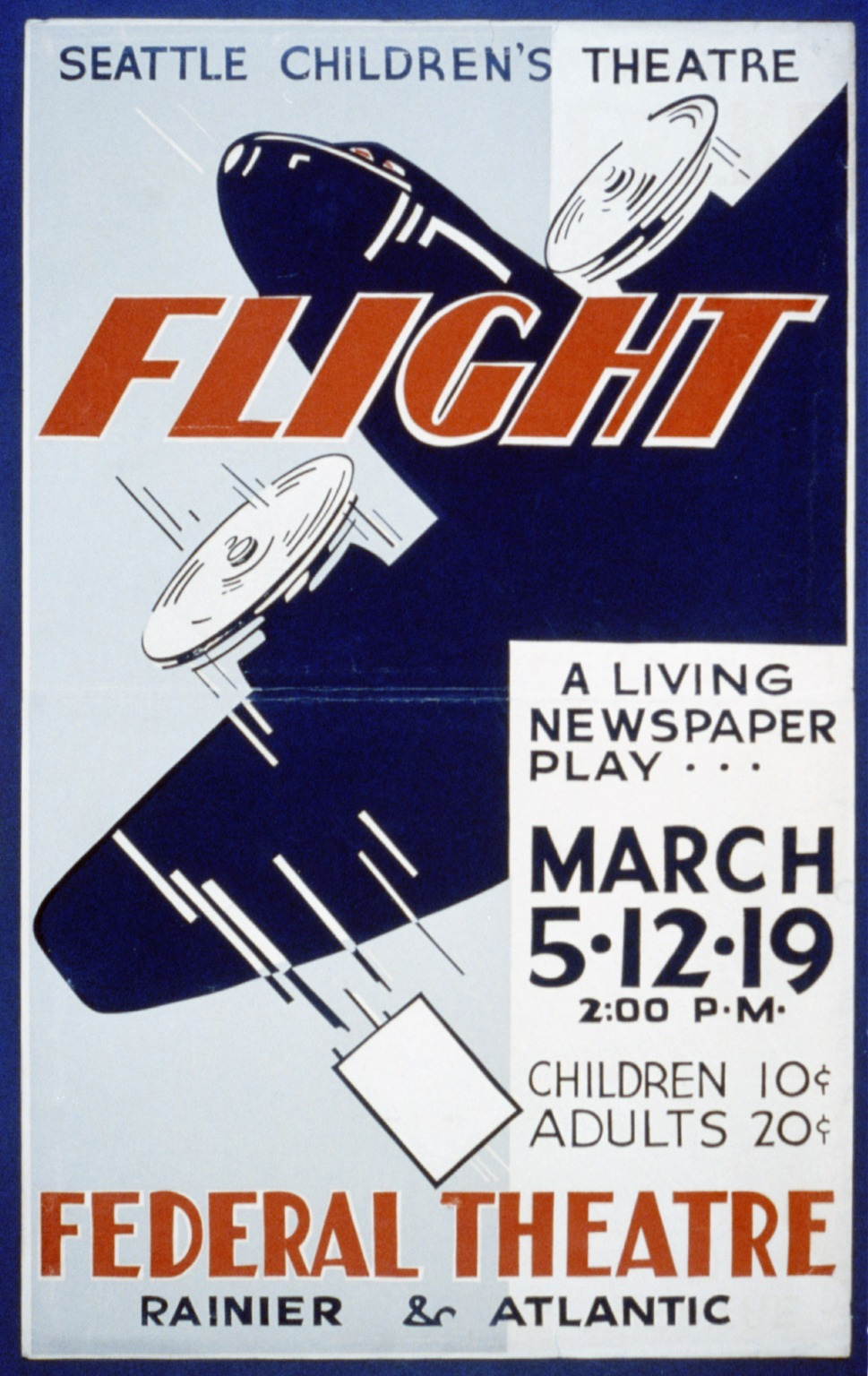
Seattle Children's Theatre [presents] "Flight" a living newspaper play

The Seattle Children's Theatre (SCT) is a resident theatre for young audiences in Seattle, Washington, founded in 1975. Its main performances are at the Seattle Center in a 482-seat and a 275-seat theatre, and its main theater runs from June through September. SCT also has a drama school with its own performances during the summer, connecting education and the arts.

SCT is a member of Theatre Puget Sound, International Performing Arts for Youth, and Theatre Communications Group.

As of 2020, SCT has produced over 269 plays, 120 of which are world premieres.

== Education programs ==
SCT has several theatre education programs held at schools and other organizations in the Seattle area. The on-site Drama School has classes year-round, taught by professional artists, and produces summer shows providing young people with participatory theatre education and theatre arts training. SCT's Deaf Youth Drama Program, founded by brothers Howie and Billy Seago, ran from 1994 to 2007. Seattle Children's Theatre has gained widespread prominence as a producer of theatre, educational programs, and new scripts for young people.

== Leadership ==
- Johamy Morales, Artistic Director
- Kevin Malgesini, Managing Director
- Laura Buckland, President of the Board of Trustees
- Linda Hartzell, Artistic Director Emerita

== See also ==
- Plays for Young Audiences
- Production History
