= Grand Illusion Cinema =

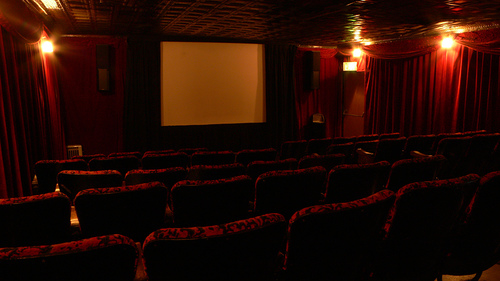
- Interior view
- Interactive map of Grand Illusion Cinema
- Former names: The Movie House
- Address: 1403 NE 50th St; Seattle, Washington; United States of America
- Coordinates: 47°39′53″N 122°18′46″W
- Owner: Northwest Film Forum
- Capacity: 68
- Screen: 1
- Current use: Film

Construction
- Built: 1920
- Opened: 1970 (Note: There are conflicting records about the cinema's opening, it either being in March or May of 1970)
- Renovated: 1997

Website
- www.grandillusioncinema.org

The Grand Illusion Cinema is the longest-running independent cinema in the city of Seattle, Washington, and has become a landmark of the film community. Opened as The Movie House in 1970, the cinema became the city's first intimate arthouse and showcased foreign and revival films. The Grand Illusion is located in Seattle's University District.

The Grand Illusion shows a wide variety of DCP, VHS, 16mm, and 35mm films ranging from new, independent, foreign, repertory classics, documentaries, and a consistent supply of "late nights" on the weekend which feature horror, sci-fi, and exploitation films. Over the years the cinema has been host to such people as Quentin Tarantino, Takashi Miike, Alex Cox, Eddie Izzard, Stuart Gordon, Don Hertzfeldt, Dennis Nyback, and the cast of Troll 2.

== History ==
The Grand Illusion Cinema first opened in the spring of 1970 under the name, The Movie House, given due to the existence of a small home on the site. Occupying the second floor of an early 20th-century building, the space used by the cinema was originally a dentist's office. Early films that were projected included international and obscure movies, and the cinema was known for an annual December showing of It's a Wonderful Life, an ongoing tradition that began in 1971.

The cinema was created by Randy Finley and the early success of the playhouse led to Finley creating the Movie House in Portland, Oregon in 1973. He then took over the Guild 45th Theater and created the Seven Gables Theatre at 50th and Roosevelt in Seattle. They, and other theaters, became the Seven Gables Theatre chain, which was later merged with Landmark Theatres. The Grand Illusion was never part of the Seven Gables chain and remained a popular independent venue.

The Movie House transferred ownership to Paul Doyle in 1979. Doyle changed the name of the theater to The Grand Illusion as an homage to "the medium of movies itself" and in honor of the 1937 Jean Renoir film, La Grande Illusion. A non-profit film arts organization, the Northwest Film Forum, saved the theater from closure in 1997, remodeled it, and revitalized interest in the institution. In 2004 the cinema was sold to a group of investors including several staff members. It currently exists as the only non-profit cinema in the United States completely volunteer-run.

In 2008, along with such seminal theatres as the Alamo Drafthouse in Austin and the Film Forum in New York, The Grand Illusion was named one of the best movie houses in America by Paste magazine.

=== Relocation ===
In April 2023, the owner of the building announced that the site was for sale and despite an active lease. By late 2024 it was announced that the building's new landlord declined to renew the cinema's lease in February 2025. The last public screening at the 1403 NE 50th St. location was at 10:00 pm on January 31, 2025, where a 35mm print of Stuart Gordon's 1985 film Re-Animator was projected. By the end of March 2025 the cinema would have completely vacated the original building with no new location yet announced. In the interim before moving into a new location, regular pop-up events at the Northwest Film Forum and elsewhere are being held. On September 22, 2026, it was announced that the Grand Illusion Cinema would take over the three-screen Varsity Theatre, which had closed its doors in the University District on January 15, 2026. The cinema signed a 10-year lease with plans to reopen the venue in late November or early December 2026.
