= Max Roach: The Drum Also Waltzes =

Documentary feature film

- Directed by: Sam Pollard; Ben Shapiro
- Produced by: Sam Pollard; Ben Shapiro
- Starring: Max Roach, Sonny Rollins, Quincy Jones, Ahmir "Questlove" Thompson, Abbey Lincoln, Harry Belafonte, Abdullah Ibrahim, Sonia Sanchez, Randy Weston, Jimmy Heath, Ayo Roach, Dara Roach, Maxine Roach, Daryl Roach, Raoul Roach
- Cinematography: Ben Shapiro
- Edited by: Russell Greene
- Music by: Christopher North
- Production companies: Max Roach FIlm LLC; Black Public Media; American Masters Pictures
- Release date: 2023
- Country: United States
- Language: English

Max Roach: The Drum Also Waltzes is a 2023 documentary film about the drummer, bandleader, and activist Max Roach. The film was directed by Sam Pollard and Ben Shapiro, edited by Russell Greene, with cinematography by Shapiro. The film premiered at the 2023 South by Southwest Film Festival.

== Synopsis ==
Max Roach: The Drum Also Waltzes tells the story of a musician whose ambitions were both inspired and challenged by the inequities of the society around him. The film follows Roach across seven decades—as a pioneering, master drummer, bandleader and cultural activist--from the revolutionary Bebop Jazz of the 1940s to the Civil Rights years; experiments in Hip Hop, multi-media works and more.

== Cast ==
- Max Roach
- Sonny Rollins
- Abdullah Ibrahim
- Harry Belafonte
- Abbey Lincoln
- Ahmir "Questlove" Thompson
- Quincy Jones
- Sonia Sanchez
- Fab 5 Freddy
- Dee Dee Bridgewater
- Randy Weston
- Julian Priester
- Jimmy Heath
- Albert "Tootie" Heath
- Jeff "Tain" Watts
- Ayo Roach
- Dara Roach
- Daryl Roach
- Raoul Roach

== Release ==
The film had its world premiere at the 2023 South by Southwest film festival, and its European premiere at the 2023 Sheffield DocFest.

The film aired nationally on the PBS American Masters series on October 6, 2023 and is available for streaming while appearing at film festivals worldwide.

== Reception ==
On the review aggregator website Rotten Tomatoes, the film has a rating of 100%.

The Austin Chronicle described it as an “Informative and powerful investigation into the musician’s accomplishments and legacy.”

The Washington Informer said: "Co-directors and producers Ben Shapiro and Sam Pollard have brought film, photos, and appearances from Roach’s contemporaries who tell his story. The film is outstanding."

The review website Hammer to Nail said, "By the end, we have come to know Roach in all his complicated glory. He was brilliant and mercurial, and left behind an inspirational legacy that remains as vibrant today as it ever was.”

Jacksonville Music Experience concludes its review of the film: "The Drum Also Waltzes is a worthy celebration of his life and music."

== Accolades ==
Max Roach: The Drum Also Waltzes was a finalist for the Library of Congress Lavine/Ken Burns Prize for Film
