= Oska Bright Film Festival =

Annual film festival in Brighton, UK

Oska Bright Film Festival (Oska Bright)
- Location: Brighton, East Sussex, United Kingdom
- Founded: 2004
- Language: English
- Website: oskabright.org

Oska Bright Film Festival is a film festival held annually in Brighton and Lewes in East Sussex. It showcases films made by or featuring individuals with learning disabilities, autism, and Asperger's and is the largest festival in the world with this focus. Its programming spans every genre, from comedy and sci-fi to documentary and dance.

== History ==
Founded in 2004, the Oska Bright Film Festival (OBFF) was founded by a group of learning disabled artists involved with the nonprofit organization Carousel who were frustrated by the lack of representation and opportunities for publicly screening their film work. The festival continues to be affiliated with and receive financial support from Carousel.

In 2019, Oska Bright was recognized as a BAFTA-qualifying festival and has been added to Section B of the BAFTA Qualifying Festivals List for both the British Short Film Award and the British Short Animation Award.

Some years of the festival have included satellite screenings held in different locations across the UK, including the Barbican Centre in London and the DCA in Dundee.
