= Northwest Film Forum =

- Interactive map of Northwest Film Forum
- Address: 1515 12th Avenue; Seattle, Washington; United States of America
- Coordinates: 47°36′52″N 122°19′01″W
- Owner: Northwest Film Forum
- Capacity: 156
- Screen: 2
- Current use: Film

Website
- nwfilmforum.org

The Northwest Film Forum (NWFF) is a nonprofit independent art house cinema and film-focused organization in Seattle's Capitol Hill neighborhood. that hosts screenings, multiple film festivals, film workshops, and public events.

== History ==
In late 1994, filmmakers Jamie Hook and Deborah Girdwood received a King County Arts Commission Grant, to form the non-profit WigglyWorld Studios—the organization which Northwest Film Forum originates from. Launching in 1995, WigglyWorld Studios was a filmmaking artist collective located on Capitol Hill in the Capitol Hill Arts Center, a former Odd Fellows meeting hall. The organization provided film screenings, filmmaking equipment, post-production suites, and workshops to the public and independent filmmakers.

Initially operating as a nomadic organization, screening films at various venues, in 1997 the Northwest Film Forum bought the Grand Illusion Cinema. "WigglyWorld" was now the name of the educational and outreach wing of the nonprofit. In 1998, NWFF bought a space on 19th and Mercer that became The Little Theatre, opening in 1999 as an 64-seat art house dual cinema and live theater.

NWFF began to expand its programming and outreach efforts, with the support of Seattle venture capitalist Nick Hanauer and other donors, and in 2008 moved to a 8,000-square-foot facility.

NWFF annually hosts the Local Sightings Film Festival, which programs exclusively films by Pacific Northwest filmmakers.
