= The Immaculate Conception of Little Dizzle =

- Directed by: David Russo
- Written by: David Russo
- Produced by: Peggy Case
- Cinematography: Neil Holcomb
- Edited by: Billy McMillin
- Music by: "Awesome"
- Release date: January 19, 2009
- Running time: 98 minutes
- Country: United States
- Language: English

The Immaculate Conception of Little Dizzle is a 2009 American dark comedy written and directed by David Russo. It stars Marshall Allman as Dory, an unusually religious young man who, after losing his job as an IT manager, is forced to work as a janitor. Everything is going well until he and his colleagues realize they are being used as guinea pigs involuntarily by the owners of the company.

== Plot ==
The film begins with a bottle being thrown into the sea. Dory is an IT manager from Seattle and he sits on a beach of the Puget Sound reading a Bible. The bottle drifts until Dory finds it. He reads the message inside it, which turns out to be an obscene message. He is upset and confused and he decides to go back to work. At work, Dory is overwhelmed by a woman speaking on the phone and his co-worker Jason trying to make small talk. Dory snaps and breaks the woman's phone. He gets fired and as he is walking away, Jason gives him a card for Spiffy Jiffy Janitorial Services, offering him a job with his sister.

After failing to get another job, Dory calls the number on the card and he meets Ethyl, Methyl, and OC, the self proclaimed face of Spiffy Jiffy. OC puts him to work immediately, telling him about the offices they are cleaning. Corsica is a product research company, run by a man named Gary, that employs Tracy, the woman OC is interested in. One day, while cleaning Corsica's offices, Dory finds some cookies in the trash can and he eats one. He has a strange reaction to it and he spits out immediately. Tracy sees him and explains it was an exothermic reaction caused by edible thermophenylene that made him react the way he did. She offers him a spot in a focus group to taste the cookies. Dory accepts and brings OC along to help him get closer to Tracy.

Dory works for a while and he begins to get into a rhythm when he finds a blue explosion in a toilet in the men's bathroom. Dory thinks he sees something moving in the water and he shares his findings with the rest of the gang. OC takes a picture of it before flushing it away.

Some time later, Tracy and Gary are talking to the cookie company's CEO about the generally negative reactions to the cookies. Gary suggests more testing and Tracy offers up Spiffy Jiffy as a test group for the new versions of the product. They all agree and they leave the cookies for Spiffy Jiffy to find when they clean later on. Dory, who is now wearing a yarmulke, and OC find the cookies. They have gotten better and they share them with Ethyl and Methyl.

On the 4th of July, all of the janitors go to the rooftop where they eat more cookies. It is then that the men begin to have hallucinations. Methyl sees a fish in the sparks and fireworks. The next day Dory and OC begin to have digestive problems. Dory tells OC it may be because they have been eating so many cookies. He is dismissed and OC changes the subject by inviting Dory to a show for his band, Pure White Turd, a show Tracy is also invited to.

Dory goes to the show but does not really pay attention due to the fact that he is reading about Buddhism. After some drinking, Dory hallucinates a painting at the bar of a blue fish swimming through space in a park and in the city. Meanwhile, at Corsica, Methyl also hallucinates and he wrecks some displays. He gets sent home and Ethyl goes to pick up OC, but he's busy talking with Tracy, so she takes Dory instead. As he leaves, Dory tells OC, “I'm Sorry” and it inspires the artist in OC. Now that they are alone, OC tries to seduce Tracy but he gets interrupted by some terrible cramps.

While cleaning, Dory and Ethyl find Gary's collection of porn and she seduces him to have sex with her. The morning after, Ethyl drops Dory off unceremoniously and he regrets having sex with her. In his guilt, Dory converts to Islam and prays as he talks to OC about how he feels bad for coming between Ethyl and Methyl. OC tells him he is not as important as he thinks he is. OC finds out that he got a grant for $8500 and he celebrates that he can quit being a janitor and can finally focus on his art.

Later on, Dory gets really bad cramps and goes to an ER where a doctor tells him it is because he has been eating too many cookies and laughs him out of the office, leaving him with a large medical bill. He gets a card to a nurse's hotline to avoid going back and getting another bill if anything happens again.

Dory is now dressed in Hindu garb. He is singing a Hindu song in a staircase when Methyl finds him and beats him up with a garbage bag for having sex with Ethyl. While washing out the blood from his mouth with salt water, Dory finds out he has a strange craving for salt. To wash off the garbage he was beat up with, Dory takes a shower and he has a premonition of his pregnancy.

OC has an art show, where all the pieces are things to do with toilets, including a few pieces about the blue blowout Dory found earlier in the film. Dory, OC, and Tracy chat and OC reveals he has been having the same cravings and they go to a table to find the cookies from Corsica. Dory, beginning to not trust the cookies, says they have to be got rid of. OC leaves the conversation and makes an announcement that the final piece of his art show is a city project where he hands out white coats with the words “I'm Sorry” written on the back to homeless people. Tracy stays with Dory and throws the cookies away, saying they should not have been in the show. Dory suddenly remembers the blue explosion was in a toilet on Corsica's floor. Dory freaks out on Tracy and accuses her of knowing something about the cookies that they do not know.

Outside, OC confronts Dory about ruining his art show with his outburst and they fight about his art. Dory tells him the vision OC has about his art is a hallucination that comes from the cookies and they talk about some of the symptoms they have both had. OC sends him away.

Dory continues to do janitorial work but it is more dull than it was in the beginning. One day while cleaning Gary's office, Dory gets really sick and tries to call the nurse's hotline from the office phone. Gary catches him and threatens to get him fired and kicks Dory out. Dory stumbles to the bathroom where he gives birth to a blue fish. Dory watches it flop itself down the drain. Dory calls OC to warn him about what he thinks is coming for OC, but OC does not believe him.

The results of the additional testing have come back and Gary shreds all the evidence of the Semi-Aggregate Intestinal Fauna that forms in men as a result of the edible thermophenylene. He tells Tracy about the findings only after she signs an NDA. She is worried for the people they have been testing the cookies on without their knowledge and Gary tells her it does not hurt the men and rejoices in the fact that they are off the hook because the only people who know about it are her and him and the story is too unbelievable for the involuntary participants to tell anyone else.

Methyl has been having really violent mood swings and is fired.

Tracy calls Dory in the middle of the night when OC gives birth. The fish does not have a nose or mouth and died only after a few minutes of life. OC mourns and Dory wants to keep it as proof but OC flushes it to give it a funeral. While OC recovers, he regrets not having kept the fish and turned it into a spectacle. Dory says Ethyl and Methyl might be going through the same thing soon. Tracy speaks up and reveals herself, telling them that only happens to men, so Ethyl would be fine. She tells her she does not know anything else and OC accuses her of lying through their whole relationship and makes the choice to dump her after she has left.

Dory and OC go to Methyl to see if he is going through the same thing. They stay with him, ready to videotape the whole experience. After he gives birth, they try to catch it in a bucket, but it flops around instead which makes it difficult to capture cleanly on video. They eventually catch it and they keep it in a plastic bag. When Methyl tells them they should make holes in the bag so that it can breathe, OC and Dory tell him the death is inevitable. Methyl gets sad and Dory offers him comfort by praying for the thing, naming it Little Dizzle De Gusha.

While Dory and OC argue about who they should show the video to first, Methyl leaves with Little Dizzle to Jason's house, where Ethyl is staying, to tell her he loves her. OC and Dory try to chase him but they get pulled over. Ethyl tells Methyl she has been getting sober, which is why she has been distancing herself from Methyl, and takes him back but tells him to leave. Methyl never got to show her Little Dizzle and he gives it a funeral by throwing it into the sewer.

Dory and OC show the video to the doctor Dory had seen and he laughs them out convinced it was fake and a joke. Dory loses all faith in everything and announces he is going back to data and leaves OC behind. Dory goes to Corsica and uses his IT skills to find the Semi-Aggregate Intestinal Fauna file Gary had deleted. In the morning, Dory goes to confront Gary with the information but he does not say anything and instead takes his garbage and leaves. He throws away the file.

Dory goes back to the harbor where he found the bottle in the beginning of the movie and throws one in himself, but instead with the message, “I'm sorry.”

== Cast ==
- Marshall Allman as Dory, a religious IT manager turned janitor.
- Natasha Lyonne as Tracy, a product researcher at Corsica.
- Tania Raymonde as Ethyl, a janitor and the sister of one of Dory's former co-worker.
- Tygh Runyan as Methyl, another janitor, Ethyl's boyfriend.
- Matt Smith as Gary, Tracy's boss.
- Vince Vieluf as OC, the unofficial leader of Spiffy Jiffy.
- Jeanette Maus as Amelia.
- Sean Nelson as Jason Dory's former co-worker.
- Allen Johnson as the Preacher.
- Richard Lefebvre as Weird William, the veteran that owns and runs Spiffy Jiffy.
- Melissa D. Brown as Sheila.
- J. Maki and Jeremiah Leathart as the Cookie Testers.
- Lance Rosen as the Cookie Company CEO, the creator of edible thermophenylene.
- John Osebold as Crooked Stream, the other member of OC's band Pure White Turd.
- Russell Hodgkinson as Dr. Bergsman.
- Beth Andrisevic as the Hospital Receptionist.
- Agatha Nowicki as Fiona.
- Tony Driscoll as the Drug-Addled Art Patron.
- Toan Le as Wean-Naun.
- Ryan Bergsman as the Cop.

== Production ==
The film was distributed by VisitFilms and produced by Northwest Film Forum as part of its Start-to-Finish program. Sundance debuted the film in 2009 and Tribeca Cinemas screened it from May 12–18, 2010.

The film was written and directed by David Russo, a filmmaker from Seattle. Before Little Dizzle, Russo was known for making experimental short films such as Populi and Pan with Us, both of which had premiered in Sundance 6 years prior. It was filmed in 19 days and production only had three weeks before that to prepare. The screenplay was inspired by an experience the creator David Russo had while working as a janitor where he found a miscarriage in the women's bathroom and on the same night, also found pornographic magazines in the men's bathroom. The stark difference made him start thinking about how men would deal with that form of loss - a male miscarriage.

== Music ==
Music in Film
Artist	Song
"Awesome"	Adrift Clue Cell Song Memory Leak Requiem
Ceza	Rapstar
Neuraxis	Dreaming the End Oracle
Tiny Tim	O Come All Ye Faithul
Eric Richards	My Monkey's Dead Hit Man Blues
Cheneda Egawa & Michael Cozzi	Premonition of Fish
Michael Cozzi	Nature Vacuum
Krishna Das	Kainchi Hare Krishna
The Langley Schools Music Project	Calling Occupants
Huge Spacebird	Come Back Again

== Reception ==
=== Critical reception ===
On the review aggregator website Rotten Tomatoes, 89% of 9 critics' reviews are positive.

Stephen Cole of the Globe and Mail gave the movie a positive review: "In the cookie-cutter world of movies, it's a pleasure to come across a story you've never encountered before. Or ever will again. A film for which there can be no sequel". Jeannette Catsoulis from the New York Times wrote: “Throwaway jokes and eccentric visual effects… propel a story that weaves faith, creation and cruddy commodes into a psychedelic riff on sex roles and class structure.”

At Cinema Blend, Perri Nemiroff gave it a score of four out of five and wrote: “One part thoughtful and troublesome implication, three parts downright absurdity, The Immaculate Conception of Little Dizzle is an unusually wonderful source of dark comedy.” For Slash Films, Peter Sciretta gave it seven out of ten and wrote: "Little Dizzle is...the type of movie that's so strange that you're still likely to recommend it to your friend, saying ‘you have to see this.’"

=== Awards ===
- Fant-Asia Film Festival 2009 - Jury Prize for Best Director - David Russo
- Downtown Film Festival Los Angeles 2009 - Best Feature Film
- Sundance Film Festival 2009, Official Selection
- San Francisco International Film Festival 2009, Official Selection
