= Star Leaf =

- Official theatrical poster
- Directed by: Richard Cranor
- Written by: Richard Cranor; Hugh Berry
- Produced by: Robert Leeshock
- Starring: Russell Hodgkinson; Julian Gavilanes; Shelby Truax; Tyler Trerise; Richard Cranor; Robert Leeshock
- Release date: November 24, 2015
- Running time: 77 minutes
- Country: United States
- Language: English

Star Leaf is a 2015 science fiction film directed by Richard Cranor and starring Russell Hodgkinson, Julian Gavilanes, Shelby Truax, Tyler Trerise, Richard Cranor, and Robert Leeshock.

== Plot ==
The film begins with Tim (Tyler Trerise) and James (Julian Gavilanes) as Marine Snipers in the Hindu Kush mountain range of Afghanistan, on a mission to assassinate a high ranking Taliban leader. Their mission is soon compromised when a young child enters the scene, forcing James to take a risky shot that accidentally leads to the child's death.

One year later, Tim and his girlfriend Martha are on a roadtrip with James to La Push, Washington. Tim is hoping the trip to the beach will help James with his PTSD. They stop at a mysterious biker's house named Seth Guardrail Slaughter (Russell Hodgkinson) to get a map that will lead them to a legendary strain of extraterrestrial cannabis growing in the Olympic Mountains.

The trio use the map to navigate their way towards finding the "Garden of Weeden". Eventually, they find the ET marijuana, and Martha proceeds to violate the first rule of the grove - no cell phone usage that could give away the GPS coordinates of the sacred stash.

Around a campfire they begin to smoke the Star Leaf and experience a wide range of hallucinations and visions. James starts to hear voices - Afghan voices as his PTSD begins to manifest violently. Then, a UFO flies overhead. The group cannot tell if these things are real, or just side effects of smoking Star Leaf. To their shock, a forest ranger named Ranger Dave (Richard Cranor) suddenly enters their campsite as well. Joining them around the campfire, Ranger Dave proceeds to give an awkward and mysterious oral history of the Star Leaf, and what its spiritual effects are on those who smoke it.

Later that night, James is woken by mysterious orbs floating inside his tent. Along with the rest of the group, they experience multiple alien encounters that force them to flee the campsite. Soon it's discovered that Tim has stolen some Star Leaf clippings, a major violation of the rules governing the Star Leaf grove, and the reason behind the growing alien interference.

The group is split up - escaping into the woods James suffers multiple PTSD flashbacks. Ranger Dave and Seth Guardrail Slaughter intervene on his behalf, offering him an opportunity to redeem himself and his friends if he's willing to return Tim's stolen Star Leaf back to the grove, despite the Alien threat. James rises to the occasion, facing his most troubling fears and returns the Star Leaf successfully, allowing him to process fully his PTSD experience in Afghanistan and leading to much needed healing for himself and Tim.

The film ends with the group finally making it to the beach and surfing the ocean waves.

== Cast ==
- Russell Hodgkinson as Seth Guardrail Slaughter
- Richard Cranor as Ranger Dave
- Julian Gavilanes as James Hunter
- Shelby Truax as Martha DuPont
- Tyler Trerise as Tim Chandranatha
- Aleena Ober as the Feral Woman
- Svetlana Soutirina as Queen Cheeba
- Robert Leeshock as Gas Mask Man

== Production ==
Star Leaf premiered at the American Film Market and was part of the "Midnight Adrenaline" film series sponsored by the Seattle International Film Festival. Star Leaf also won best sci-fi film at the Albuquerque Film Festival. The DVD was released in November 2015 in the United States by the MVD Entertainment Group, and included information on the making of the film. The film is available in German speaking countries courtesy of Lighthouse Films.

== Reception ==
Pat Torfe of Bloody Disgusting described the film as a "Fun adventure, relying on developed characters and their interactions with some good humour thrown in...Cranor has done a great job on this indie ditty, and it’ll be interesting to see what he comes up with in the future."

Simon Weedn of Culture Magazine wrote "Star Leaf portrays a dramatic struggle for survival and self-preservation that is both unexpected and brilliantly executed".

The producers of Star Leaf launched their own cannabis brand in 2016, selling "ET Weed" in several stores in Washington state.

Using marijuana-like smelling hops, a dark Star Leaf IPA beer was also created by Decibel Brewing in Bothell, WA.
