= Jeanette Maus =

American actress

- Born: Jeanette David Maus; 14 June 1981; Everett, Washington, United States
- Died: 24 January 2021 (aged 39); Los Angeles, California, United States
- Education: Cornish College of the Arts
- Occupations: Actress; Voice actress; Writer; Producer; Teacher; Director
- Years active: 2006 – 2021

Jeanette Maus (June 14, 1981 – January 24, 2021) was an American actress, producer, writer, director and voice actress. She is known for her roles in the films My Effortless Brilliance, The Stanford Letter, Dismissed, The Immaculate Conception of Little Dizzle and Charm City Kings. She was best known for voicing Cassandra Dimitrescu in Resident Evil Village, released posthumously.

== Early life ==
Maus was born in Everett, Washington, and raised in Lake Stevens. She studied at the Cornish College of the Arts in Seattle, graduating in 2003. After graduation, she began teaching at the John Rosenfeld Studios in Los Angeles.

She mentored several actors, including Kerri Medders, Charlie Bushnell, Cameron Gellman, Quinn Lozar, Maggie Budzyna and Lisette Alexis.

== Career ==
Maus made her on-screen acting debut in the 2007 film Frayed.

In 2008, she wrote the film My Effortless Brilliance, which was directed by Lynn Shelton and screened at the Maryland Film Festival in 2009.

Maus also appeared in a range of independent and mainstream productions, including the 2020 crime drama Charm City Kings and the thriller Dismissed (2017). In addition to her acting work, she was involved behind the camera, writing and producing the 2018 short film Secret Island Adventure: Ripple One, and directing and producing the short Je Suis Ici the same year.

In 2021, she appeared posthumously in the film My Fiona, which was directed and written by Kelly Walker and shown at the Mardi Gras Film Festival on February 23, 2021.

That same year, she provided the voice and motion capture performance for the role of Cassandra Dimitrescu in Resident Evil Village, a role that brought her widespread recognition. She also voiced several other minor characters, including Roxana and Doll.

== Personal life ==
Maus was engaged to actor Dusty Warren, with whom she also worked on-screen with. They met during the shooting of film Your Sister's Sister.

== Illness and death ==
Maus was diagnosed with colon cancer in April 2020. A GoFundMe fundraiser was created by Warren to raise money for additional cancer treatment, including chemotherapy, in October 2020.

In January 2021, Warren published a statement announcing that Maus had died at the age of 39 due to complications from the disease. Her death was met with an outpouring of tributes from fans, as well as condolences shared on social media by Resident Evil developer Capcom.

== Filmography ==
=== Television ===
Year	Title	Role	Notes
2013	Those Guys	Jeanette	
2023	Stellar People	Hattie Clambake	Posthumous release

=== Film ===
Year	Title	Role	Notes
2007	Frayed	Kurt's mom	
2008	What The Funny	Jane	
2008	My Effortless Brilliance	Jayme	Writer
2008	Third Days Child	Jean	Short
2009	The Immaculate Conception of Little Dizzle	Amelia	
2009	Tell Me Who	Camera Store Clerk	
2010	Our Time Together	Judith	Short
2011	The Epiphany	Non Sequitur	
2011	Your Sister's Sister	Tom's friend	
2014	Walking	Jeanette	Producer
2015	Stealing	Jeanette	
2016	The Stanford Letter	Jeanette	
2017	Dismissed	Nancy	
2017	Ask Me Anything	News Anchor	
2017	Casting Call	Colleen	
2018	The Brownlist	Cynthia B. Franklin	
2018	Secret Island Adventure: Ripple one	PROG	Producer and writer
2018	Je Suis Ici		Director and producer
2019	Snuggle Party	Faith Ramos	
2020	Charm City Kings	Dr. Parish	
2020	Marry F*ck Kill	Lillian	
2021	My Fiona	Jane	Posthumous release

=== Video games ===
List of voice performances in animation
Year	Title	Role(s)	Notes
2021	Maiden	Cassandra Dimitrescu	
2021	Resident Evil Village	Roxana / Doll / Cassandra Dimitrescu	Posthumous release
