= List of Earth: Final Conflict episodes =

This is a list of episodes of the television series Earth: Final Conflict. The show originally aired from October 6, 1997 to May 20, 2002.

== Series overview ==
Season	Episodes	Originally released	
Season	Episodes	First released	Last released
1	22	October 6, 1997	May 11, 1998
2	22	October 5, 1998	May 17, 1999
3	22	October 4, 1999	May 15, 2000
4	22	October 2, 2000	May 15, 2001
5	22	October 1, 2001	May 13, 2002

== Episodes ==
=== Season 1 (1997–98) ===
No. overall	No. in season	Title	Directed by	Written by	Original release date	Prod. code
1	1	"Decision"	Allan Eastman	Gene Roddenberry	October 6, 1997	101
An alien race called the Taelons has come to Earth with the promise of peace. They seem to want to help humanity prosper but not everybody is happy with the arrival of the new "companions". Policeman William Boone (Kevin Kilner), already dealing with a personal tragedy, finds himself stuck in between both sides and has to make a difficult choice in his career and possibly his future.
2	2	"Truth"	Allan Eastman	Richard C. Okie & Raymond Hartung	October 13, 1997	102
Boone investigates his wife's death while feigning unswerving loyalty to the Taelons. Meanwhile, Boone learns what his CVI can actually do, and the consequences it can have for a person's identity. Note: First episode to feature Augur and Sandoval's wife. Note: Malin Åkerman's first role. Note: Episode nominated for "Best Sound in a Dramatic Program or Series" at the 13th Gemini Awards.
3	3	"Miracle"	David Warry-Smith	D.C. Fontana	October 20, 1997	103
The Taelons help a girl who has lost both of her hands (Emily Hampshire), but the experiment goes wrong and Boone must protect her from both the Taelons and the Resistance.
4	4	"Avatar"	Jeff Woolnough	Malcolm MacRury	October 27, 1997	104
A serial killer with a Taelon implant escapes from prison. He takes on the nature of a Taelon mythical figure. Note: First mention of the Shaquarva, in a different context than subsequent mentions.
5	5	"Old Flame"	Ken Girotti	Paul Gertz	November 3, 1997	105
Boone meets a lover from his past who awakens old feelings. Lili and Augur bring forth evidence that leads Boone to realize that the Taelons have implanted his memories of Alyse as part of the CVI he received in a subterfuge to test his loyalty.
6	6	"Float like a Butterfly"	Jeff Woolnough	Paul Gertz	November 10, 1997	106
A disturbance in an Amish community prompts Boone and Lili to investigate. After many Amish deaths that are all very dissimilar, they discover that an alien probe of immense power has been experimenting with tolerances of the local life forms. They contact the Resistance to retrieve the probe so that the first piece of Taelon technology can be studied. Note: First appearance of the Probe.
7	7	"Resurrection"	Milan Cheylov	Paul Gertz	November 17, 1997	107
Jonathan Doors, who faked his death to start the Resistance movement, comes out of hiding with a broadcast that interrupts the "World Bowl" of American style football. Zo'or is selected by the Taelon Synod (council) to replace Da'an as the American companion, but Da'an is reinstated when Doors leaks information about Taelon genetic manipulation. Note: First appearance of Zo'or and of the Resistance headquarters.
8	8	"Horizon Zero"	David Warry-Smith	Richard C. Okie	November 24, 1997	108
The Taelons successfully persuade governments around the world to stop space exploration; specifically a mission to Mars. Unexpectedly, the people of the world are not happy with the scrubbed mission. Three of the space pilots who were to fly to Mars, steal a Taelon shuttle; Lili's shuttle. Jonathan Doors facilitates promoting a side mission to utilizing the shuttle to go to Mars and gets pictures of nearby space on the dark side of the Moon revealing the Taelon Mothership as well as a base on the moon. Note: First appearance of the Taelon Home/Mothership.
9	9	"Scorpions Dream"	Ken Girotti	Harry Doc Kloor	December 29, 1997	109
A researcher (Jonathan Potts) steals a Skrill, the symbiotic weapon that the Taelons provide to Companion Protectors, after the Taelons decide to abandon the program. It takes control of its host and tries to free its children.
10	10	"Live Free or Die"	David Warry-Smith	Malcolm MacRury	January 5, 1998	110
Da'an is kidnapped by participants in failed Taelon experiments. The Synod is not willing to release the kidnappers' comrades from the experiments and Da'an wills himself to die to escape the captors.
11	11	"The Scarecrow Returns"	David Warry-Smith	Paul Gertz	January 12, 1998	111
Resistance members continue to study the probe recovered from the Amish village. It absorbs one of the research team members and tries to escape the lab. The team has to find a way to communicate with the probe before it is too late. Eventually, the Probe is recovered by Da'an, who appears to know about the device, while even Sandoval is in the dark.
12	12	"Sandoval's Run"	Milan Cheylov	Paul Aitken	January 19, 1998	112
Sandoval's Taelon brain implant breaks down. He escapes before he can be re-implanted, and finds his wife that he had committed. He leaves her to the Resistance to care for and returns to be re-implanted.
13	13	"The Secret of Strandhill"	Gordon Langevin	George Carson	February 2, 1998	113
The discovery in Ireland of an ancient Taelon artifact begins the search for the research of Ma'el, a Taelon scientist who journeyed to Earth thousands of years ago. Note: First appearance of Ma'el and Siobhan Beckett (Kari Matchett), protector to the European companion. Note: Episode won the award for "Best Original Music Score for a Dramatic Series" at the 13th Gemini Awards.
14	14	"Pandora's Box"	Tibor Takács	Malcolm MacRury	February 9, 1998	114
Rho'ha (Kari Matchett), a Taelon scientist, volunteers for an experiment where he is injected with human DNA, which makes him aggressive and homicidal. It is revealed that he was injected with DNA from Da'an's former kidnapper (Maurice Dean Wint), causing a psychic link between the two.
15	15	"If You Could Read My Mind"	Milan Cheylov	Paul Gertz & Julie G. Beers	February 16, 1998	115
A human invades the Taelon Commonality, the psychic link that bonds all Taelons. The race tries to destroy the intruder (Shauna MacDonald), at all costs. Boone learns more about Ma'el's actions on Earth.
16	16	"Wrath of Achilles"	Stephen Williams	Damian Kindler	February 23, 1998	116
Doors, Augur and Lili infect the Taelon embassy of North America with a virus which grows out of control, causing mass casualties. Da'an saves Lili's life when their ship crashes due to the virus. Sandoval and Boone attempt to restore order but it takes a visit from the Taelon Mothership to destroy the virus.
17	17	"The Devil You Know"	Stephen Williams	Raymond Hartung	April 13, 1998	117
The Taelons demonstrate a powerful new weapon that destroys technology. It is stolen and Johnathan Doors attempts to buy it from the thief. However, it turns out that the whole event is staged to bring Doors out of hiding. Lili finds out that the thief is her recently deceased father who was transferred into a new body by the Taelons.
18	18	"Law & Order"	Joe Scanlan	David Kirschner & Paul Gertz	April 20, 1998	118
Footage comes to light of Rho'ha killing a man. He is tried in a human court, with Jonathan Doors' son as the prosecutor. Zo'or is appointed to the jury to represent Taelons, and convinces the jury to convict the Taelon. Note: First appearance of Joshua Doors (William deVry).
19	19	"Through the Looking Glass"	Bruce Pittman	Malcolm MacRury	April 27, 1998	119
The real motivation behind Zo'or's portal program comes to light when Boone learns that humans are being taken to a secret Taelon laboratory, where certain humans are fitted with implants, and his own sister given a baby. The resistance attempts to send one of their own to the lab to expose the project, but they fail.
20	20	"Infection"	Milan Cheylov	Story by : Eugene W. Roddenberry & Paul Gertz & Julie G. Beers; Teleplay by : Paul Gertz & Julie G. Beers	July 27, 1998	120
A deadly virus from the captured Probe is stolen from a Taelon laboratory and is used by white supremacists to kill humans. The virus, which is deadly to both humans and Taelons, spreads quickly through both the Taelon mothership and Earth. Boone uses his implant to synthesize an antibody to the virus and saves both races. The Taelon Synod is tightlipped about the role of the Probe in the entire incident.
21	21	"Destruction"	Ross Clyde	Story by : Paul Gertz; Teleplay by : Mary Crawford & Alan Templeton	May 4, 1998	121
The probe has been relocated to Russia. With the help of Michael Sloane (Paul Johansson), a former decorated sergeant turned mercenary, the resistance launches an attack on the research base where it is held in order to prevent the scientists from downloading its data core - which could reveal all of their double agents. The probe self-destructs, but not before it makes a replicant of Rayna, which escapes. Joshua Doors confronts the Synod leader. Note: "First" appearance of Quo'on, the Synod leader, who up until this episode appeared only as an energy form on a viewer. Note: Episode nominated for "Best Production Design or Art Direction in a Dramatic Program or Series" and "Best Visual Effects" at the 13th Gemini Awards.
22	22	"The Joining"	Neill Fearnley	Story by : Paul Gertz & Jonas McCord; Teleplay by : Jonas McCord	May 11, 1998	122
Divers discover an ancient Taelon ancestor in a shipwreck. Inside the container is the last of a race that predates even the Taelons. However, he makes exact copies of all the people he encounters and wreaks havoc until Boone confronts him in the church where the resistance hideout is. In the firefight, Boone is critically wounded and the prisoner mates with Beckett, the Irish companion protector. Zo'or takes the opportunity to apparently vaporise Boone while he is in a medical tank. The synod chooses to remain on Earth, even with the danger from violent aliens such as the Kimera Ha'gel. Note: Final appearance of Kevin Kilner as a series regular.

=== Season 2 (1998–99) ===
The season was nominated for "Best Photography" (for Michael McMurray ) and "Best Sound Editing" (for Tom Bjelic, John Smith and Rich Harkness) in a Dramatic Program or Series at the 14th Gemini Awards

No. overall	No. in season	Title	Directed by	Written by	Original release date	Prod. code
23	1	"First of its Kind"	Allan Kroeker	Paul Gertz & Jonas Moisé	October 5, 1998	201
Agent Beckett gives birth to an alien-human hybrid that rapidly matures to adulthood. The child assumes the identity of Liam Kincaid (Robert Leeshock), an old comrade of Boone's. Liam is swiftly recruited by Da'an to be his new Protector, replacing William Boone. Da'an waives the usual CVI and Skrill implant requirements, but is unaware that Liam possesses a far more potent defense: the Shaquarava. The Taelon Synod leader Quo'on is killed by the replicant from the probe. It is learned the probe came from the Jaridians, with whom the Taelons are at war. Note: Robert Leeshock and Anita La Selva added as series regulars.
24	2	"Atavus"	Neill Fearnley	Brian Nelson	October 12, 1998	202
Augur accidentally separates Da'an from the Taelon Commonality and he de-evolves into an Atavus. Liam and Lili race to find him before bodies start piling up.
25	3	"A Stitch in Time"	James Head	Story by : Michael Berlin; Teleplay by : Brian Nelson	October 19, 1998	203
At an exhibit of Taelon items from Strandhill, Liam jumps through a Taelon portal which takes him two days into the future, where he finds everyone in the Resistance headquarters murdered. On returning to the present, he races to stop the massacre and begins to suspect that he is the assassin. Zo'or, attempting to destroy Liam, beams dangerous brain wave emissions to him from the Taelon mothership. Doors, highly suspicious of Liam, becomes agitated and demands that Liam be shot.
26	4	"Dimensions"	Brett Dowler	Story by : Paul Gertz & Jonas Moisé & Alan Swayze; Teleplay by : Alan Swayze	October 26, 1998	204
Liam and Augur are stranded in a parallel universe when an accident damages their shuttle while in inter-dimensional space. In this world, the Taelons reign supreme through their enforcer Kayla (the parallel Lili), and are opposed by a resistance led by Jason (the parallel Sandoval). Note: First appearance of Maiya (Montse Viader).
27	5	"Moonscape"	Ross Clyde	Story by : Gerald Sanford & John Marc De Matteis; Teleplay by : John Marc De Matteis	November 2, 1998	205
Augur is arrested for treason in Russia and condemned to death by hanging. However, he is blackmailed into participating in a Taelon experiment as advanced warriors and is implanted with a CVI. Maiya, having crossed over into this reality, confuses Sandoval for her lover Jason, the parallel Sandoval. Sandoval's interest is piqued, but Lili gets her to safety and gives her the identity of Isabel Martinez, Maiya's counterpart in this reality. Maiya reveals that Kayla (the parallel Lili) is her sister, causing Lili to wonder about her relationship to the real Isabel Martinez. Meanwhile Liam helps Augur break his CVI and bring him back from the rage. Lazarus (Shawn Doyle), the overseer of the program, was brought back to normal by Da'an.
28	6	"The Sleepers"	James Head	John Marc DeMatteis	November 9, 1998	206
A Jaridian probe crashes into earth and disrupts the Commonality, leading the Taelons to round up suspected Resistance members to be harvested for their life force energy to feed the draining Commonality. As Augur, Maiya and the others lie near death, their souls are in a dream world. Liam, in a comatose state, finds them and tries to bring them back, but they are happy in their dreams and refuse to return. Lili and Sandoval, meanwhile, locate the probe in Australia.
29	7	"Fissures"	Ross Clyde	Story by : Stephen Roloff; Teleplay by : Paul Gertz	November 16, 1998	207
Working on the New York to Bangkok interdimensional link, a technician is killed by energy-eating creatures. Liam and Augur suspect the creatures may be from another dimension, and will drain every energy source on earth. The mothership becomes infested with the creatures, leading the Taelons to put themselves into a near-death state to protect themselves.
30	8	"Redemption"	Allan Kroeker	Paul Gertz & Jonas Moisé	November 23, 1998	208
Beckett's CVI begins to break down, causing her to slip and fall while climbing in a cave. Unconscious, she hallucinates a trial for her crimes against humanity and for collaborating with the Taelons. Liam and Augur try to find Beckett before Sandoval finds and kills her. Although they are successful, Liam is too late to save her, but is finally able to reveal his true identity as his mother dies in his arms. Note: Kari Matchett's final appearance on the show.
31	9	"Isabel"	Ross Clyde	Paul Gertz	December 28, 1998	209
When Maiya begins to suffer from dimensional phasing, Augur claims that Maiya and her counterpart, Martinez, must merge or they may both die. Doors announces his candidacy for President of the United States in order toto challenge the Taelons. Lili confirms that Martinez and her have the same father. Sandoval questions Maiya on the mothership, while Doors and Zo'or discuss joining forces. Note: This episode was initially broadcast before the preceding episode, Between Heaven and Hell, yet clearly follows its events, which initiated the "Jonathan Doors running for President" storyline.
32	10	"Between Heaven and Hell"	Neill Fearnley	Julie Beers	January 4, 1999	210
Dr. Belman and her scientist daughter Joyce (Polly Shannon) inject an injured chimpanzee with a serum containing Taelon DNA, allowing him to regenerate his injured organs. Unlike her mother, Joyce is eager to try the serum on a human subject and does so on herself. Note: This episode was initially broadcast after the following episode, Isabel, yet clearly precedes its events, initiating the "Jonathan Doors running for President" storyline.
33	11	"Gauntlet"	W.F. Gereghty	Alan Levy	January 11, 1999	211
Lili is taken hostage as a Jaridian (Andrew Jackson) escapes from the Taelons in a shuttle. Liam pursues and both shuttles are drawn into an alien vessel. Liam explains that the vessel is a repository for the Kimera's accumulated knowledge. In order to leave, they must go to the vessel's core. Da'an confronts Zo'or about the Jaridian's escape, and challenges his authority. The Jaridian reveals his race and the Taelons were one until the Taelons separated. Now the Taelons want to force a union with the Jaridians by using humans as soldiers against them.
34	12	"One Man's Castle"	W.F. Gereghty	Marj M. Park	January 18, 1999	212
With Da'an's help, a handicapped scientist genius, Sparrow, heads a program where disabled persons can transfer their consciousness into a healthy body by creating a bio-surrogate with Jaridian replicant programming, and then live normal lives. A reporter (Martin Roach) sneaks into the lab and his camera flash activates a bio-surrogate (Mark Humphrey). Sandoval arrives to find the reporter and a guard dead, and the bio-surrogate gone having no consciousness of its own. Lili finds that Zo'or has tampered with Da'an's research and have programmed the bio-surrogates into killing machines. Liam learns that Sparrow has transferred his consciousness into a second bio-surrogate.
35	13	"Second Chances"	Milan Cheylov	Paul Gertz	February 1, 1999	213
A new Taelon project to rejuvenate the elderly draws the suspicions of the Resistance. The rejuvenated patients have had their memories altered. Some are turning violent. The North American resistance wants to replace Doors due to his high profile run for the presidency and offer Liam the position of leader. He accepts the offer for the good of the planet.
36	14	"Payback"	Vincenzo Natali	Story by : Guy Mullaly; Teleplay by : Lisa Klink	February 8, 1999	214
At the opening of a new Taelon portal station, a strange flash of energy radiates from Dr. Jeffrey Whitfield, Director of Portal Research, and he collapses and is found dead. Sa'al, the Taelon engineer in charge of the new portal, addresses the press about the safety of the portal. Doors argues with him and Sa'al explodes in a flash of light. Liam and Sandoval view video of both public events, they zero in on Arnold Creighton, a professor and outspoken critic of the Taelons. Augur finds that Creighton has invented a mini-teleportation device, which can kill from the inside out.
37	15	"Friendly Fire"	Vincenzo Natali	Richard Maxwell	February 15, 1999	215
While Chandler studies a stolen Taelon shuttle, two men burst in, and incinerate the lab while the shuttle escapes. Liam and Lili go to the site and find evidence that the attack was an inside job, pointing to a Resistance traitor. During a gun battle at a warehouse, Lili finds Chandler, who asks her to join him and take arms against the Taelons. Lili promises nothing, and lets him escape. Liam and Lili discover that Chandler is planning an attack on the Taelon embassy in Washington.
38	16	"Volunteers"	Ross Clyde	Story by : Paul Gertz & Lisa Klink; Teleplay by : Lisa Klink	February 22, 1999	216
A "volunteer" squad of specially trained Taelon implanted teenagers attacks an abandoned warehouse where a Resistance cell meets. Lili, Liam and Augur are surprised when Julia (Janet Kidder) shows up with an unconscious Amanda (Liisa Repo-Martell). Dr. Park (Janet-Laine Green) removes Amanda's implant and tells them that her implant is killing her. Resistance sends Julia undercover to join the Taelon Volunteer Program. Julia warns Liam and Lili about a massive assault, who mobilize the Resistance for a counter attack. Liam learns that recruits are being sent through portals after an unknown enemy in another galaxy.
39	17	"Bliss"	Terry Ingram	Story by : Sean Jara; Teleplay by : Gabrielle Stanton & Harry Werksman, Jr.	April 12, 1999	217
Lili becomes infected by a highly addictive drug called Bliss. Liam and Sandoval go to Ireland to investigate the drug's origin, where they meet Dr. Cox (Deborah Odell), and a cult of "Taelonists" who deny knowledge of Bliss. They discover a lab where none other than Ma'el worked on an antidote for Bliss, suspecting the Taelonists found the lab and are spreading it.
40	18	"Highjacked"	James Head	Story by : Carleton Eastlake & Gabrielle Stanton & Harry Werksman, Jr. Teleplay by : Gabrielle Stanton & Harry Werksman, Jr.	April 19, 1999	218
The Taelons hire a spin doctor who brings on a reporter onto the mothership. Unfortunately, the mothership is at this time hijacked by a replicant who wants to get the ship into Jaridian space.
41	19	"Defector"	Ross Clyde	Story by : Paul Gertz & Carleton Eastlake; Teleplay by : Paul Gertz	April 26, 1999	219
Two unidentified Taelon piloted shuttles appear, unscheduled, in Earth airspace, dogfighting. Liam wonders why Da'an took off to an unknown location. Sandoval is sent to locate the surviving Taelon, noted to be uncooperative. Zo'or disrupts Da'an's Karpag on the Moon base home world recreation. Liam finds Ba'li, who claims to have come to help humans retake Earth. Augur severs Ba'li's commonality link. Ba'li fingers Da'an as the architect of Taelon strategy across the galaxy to defeat the Jaridians, then devolves into an Atavus and moves to kill Da'an.
42	20	"Heroes & Heartbreak"	Jimmy Kaufman	Richard Maxwell	May 3, 1999	220
After Augur's friend implodes, due to an inter-dimensional space shard inside him, Augur meets a beautiful woman, Beverly Wu (Françoise Yip ), who hires him to engineer a weapon of mass destruction, called Forge, in Antarctica. Zo'or tells Da'an that the latest battle with the Jaridians has ended badly and they are retreating. Zo'or wants to activate the Forge to strike at the Jaridians while they regroup. Da'an is against using Earth as a base for attacking, but Zo'or overrules. Doors says Augur is in trouble if he's working with Beverly. Liam tries to get information on Forge from Da'an, who refuses to answer. Augur, falling in love, thinks the project may turn earth into a black hole. The worm hole between Earth and the Jaridian Empire stays open too long in between firings.
43	21	"Message in a Bottle"	James Head	Gabrielle Stanton & Harry Werksman, Jr.	May 10, 1999	221
A second Jaridian probe lands on Earth. The Resistance and the Taelons struggle to be the first to recover it and unlock its secrets. The resistance is captured, but obtains the probe. Liam is confronted by the real Liam Kincaid. Augur his captors argue about how to use the probe. The probe breaks free of the containment field and replicates Augur. The probe tells Liam that it will give the humans schematics to build an advanced communication device to contact the Jaridians. The probe is destroyed and the last equations were lost.
44	22	"Crossfire"	Ross Clyde	Story by : Jonas Moisé; Teleplay by : Lisa Klink	May 17, 1999	222
The Resistance is warned of the planned assassination of Jonathan Doors during the US Presidential debate. Augur contacts a weapons dealer to find out what kind of modifications were made to Talon weapons that were sold. The president is shot and Doors' son publicly blamed his father. Thompson wins the presidency. Thompson allows the Talons to take over the Earth in search for the resistance. Da'an is arrested by Sandoval. Lili prepares to blow up the mothership. Note: Final appearance of Janet Kidder in the series and Lisa Howard as a series regular.

=== Season 3 (1999–2000) ===
This is the first season to be presented in the 1.78:1 "widescreen" aspect ratio on DVD. Starting with the third episode, the DVD makers forgot to remove the television broadcast's "Dolby Surround where available" tag at the beginning of episodes.

No. overall	No. in season	Title	Directed by	Written by	Original release date	Prod. code
45	1	"Crackdown"	Allan Kroeker	Paul Gertz & Cory Tynan	October 4, 1999	301
U.S. President Thompson (Barry Flatman) declares a state of emergency and imposes martial law until the Resistance can be crushed. [Lili Marquette is arrested as she tries to blow up the mothership. The Taelons tell Liam that she is dead. Liam watches as Lili's body is sent into space. The president rescinds the Taelon presence on Earth and demands all arrested persons on the mothership to be returned to Earth. Doors makes a deal with Zo'or. Doors introduces Renee Palmer. Augur shuts down the Lili computer program. We see Lili still alive on the mothership.] Note: Jayne Heitmeyer added as a series regular.
46	2	"The Vanished"	Allan Kroeker	Cory Tynan	October 11, 1999	302
Lili Marquette's fate lies in Ronald Sandoval's hands as political allegiances shift around the president's declared state of emergency. [One of the "volunteers" releases Lili who leads her into an ambush, where she is implanted with a CVI. Lili's CVI is a camera. Renee and Liam team up to find the people who have "disappeared." Lili is put into a blue tank. Her physiology is changed and she now has black blood. Sandoval tells Lili he is saving her from the Taelons. Sandoval puts Lili into a shuttle and sends her into ID. Liam and Renee find all of the captives and release them.]
47	3	"Emancipation"	Ross Clyde	Howard Chaykin	October 18, 1999	303
Liam Kincaid and Renee Palmer team up to rescue the Skrill Queen, who has been kidnapped by an extremist resistance cell called Black Wednesday. [Liam asks Augur for help, but Augur doesn't help him as he is going broke, selling off his property and art collection, and is very angry. Renee tells Liam that Black Wednesday is responsible for the theft of the skrill queen. A skrill prototype is produced that allows humans to use a skrill without a CVI implant. It is learned that the Taelons conquered the skrill species and kept them in captivity to produce the skrill weapons. Sandoval finds Black Wednesday's hideout. Liam shows up at the same time. Renee and one of the cell's members get away with the skrill queen. Augur calls Renee a Capitalist Piglet. Liam puts the skrill queen on his bare chest and sees the Taelons capturing them. Zo'or tells Sandoval that the skrill homeworld is in Jaridian space therefore they cannot capture another queen. Liam and Renee puts the skrill queen in a jungle setting and the queen gives birth. The energy inside the queen flies off leaving her "babies" in the jungle.]
48	4	"Déjà Vu"	Brenton Spencer	Ethlie Ann Vare	October 25, 1999	304
Liam Kincaid discovers Taelon technology being sold on the black market is the cause of inexplicable deaths. [Mneme… "Relive Life at its Fullest" is a joint venture between Earth and the Taelons. Zo'or wants to supervise the Mneme project and Da'an agrees to accelerate the project. Zo'or asks Sandoval to increase surveillance on Da'an. Renee Palmer introduces Mneme as a hit. Liam suspects that Mneme is causing deaths. Liam tells Renee that he has five deaths from the Mneme chairs. Liam and Renee steal a truck with a bootleg chair. Augur is testing a chair. Liam, Renee and Augur find a disk w/someone else's memories. Zo'or has a chair and sees Renee's memories and probably Liam's also as his eyes change color and shape.]
49	5	"The Once and Future World"	James Head	George Geiger	November 1, 1999	305
Ancient Taelon artifacts smuggled into the United States lead the discovery of Ma'el's final relic: his ship. [In South America at the Peruvian Coast, a tomb raider finds a round baseball-like Taelon artifact. Zo'or immediately knows what this artifact is. Liam sets up a portable transporter to steal the artifact. Liam and Renee go to Nazca Plateau to track down the tomb. Liam finds the tomb, but notices that Doors' off shore rig is within eyesight of the tomb. Liam finds the ship and Renee holds a gun on Liam as Doors comes in. Doors says that with this ship Ma'el left us his world – the once and future world for human kind. The ship shows Da'an speaking to an Inca shaman and gave the artifact to him. The artifact is returned to the Taelons. Zo'or turns the artifact into something resembling a small hand held device.]
50	6	"Thicker than Blood"	James Head	George Geiger	November 8, 1999	306
In a shocking turn of events, Liam Kincaid is betrayed by Augur while Ronald Sandoval fights for his life against a deadly blood disorder. [Da'an hires a hitman to get security protocols and communication data on the resistance from Augur. He threatens Liam. Sandoval gets a memory block and becomes temporally clinically dead. The doctor tells Sandoval he is dying. Liam takes drastic measures to keep the resistance viable. Da'an turns over the resistance information to Zo'or. Resistance leaders are caught due to a fake message from Liam by Augur. Liam gives his blood to Sandoval so he can live (Sandoval is his father.) Sandoval recovers. The doctor tells Sandoval he had a boy.]
51	7	"A Little Bit of Heaven"	Brenton Spencer	Howard Chaykin	November 15, 1999	307
Liam Kincaid is framed for murder when he investigates the activities of a set of Taelon/Human hybrid twins (Reagan Pasternak and Max Piersig) created years ago by Da'an. [Liam finds out that fetuses are being taken from women by ID portals. Zo'or dismisses Renee's questions about invasive ID surgery. Liam transports to Taelonville, Indiana to do "research". Da'an informs Zo'or about his research on the twins. Zo'or tells Da'an that he doesn't want hybridization to pollute Taelon gene pool. The twins plant blood on Liam's pants from a murder victim and Liam is arrested but is rescued by Renee. the twins are growing hybrid babies. The female twin escapes with a baby. The babies are taken by the Taelons.]
52	8	"Pad'ar"	Ross Clyde	Story by : Paul Gertz & Howard Chaykin; Teleplay by : Howard Chaykin	November 22, 1999	308
Liam Kincaid and Renee Palmer discover Zo'or and Ronald Sandoval's plan to create perfect soldiers out of bio-surrogates to fight the Jaridians. [A customer of Augurs is watching a Pad'ar game and has a negative reaction to the "jack patch". Doors International make the "jack patches". One of the warriors dies in Pad'ar from a neurological condition. Liam tells Renee that the warriors are bio-surrogates. Da'an confronts Zo'or about Pad'ar bio-surrogacy program.]
53	9	"In Memory"	Terry Ingram	Cory Tynan	November 29, 1999	309
Lili Marquette awakens from a coma to find that the Jaridians have liberated Earth and the Taelons are gone. Something is off about Liam and Augur, however, and Lili begins to suspect that something is very, very wrong. [Sandoval sent Lili to Sector 5 in Alpha Centauri. Lili sends out and SOS and is answered by the Jaridians. Lili thinks she was in a coma and wakes up on Earth. She is told by Liam that she was in a coma for 3 years. The hospital doctor tells Lili that her CVI was removed. Liam tells Lili that he is headed to Jaridia. We learn Doors is president. Sandoval is executed. Liam brings Lili her dog tags, but they don not have the words "Find Me" on them. Lili cuts herself and has red blood. She realizes she's not on Earth. Liam tells Lili she is on a terraformed asteroid and needs her to fix a hyper-accelerator for the shuttle. Lili finds out she is on Jaridia and has fixed the shuttle for them. The Jaridian tells Lili it will take months to get to Earth.]
54	10	"The Cloister"	Ross Clyde	Ethlie Ann Vare	December 11, 1999	310
Liam Kincaid and Renee Palmer investigate a series of mysterious deaths involving the Cloister, a sect of nun-like women led by Sister Margarette (Marina Sirtis), who have the ability to spiritually bond with the Taelons. When it seems that the killer must be Da'an or Zo'or, Liam must race against time to determine the truth. Once the real killer is unmasked, Da'an makes a shocking revelation. [Zo'or attacks Da'an while he is sleeping, but Zo'or is only dreaming. Zo'or touches Sister Margarette and he gets "sick". Zo'or is showing signs of coming into a reproduction cycle even tho he is sterile. A shuttle explodes and Liam sees Da'an. Sandoval catches Renee looking for Sister Elizabeth's record of her time with the resistance. It is found out that the nuns joining with the Taelons are pregnant. Sister Margarette is found to be the killer because she could not have a baby. Da'an reveals that Zo'or is his child.]
55	11	"Interview"	Brenton Spencer	Story by : Paul Gertz & Cory Tynan; Teleplay by : Cory Tynan	January 17, 2000	311
A live television interview with Zo'or goes awry when a news reporter (Ellen Dubin) airs secret Taelon tapes and embarks on a deadly mission that Liam Kincaid must thwart. [A news reporter who wants Zo'or to do a live interview as something on her arm akin to a skrill. The news reporter is dying from the skrill. The Eli Hanson show airs videos of the Taelons since their arrival for the last 5 years. Zo'or shows up as energy then turns to human form. The audience and Zo'or are taken hostage. The truth begins. Augur fixes a slipstream portal and Liam saves Zo'or. Liam says that the world will think that Zo'or is a hero thanks to Renee.]
56	12	"Keep Your Enemies Closer"	Terry Ingram	George Geiger	January 24, 2000	312
Zo'or's political rival, T'than (Michelle Nolden) attempts to assassinate him by causing Liam's shuttle to crash in a remote part of the United States. Zo'or's injuries force Liam to make a difficult decision regarding his enemy's life, while also contending with the locals, a group of human who swore off technology before the Taelons arrived and therefore have no idea what Zo'or is. Meanwhile, T'than, well aware that Zo'or is Da'an's child, tries to convince Da'an to become the new Synod Leader. [At Sunlight Basin, Wyoming, Zo'or's shuttle crashes and we see the use of Taelon airbags. Zo'or has a slash in his upper body. The leader of "The Children of the Earth" refuses to get help for Zo'or. The news of Zo'or's disappearance is announced to the world. Liam tells the local they have no idea what will happen if Zo'or dies. Byron (the leader) has a global and sees the news report. Da'an tells Liam that in time Zo'or will be reconstituted. Liam tells Da'an that Earth people have a saying to keep your friends close, but keep your enemies closer.]
57	13	"Subterfuge"	Andrew Potter	Ethlie Ann Vare	January 31, 2000	313
Zo'or and Ronald Sandoval implement an elaborate plan to assassinate his rival T'than (Michelle Nolden), the Taelon War Minister. [Hannah is doing a fractal sculpture of Da'an. Sandoval plants a chip in a volunteer's skrill. A companion and the volunteer dies in a portal (ID space). Hannah is working for Sandoval and she promises she will get information from Liam. Augur is working with The Portal Authority to find out what happened to the portal. Hannah grills Da'an about becoming a protector. Da'an realizes that one Taelon can kill another. Sandoval brings the fake Hannah back to life.]
58	14	"Scorched Earth"	J. Miles Dale	Howard Chaykin	February 7, 2000	314
Liam Kincaid and Renee Palmer learn that the Taelons secretly inhabited the Earth during the S-I War and used a weapon of mass destruction to further their cause. [A Taelon ray comes down and spreads out like an atomic blast. The Quantum Vortex kills thousands of soldiers. Taelon embassies are being attacked and destroyed. The Taelon embassy in Washington is mostly destroyed by the Quantum Vortex. Da'an and Liam escape. Doors goes to Dennis (soldier in the S.I. war) and Dennis refuses to work with the Taelon technology. Sandoval interrogates Renee about the attack on the Washington embassy. Liam has technology that allows him to walk through glass doors. He downloads info from Renee's computer. Dennis wants to destroy the mothership with the Quantum Vortex. Liam confronts Da'an about the Taelon's interference in the S.I. war. "The strength of a civilization is not measured by its ability to fight war, but rather by its ability to prevent them."… Gene Roddenberry (at the end of the episode)]
59	15	"Sanctuary"	Michael Robison	Howard Chaykin	February 14, 2000	315
Liam Kincaid races against the clock to find Zo'or, who disappears after contracting an ancient Taelon virus that has the potential to cause a devastating plague. [An artifact unearthed by Sandoval's recovery team sends Zo'or into a coma from the Taelon virus Pesh'tal that has not been seen in a thousand years. T'than has assumed leadership of the Synod until Zo'or is cured. Liam steals a vial of the virus. Zo'or portals to New York with a case of amnesia. He ends up in a psychiatric facility. T'than takes Sandoval to task. A human is infected with the virus and becomes violent. T'than tells Da'an slaughter enough humans and they will obey. T'than makes an offer to Saldoval to kill Zo'or. Zo'or is beginning to break down. Sandoval tells T'than he will work with him. Mit'gai the healer tells Sandoval that it will be only a matter of hours until Zo'or becomes violent and knocks out a doctor and two orderlies. They become violent. Liam saves Zo'or. T'than and Zo'or have words about betrayal.]
60	16	"Through Your Eyes"	Brenton Spencer	Story by : Cory Tynan & Marcus Miller; Teleplay by : Marcus Miller	February 21, 2000	316
Zo'or transfers into a human body (Steve Bacic) to manipulate humans into banning energy weapons that pose a threat to the Taelons. [Da'an presents the Taelon interactive database of the galaxies. Da'an is almost assassinated by a weapon thru the virtual glass energy field. Zo'or transfers his conscience into a human body (the assassin Scott Pierce). Liam looks for Scott Pierce and his body is not at Saint John's facility. Zo'or goes to Earth and kills men in a bar. Zo'or is energized by his experience. Sandoval is concerned. Zo'or tries to kill the president's Chief of Staff. Zo'or is back on the mothership in his own body. Zo'or tells Sandoval to kill Scott and dispose of the body. Sandoval shoots Scott's body into space. Zo'or and Da'an change energy. Da'an feels what it was like to have survival instincts. Liam intervenes and Scott reconciles with his wife.]
61	17	"Time Bomb"	Ross Clyde	George Geiger	February 28, 2000	317
Liam Kincaid and Renee Palmer become trapped aboard Ma'el's ship when it comes alive and heads on a collision course for the mothership. [Renee is after the nanobots in Ma'els's ship. They cut into the ship and it explodes. The ship revives. Augur says the ship is repairing itself. Zo'or challenges T'than to a duel to the death. Liam goes into Ma'el's ship to rescue Renee. The ship thinks it's under attack and closes the airlock. Sandoval reminds Da'an that one Taelon cannot kill another, but Da'an says that killing by proxy is allowed. Liam and Renee find some cryopods. One opens and a human emerges. The human is a citizen of Rome (2nd century BC). The human says he has been revived 19 times. Ma'el wanted the human to be a judge of the Taelons. They are sentenced to death. The human falls and dies as right before the ship launches. Liam and Renee get into a lifepod before the ship explodes, saving the Taelons. The lifepod goes back to Earth.]
62	18	"The Fields"	John Stead	Cory Tynan	April 17, 2000	318
Liam Kincaid and Renee Palmer go undercover in the Church of the Companions and learn that humanity is being used to produce sustenance for the Taelons. [The Taelon volunteers are taking humans to the mothership from the Church of the Companions. Gina is one of the taken. Reverend Murray is the leader of the church. The reverend tells Liam that Gina is on a mission. Sandoval gives Da'an energy crystals. Liam and Renee go to a church meeting. Liam and Renee are sent on "a mission". Renee and Liam are fed a strange food that makes them sick. They are injected with liquid. They are making Kriss. Liam says that humans are the fields. Augur finds the facility underground where Liam and Renee are. The facility blows up, but Liam and Renee escape. Da'an tells Liam they have another way to get energy. The process has moved to the Moon.]
63	19	"Apparition"	Michael Robison	George Geiger	April 24, 2000	319
When the deceased Taelon Ku'don returns to haunt Zo'or, it is revealed that Zo'or is stealing profits from the Taelon co-ventures. Liam dreams of the death of Briggs at a bank by Taelon energy. Liam breaks into Brigg's apartment and the walls are filled with circles. Energy is coming from the circles. Liam sees Ku'don in a circle of energy and he is saying "exile". He finds a Taelon piece of technology. Sandoval threatens Priest at the bank. Zo'or is being haunted by Ku'don. Renee goes to work as a clerk in a bank. Liam is attacked by Ku'don and etched a circle with a dot in the middle on his hand. Zo'or tells Da'an that Ku'don is haunting him. Zo'or has a lust for money. Zo'or wants Da'an to perform a Hjarth'ra on Ku'don. Da'an refuses. Zo'or threatens Da'an. Ku'don releases Liam out of the bank vault. Da'an tells Zo'or that he defiles the commonality. Zo'or threatenes Da'an with exile. Zo'or transferred trillions of dollars out of the bank account. We see Zo'or has a vault with gold bars in it.
64	20	"One Taelon Avenue"	John Stead	John Whelpley	May 1, 2000	320
Jonathan Doors' fate hangs in the balance when his son Joshua succumbs to a mind-controlling device. A prototype shuttle is being launched by Dr. Sato. The pilot yells for abort, but the shuttle explodes. Joshua Doors tries to recruit Renee. One Taelon Avenue has a sophisticated Taelon A.I. monitoring device in the building. The A.I. turns on bio-purge function against Dr. Sato and kills him. Zo'or tells Sandoval to close the investigation into the two deaths. The A.I. program denies Zo'or and Da'an access to its functions. Augur finds that the building is changing people's minds. The A.I. is now killing all humans. Zo'or sends Sandoval to evacuate One Taelon Avenue to shut down the operational hardware. Sandoval destroys the A.I. hardware. Jonathan Doors dies. Joahua blames himself. Sandoval opens a container and Zo'or and Da'an freeze in their places.
65	21	"Abduction"	Andrew Potter	Story by : Paul Gertz, Cory Tynan & Howard Chaykin; Teleplay by : Howard Chaykin	May 8, 2000	321
Liam Kincaid retrieves an ancient Taelon relic and discovers that humanity is the genetic link between the Taelons and Jaridians. [Dr. Andrea Mazar is trying to decipher Ma'el's message. She turns a gun on Da'an, shoots him and escapes. **We see Lexa Doig from Andromeda (Rommie) in this scene as a volunteer.** Sandoval tells Mit'gal to keep silent about Da'an's condition. Andrea is remembering her husband's death. It is a false memory. Sandoval gets into a verbal fight with Da'an and says he will protect himself if anything happens. The Taelons find Dr. Mazar. Liam downloads Dr. Mazar's info to Augur while Sandoval Destroys Dr. Mazar's hotel room. Andrea is an expert on chaos theory and could crack Ma'el's numerical message. Renee goes to dinner with Andrea's husband and starts to have feelings for him. Renee and Liam tell Andrea her husband is still alive. Zo'or is questioning the volunteer that let Andrea escape. Liam gives the relic to Zo'or. It is found out that humans are the link between the Taelons and Jaridians. Both species will die if not for the humans. Zo'or says Sandoval will be executed. Zo'or tells Sandoval he will report to no one except him. Andrea is reunited with her husband.]
66	22	"Arrival"	Brenton Spencer	Story by : George Geiger, Cory Tynan & John Whelpley; Teleplay by : John Whelpley	May 15, 2000	322
Liam Kincaid and Renee Palmer find themselves in a life-and-death situation when they try to rescue the pregnant Lili Marquette, who has returned to Earth determined to give birth to her Human/Jaridian hybrid baby. [Lili's shuttle crash lands in the Antarctic. Federov holds an auction for a Taelon shuttle. Sandoval shows up and demands an end to the auction. Federov declines the request. Zo'or tells Sandoval to see Federov and put an end to the auction with money. Renee portals into Federov's building. Liam finds the Jaridian. Sandoval makes Federov a deal for 20 billion dollars plus one billion for Lili and the Jaridian. Renee tells she wants Federov to go public with the Jaridians and she wants 10% of the action. Liam and Augur find Lili's dog tags. Augur gets Lili's position from her SOS transmission. Sandoval has Lili and the Vorjak. Da'an senses Lili's presence. Lili is carrying Vorjak's baby and he tells Sandoval he needs Taelon energy. Sandoval wheels in Da'an who he previously froze. Lili and Da'an join hands. Lili is changing into a Jaridian. Da'an must be sacrificed.]

=== Season 4 (2000–01) ===
No. overall	No. in season	Title	Directed by	Written by	Original release date	Prod. code
67	1	"The Forge of Creation"	Michael Robison	George Geiger	October 2, 2000	401
Lili Marquette gives birth to a half-Jaridian child, with the help of Da'an's Taelon core energy, that may be the last hope for the Taelon and Jaridian races. Augur, hunted by the Volunteers, goes into hiding, but convinces Juliet Street, an old friend of his, to help Liam and Renee while he is on the run. Sandoval tries to destroy evidence of the Jaridian existence.
68	2	"Sins of the Father"	Will Dixon	Robin Burger	October 9, 2000	402
Liam and Renee investigate rumors of humans being forced to harvest kryss on the Freedom space station, Da'an turns out to be addicted to kryss. Liam teaches Da'an the dangers substance abuse can cause.
69	3	"First Breath"	John Stead	John Whelpley	October 16, 2000	403
Liam and Renee investigate Zo'or and his link to a biomedical facility's clandestine cloning operation.
70	4	"Limbo"	Brenton Spencer	John Whelpley	October 23, 2000	404
War Minister T'Than is murdered on board the mothership itself, leading Liam to discover the Taelons' darkest secret. Meanwhile, the late Jonathan Doors returns in cyber-form to administer a deadly attack upon them.
71	5	"Motherlode"	Brenton Spencer	George Geiger	October 30, 2000	405
While Liam and Renee investigate the suspicions of false imprisonment and infringement of civil rights, an ammoralist associate of Augur's plans to steal Zo'or's gold on board the mothership.
72	6	"Take No Prisoners"	John Stead	Marcus Miller	November 6, 2000	406
The Atlantic National Alliance manages to negotiate amnesty for all Resistance members, Liam tries to convince Resistance member Halley Simmons to take up the offer. Sandoval uses parasites to make Volunteers do suicide missions against the Resistance.
73	7	"The Second Wave"	Andrew Potter	Stephen Roloff	November 13, 2000	407
The Taelons decide to leave earth following what appears to be an imminent Jaridian invasion.
74	8	"Essence"	Roderick J. Pridy	Story by : Fiona Avery & Joel Metzger; Teleplay by : Fiona Avery	November 20, 2000	408
Renee discovers that her younger brother is a victim to Zo'or's plot to harness human emotions.
75	9	"Phantom Companion"	Brenton Spencer	John Whelpley	November 27, 2000	409
While on board the Taelon mothership, Renee is taken hostage by a mysterious being that haunts the most secret part of the ship: the nursery where Taelon children are kept in stasis until there is enough core energy to restore them.
76	10	"Dream Stalker"	Andrew Potter	Robin Burger	December 4, 2000	410
Liam and Renee investigate a serial killer who murders people in their dreams.
77	11	"Lost Generation"	Roderick J. Pridy	Jennifer Barrow	January 15, 2001	411
Liam and Renee discover that a baby is born with a CVI implant.
78	12	"The Summit"	Bruce Pittman	George Geiger	January 22, 2001	412
Liam is implanted with a neural surveillance device to track Da'an, who leaves earth on a mysterious final journey. Liam eventually joins Da'an on his quest: to attempt to merge with a Jaridian and restore both races to what they should have been.
79	13	"Dark Matter"	David Winning	Brad Falchuk	January 29, 2001	413
When the mother ship hits dark matter, the ship does not begin to heal itself. Zo'or is left in an unconscious state and Sandoval takes control. He decides it is time to liberate the Earth from the Taelons. Liam is told he must remove it with his long-dormant shaquarava by the last person he ever expected to see again: Ha'gel, his father.
80	14	"Keys to the Kingdom"	Andrew Potter	Robin Burger	February 5, 2001	414
The relic left by Ma'el is stolen from the mother ship. Zo'or threatens to destroy a major city if it isn't returned. Liam believes the final chapters contain information on synthesizing core energy.
81	15	"Street Chase"	Will Dixon	John Whelpley	February 12, 2001	415
Street learns a lesson in trust while on the run from Sandoval. Zo'or has discovered Street's darkest secret: she has the ability to think in multiple dimensions, and thus might hold the key to the Taelon's survival.
82	16	"Trapped by Time"	Martin Wood	George Geiger	February 19, 2001	416
The fate of the earth and the Taelons may be revealed when Liam and Renee learn of a facility where three astronauts from the future are being held. They try to learn from them what happens to the Taelons. Sandoval's wife is used as a pawn to gain important information from him.
83	17	"Atonement"	Brenton Spencer	John Whelpley	February 26, 2001	417
Sandoval goes to Renee to request a trial to testify to atrocities against humanity committed by the Taelons. A manhunt for Sandoval begins when he quits and leaves the mother ship. Liam and Renee are charged with safely transporting him from D.C. to Montreal via train.
84	18	"Blood Ties"	Martin Wood	Brad Falchuk	April 16, 2001	418
Strange assaults and several deaths may be related to a Doors/Taelon joint venture where Taelon core energy was used to heal people. It appears that the energy is being sucked back out of the patients.
85	19	"Hearts and Minds"	Andrew Potter	Story by : Brad Falchuk & Robin Burger; Teleplay by : Robin Burger	April 23, 2001	419
Renee is torn between love and duty when her boyfriend is captured by the Taelons. In the process, she learns that there is much more to the Taelon Commonality than she thought... or more to the human heart.
86	20	"Epiphany"	Will Dixon	Story by : Mike Goldberg; Teleplay by : Robin Burger	April 30, 2001	420
The Taelons decide to enter death stasis and hope for the best. A desperate Zo'or demands that Da'an share the thousand years' worth of core energy the latter acquired from his ill-fated merger so that the pair can guide humanity for another 500 years. Da'an, knowing his child does not have humanity's interest at heart, refuses. Meanwhile, Liam learns that he only has days to live.
87	21	"Dark Horizons"	Andrew Potter	Story by : Stephen Roloff; Teleplay by : George Geiger	May 7, 2001	421
After a Jaridian energy beam turns several Taelon companion protectors into assassins, Zo'or demands that they be turned over to him in 24 hours – or he will open fire on Earth. Da'an, meanwhile, dispatches Liam to take the assailants alive; and Sandoval becomes a pawn of the Jaridians who are intent on destroying Earth.
88	22	"Point of No Return"	Michael Robison	John Whelpley & Robin Burger	May 15, 2001	422
The Taelons' fate – and possibly Liam's – is decided after Liam and Renee find Ma'el's regeneration chamber. The discovery of the secret location causes the surviving Taelons and Jaridians to seek the mechanism, which promises to restore their draining energy. Street, meanwhile, solves Ma'el's final which will allow the Taelons and the Jaridians to at last merge again and save both races.

=== Season 5 (2001–02) ===
No. overall	No. in season	Title	Directed by	Written by	Original release date	Prod. code
89	1	"Unearthed"	Andrew Potter	John Whelpley	October 1, 2001	501
Renee and Street assemble mercenaries to find Liam. Unfortunately, they discover that the Atavus, the savage forerunners of the Taelons and Jaridians, have appeared, and they are intent on restoring their food source: humanity. Ra'Jel, the first – and now last – Taelon has also returned, and informs Renee that Final Conflict is upon humanity: it was Liam's task to lead humanity into it, and Renee's to bring them out. Meanwhile, the Atlantic National Alliance is eager to salvage technology from the mothership, but they must contend with its sole, vengeful occupant: Ronald Sandoval. Notes: the first appearance of Howlyn, Juda (series regulars), and Ra'Jel (recurring).
90	2	"Pariahs"	Will Dixon	George Geiger	October 8, 2001	502
Sandoval strikes a deal with the Atavus while Renee tries to convince Hubble Urick that the Atavus exist and need to be terminated. Street doesn't trust Hubble and thinks they should just lay low.
91	3	"The Seduction"	Andrew Potter	Stephen Roloff	October 15, 2001	503
Humans are brought aboard the mother ship for a joining with the Atavus to create hybrids. Renee tries to free Ra'jel. Hubble and Renee both become captives of Sandoval. Hubble is in a coma.
92	4	"Subterra"	Will Dixon	Mark Amato	October 22, 2001	504
Renee is still having trouble getting anyone to believe her about the Atavus. She meets a man who tells her that people who live underground are disappearing, due to the Atavus. They find a chamber used to make hybrids.
93	5	"Boone's Awakening"	David Winning	Paul Gertz	October 29, 2001	505
William Boone, the Taelon Protector who secretly led the human Resistance movement three years ago, is awoken from a state of suspended animation aboard the Mothership by Sandoval. He awakens to find that the Taelons and Jaridians have merged to become a new alien species posing an even greater threat to humanity and joins Renée's crusade against the Atavus.
94	6	"Termination"	David Winning	David Ransil	November 5, 2001	506
Renée breaks out a serial killer from prison, hoping she will be able to provide the information necessary to kill the deadly Atavus aliens, but the plan backfires.
95	7	"Guilty Conscience"	David Winning	Gene O'Neill & Noreen Tobin	November 12, 2001	507
A former Doors employee who has been turned into a hybrid tells Renee to stop a project just before he dies. The project seems to be an attempt to create Atavus hybrids faster.
96	8	"Boone's Assassin"	David Winning	Paul Gertz	November 19, 2001	508
Renee finds William Boone in the Himalayas and shows him the crystal found in "Entombed". She tells him that it can locate other Atavus hives on Earth. Boone rejoins Renee so that they may destroy the hives to prevent the Atavus on the Taelon mothership from reviving them. Sandoval revives Zo'or and turns him into a hybrid Taelon/Atavus using an Atavus corpse found under Antarctica. Zo'or's mission is to kill William Boone. Meanwhile, Sandoval attempts to recover the crystal from Boone and Renee. Note: this episode is set after the events of "Entombed".
97	9	"Entombed"	Brenton Spencer	Harold Apter	November 26, 2001	509
Renee and Street discover a pair of Atavus stasis chambers underneath Stonehenge. They take one to a research station in Antarctica where the Atavus inside, whose name is Gren, revives. After killing the station's scientist, the Atavus escapes with Street through the station's ID portal just before Sandoval arrives. When he realizes that the Atavus has gone and he cannot capture Renee, Sandoval destroys the station. Renee escapes and returns to the lair. She finds Street in the Flat Planet Cafe but Gren takes Street hostage and they travel back to Stonehenge to find the mapping crystal seen in "Boone's Assassin". Street recovers the crystal and Renee decapitates Gren before returning to the lair. Note: The events in this episode occur prior to "Boone's Assassin".
98	10	"Legacy"	David Winning	Stephen Roloff	January 14, 2002	510
An archaeologist uncovers an ancient tomb and portal where a female Atavus appears. Renee travels back through time in pursuit of a deadly female Atavus, who used an Atavus ID portal to escape her race's original doom and has been a menace throughout history. A monk follows Renee back to the present.
99	11	"Death Suite"	Andrew Potter	Meredith Muncy	January 21, 2002	511
After an incident where Renee fails to save a mother from an Atavus attack, she suffers PTSD and needs a break. Renee and Street check into a spa for some rest and relaxation but find themselves in a life and death struggle with the Atavus.
100	12	"Atavus High"	Brenton Spencer	Brad Falchuk	January 28, 2002	512
After he sets up a high school-based Atavus fan club, a disaffected teenager is used by the Atavus to recruit the world's youth into its army of hybrids. Renee tries to save his girlfriend and stop other teens from following him.
101	13	"Deep Sleep"	Brenton Spencer	Mark Amato	February 4, 2002	513
Renee is suspicious when a friend's wife and other patients become comatose supposedly from allergic reactions to anesthesia. She suspects Sandoval when she sees hybrids at the hospital. She needs an Atavus blood sample to find an antidote. Hubble awake.
102	14	"Art of War"	Brenton Spencer	Paul Gertz & John Whelpley	February 11, 2002	514
Tate is captured and Juda is injured in an attack on a military facility. Renee makes a deal with Tate to release him. He returns with Juda's body, which they study to learn why it did not regenerate.
103	15	"Grave Danger"	James Rait	David Ransil	February 18, 2002	515
Renee seeks the assistance of a former boyfriend Raleigh St. Claire, who is now an archaeologist as she attempts to follow a map she believes will get them to an Atavus stasis chamber.
104	16	"Deportation"	Kelly Makin	Mark Amato	February 25, 2002	516
A friend of Renee's is captured and taken to a government internment facility where hybrids are being detained. When she goes in to free him, she suspects he has an ulterior motive in being there. Renee has a change of heart and sympathy for her unwilling enemy.
105	17	"Honor and Duty"	Martin Wood	Paul Gertz & John Whelpley	April 8, 2002	517
Renee and boyfriend Lieutenant Michaels "do-the-right-thing" as they risk their own personal integrity in an attempt to secure plans to the one military weapon that can kill the Atavus. Howlyn finds Zo'or to see if she can control the mothership weapon.
106	18	"Bad Genes"	Bruce Pittman	John Whelpley	April 15, 2002	518
Renee's personal image of mankind's greatest enemy is forever changed when she becomes emotionally involved with a young Atavus child, Yulyn, who reveals he has a very human-like soul. Renee must now protect Yulyn, also a royal, from Howlyn's evil clutches.
107	19	"Subversion"	Martin Wood	David Ransil	April 22, 2002	519
Patrichio is broken out of jail, tried, and killed by a vigilante group called the "Preservationists" protesting the government's stance on the Atavus. Their next target is Renee. Renee is put on trial for opening an Atavus stasis chamber. She chooses Michaels as her lawyer for the vigilante trial.
108	20	"Street Wise"	Will Dixon	Paul Margolis	April 29, 2002	520
Street is drugged at the club and turned into a hybrid. Sandoval uses her to get information about a hybrid vaccine in development and raids the lab where it is being developed. Renee rushes to locate an antidote.
109	21	"The Journey"	David Winning	Story by : John Whelpley & Kathy Rudzik; Teleplay by : John Whelpley	May 6, 2002	521
Renee and Captain Michaels take one of his men to the pharmaceutical plant manufacturing an Atavus Hybrid vaccine to receive the hybrid vaccination, but Michaels suspects something a little strange about the lead scientist Dr. Spangler. Ra'jel leads Renee on an enlightening trip down memory lane to prepare her for the final conflict.
110	22	"Final Conflict"	Andrew Potter	Story by : Paul Gertz & John Whelpley; Teleplay by : Paul Gertz	May 13, 2002	522
Renee follows Ra'jel's command to go to the mother ship and Liam Kincaid reappears to help her allies in their ultimate battle. Howlyn closes in on the ship that brought the Atavus to Earth; the ship that just so happens to have the location of the Atavus homeworld and Howlyn's peoples in stasis. The captain of the Atavus ship kills Howlyn over the way Howlyn restarts the ship which causes it to go into an auto-destruct system. Ra'jel beams the stasis chamber to the mothership. In the end, Renee, Liam, Yulyn, and Ra'jel leave earth on the Taelon's mothership.
