= David Russo =

David Russo may refer to:

- David C. Russo (born 1953), member of the New Jersey General Assembly
- David Russo, American guitarist from Sun-60
- David Russo, a pseudonym for John D'Agostino in the book Rigged
- David Russo, American filmmaker and animator
