= The Hollow One =

2015 science fiction horror film

- Directed by: Nathan Hendrickson
- Written by: Nathan Hendrickson
- Starring: Kate Alden; Jesse James; Chelsea Farthing
- Cinematography: Connor Hair
- Edited by: Fred Beahm; Nathan Hendrickson
- Music by: Nathan Grigg; Brian Pamintuan
- Production companies: Compulsion Films; Abundant Productions
- Distributed by: 4Digital Media
- Release date: May 27, 2015 (Seattle International Film Festival)
- Running time: 100 minutes
- Country: United States
- Language: English

The Hollow One, also known under its working title of The Darker Path, is a 2015 science fiction horror film that was written and directed by Nathan Hendrickson. The film had its world premiere at the Seattle International Film Festival on May 27, 2015 and stars Kate Alden and Chelsea Farthing.

== Synopsis ==
The Wade family's members are Linda, Michael and their two daughters, Rachel and Anna. Michael decides to investigate his wife's past with the collaboration of his younger daughter, Anna, because he knows little about her origins. One day he receives a package of information about Linda, which contains a mysterious piece of metal, that when manipulated, opens the door for an entity that seems to possess him. A series of events during that night provoke Linda's death in a tragic way, being run over by Rachel's boyfriend, Matt.

Two years after these events, the Wade sisters decide to return home coinciding with Matt's release from prison, but everything seems to have changed in a town that seems to be abandoned and where its few inhabitants behave strangely. The remaining people act in a strange manner that may be tied to their dead mother's mysterious past and the strange object.

== Cast ==
- Kate Alden as Rachel Wade
- Jesse James as Matt Hoffman
- Chelsea Farthing as Anna Wade
- Tony Doupe as Michael Wade
- Tonya Skoog as Linda Wade
- Simon Hamlin as The Hollow One
- Dawson Doupé as The Hollow One
- Russell Hodgkinson as John Eaton
- Scott C. Brown as Stanley Jackson
- Anissa Davis as Young Laura Wade
- Richard Carmen as Carl Hoffman
- Jason Adkins as Jeff
- Willard Chase as Guy in Bed

== Reception ==
Screen Anarchy reviewed the film, commenting that "For a debut feature film it shows great promise for Hendrickson who, like only a few others, can seemingly move between videogames and film with ease." Bloody Disgusting rated the movie at three skulls, writing that "Despite a great setup, The Hollow One stumbled with falling into familiar territory with many aspects of its characters." Film School Rejects was also mixed in their review, which stated that "So many horror films follow similar, generic setups and frameworks that it usually comes down to how well the familiar is executed rather than how fresh it all feels, so it’s exciting when a genre film makes the creative effort to build something new. The Hollow One does just that, but its building blocks too frequently become stumbling blocks along the way."
