= Touchy Feely =

2013 film by Lynn Shelton

- Theatrical release poster
- Directed by: Lynn Shelton
- Written by: Lynn Shelton
- Produced by: Steven Schardt
- Starring: Rosemarie DeWitt; Elliot Page; Allison Janney; Josh Pais; Scoot McNairy; Ron Livingston
- Cinematography: Benjamin Kasulke
- Edited by: Lynn Shelton
- Music by: Vince Smith
- Distributed by: Magnolia Pictures
- Release dates: January 19, 2013 (Sundance); September 6, 2013 (United States)
- Running time: 88 minutes
- Country: United States
- Language: English
- Box office: $36,128

Touchy Feely is a 2013 film directed by Lynn Shelton and stars Rosemarie DeWitt as a massage therapist who develops a phobia to touching skin. Other cast members include Allison Janney, Ron Livingston, Scoot McNairy, Elliot Page and Josh Pais. The film premiered at the 2013 Sundance Film Festival where it was nominated for the U.S. Grand Jury Prize: Dramatic, and was released on September 6, 2013. It gained a mixed critical reception, and grossed over $36,000 in the United States.

== Plot ==
Abby, a massage therapist, develops an aversion to skin shortly after her boyfriend Jesse asks her to move in with him. She takes a temporary leave of absence from work. Her disgust begins to affect her relationship with Jesse, as she cannot bring herself to touch him or be touched. After Abby suggests to Jesse that they take some ecstasy she got from Bronwyn, she decides not to move in with Jesse.

Abby's brother Paul struggles financially as the family dentistry practice is dwindling and he refuses to advertise to attract new patients. When his daughter Jenny invites her friend Henry in for a routine teeth-cleaning, Paul is displeased. However, Paul manages to accidentally cure Henry's temporomandibular joint dysfunction and news of his healing powers begins to attract new clients. Inspired by the outpouring of enthusiasm from his patients, he visits Abby's friend Bronwyn in order to learn Reiki to better help his clients. After a disgruntled patient collapses in the waiting room while screaming that Paul is a fraud, his fortunes reverse and the other patients disappear. Upset at watching her father revert to his former self, Jenny runs out of the office crying.

Abby leaves Jesse a break-up note and moves in with her brother. She takes an ecstasy pill and wanders through a park. Her ex-boyfriend, Adrian sees her and takes her to his grandmother's home, while there she is able to touch him. Paul finds the remaining ecstasy tablet and he takes it while waiting for Jenny to return. He wanders through the city, eventually ending up at Bronwyn's home, where they kiss.

Jenny goes to Jesse's apartment and invites him to attend Henry's music concert with her. Afterwards, they go back to his apartment, where Jenny asks him to kiss her; he refuses, telling her he loves Abby. Jenny falls asleep at his home. The next morning, they are awoken by a knock at the door from Abby, who is able to hug Jesse.

== Cast ==
- Rosemarie DeWitt as Abby
- Elliot Page as Jenny (Note: Credited as Ellen Page; Page came out as transgender and changed his name in 2020.)
- Josh Pais as Paul
- Allison Janney as Bronwyn
- Ron Livingston as Adrian
- Scoot McNairy as Jesse
- Tomo Nakayama as Henry

== Production ==
Director Lynn Shelton's friend Megan Griffiths suggested the title after Shelton described her idea for the film over lunch. Elliot Page joined the cast after Catherine Keener mentioned that Shelton was interested in working with Page. According to Page, a large amount of the dialogue was improvised.

Filming took place in the Seattle area.

== Reception ==
According to review aggregator Rotten Tomatoes, 41% of 63 critics have given the film a positive review, with an average rating of 5.2/10. The site's critical consensus reads, "Well-acted but overly quirky, Touchy Feely is a tonally uneven dramedy with some interesting ideas but a lack of follow-through." Metacritic, another aggregator, calculated a weighted average score of 55 out of 100 based on 18 reviews, indicating "mixed or average reviews".
