= Sword of Trust =

2019 film by Lynn Shelton

- Theatrical release poster
- Directed by: Lynn Shelton
- Written by: Lynn Shelton; Mike O'Brien
- Produced by: Lynn Shelton; Ted Speaker
- Starring: Marc Maron; Jon Bass; Michaela Watkins; Tim Paul; Whitmer Thomas; Toby Huss; Dan Bakkedahl; Jillian Bell
- Cinematography: Jason Oldak
- Edited by: Tyler L. Cook
- Music by: Marc Maron
- Production company: Forager Films
- Distributed by: IFC Films
- Release dates: March 8, 2019 (SXSW); July 12, 2019 (United States)
- Running time: 88 minutes
- Country: United States
- Language: English
- Box office: $322,598

Sword of Trust is a 2019 American comedy film directed by Lynn Shelton from a screenplay by Shelton and Mike O'Brien. The cast features Marc Maron, Jon Bass, Michaela Watkins, Tim Paul, Whitmer Thomas, Toby Huss, Dan Bakkedahl and Jillian Bell. It is the final film directed by Shelton, who also portrays Deirdre in the film, before she died in May 2020.

The film had its world premiere at South by Southwest on March 8, 2019, and was released on July 12, 2019, by IFC Films.

== Plot ==
Mel owns and runs a pawn shop in Birmingham, Alabama, with the help of Nathaniel. However, Nathaniel isn't very helpful as he spends most of his time watching YouTube conspiracy videos on his laptop. Mary and Cynthia go to Cynthia's deceased grandfather's house in order to sort out his estate. Deirdre, a drug addict and Mel's ex, shows up to the pawn shop and has a conversation with Nathaniel. She writes him a poem as Mel emerges from the back. She tells Mel that he owes her a dinner and tries to pawn a ring. Mel declines and she leaves.

Back at the house Mary and Cynthia learn that Cynthia will not inherit her grandfather's house in contrast to their expectations due to reverse mortgage he took out on the house. They are disappointed and learn that she has inherited an antique sword with a letter written by the grandfather explaining the sword's history. Cynthia remembers the sword from her childhood. While reading the letter, they discover the sword belonged to General Sherman from the Civil War. It was surrendered to Cynthia's ancestor, a field marshal in a battle of the war. The letter also claims the Confederacy won the war.

The two women show up to Mel's Pawn Shop to sell the sword. He offers them $400. They tell him it is too low an offer, given its documentation. They show him a drawing of General McClellan surrendering to General Robert E. Lee. He doesn't believe them and Mary leaves him her number in case he changes his mind. Nathaniel finds a conspiracy video on YouTube of a man that believes the South won the war and claims he will pay up to $50,000 for Civil War artifacts. Mel and Nathaniel call the man to discuss business. The man asks for a picture of the sword.

Mel calls Mary to invite the women back and offers them more money. Mary is suspicious of the new offer all of a sudden and gets Mel to admit that there is a buyer. They come to an agreement to split the profits and take a picture of the sword and send it to the interested party. Everyone meets up at the Pawn Shop the next morning, including Hog Jaws, the man sent to buy the sword. Hog Jaws informs them that the boss man will be interested and that they'll be in touch.

Everyone except Mel leaves and two other men show up looking for the sword. They attempt to intimidate Mel and steal the sword that is not there. Nathaniel emerges from the back and Mel and Nathaniel's friend Jimmy comes in, forcing them to leave. They receive a text from Hog Jaws offering $40,000 for the sword. Mel accepts the offer and they receive another text telling them transport is on the way to take them to meet the boss.

Hog Jaws and the women arrive at the pawn shop. The car Hog Jaws arrives in is too small to transport everyone so he leaves. He comes back with a truck. He drives them from Alabama to a farm in Tennessee. The two men who attempted to rob Mel earlier emerge and attempt to steal the sword again. Mel realizes he knew the two men when they were children and Mary pulls a gun on them. A man, Kingpin, emerges from the barn with Hog Jaws, threatens the two men, and kicks them off the property.

Mel and Mary go inside the house in order to sell the sword to Kingpin, who realizes that the two of them don't really believe the South won the war. He purchases the sword from them anyway and admits he doesn't believe it either. Hog Jaws overhears the conversation from outside of the room they're in and comes in angrily with a gun drawn. Mary texts Cynthia who is outside with Nathaniel. She pulls out a gun and hits the man watching over the two of them in the head, knocking him out. She enters the room, points the gun to the back of Hog Jaws' head and takes his gun away. Kingpin's henchmen take Hog Jaws away. Cynthia decides she can't sell the sword because of the sentimental value and Mel, Nathaniel, Mary, and Cynthia drive back to Alabama. Mel pays for Deirdre's car to be fixed and leaves her a bag of provisions.

== Cast ==
- Marc Maron as Mel
- Jon Bass as Nathaniel
- Michaela Watkins as Mary
- Jillian Bell as Cynthia
- Toby Huss as Hog Jaws
- Dan Bakkedahl as Kingpin
- Lynn Shelton as Deirdre
- Tilcia Furman as Gabby
- Whitmer Thomas as Jake
- Timothy Paul as Zeke
- Benjamin Keepers as Ben
- Al Elliott as Jimmy
- Mike O'Brien as Yach

== Production ==
In May 2018, it was announced Michaela Watkins, Jillian Bell, Marc Maron, Jon Bass, Toby Huss, Dan Bakkedahl, Whitmer Thomas and Timothy Paul joined the cast of the film, with Lynn Shelton writing and directing the film. Production concluded that same month.

== Release ==
It had its world premiere at South by Southwest on March 8, 2019. Shortly after, IFC Films acquired distribution rights to the film. It was the opening night film at the Seattle International Film Festival on May 16, 2019. It was released on July 12, 2019.

=== Critical reception ===
Sword of Trust received positive reviews from film critics. It holds a 93% approval rating on review aggregator website Rotten Tomatoes, based on 92 reviews, with an average of 7.4/10. The site's critical consensus reads, "Expertly drawn characters and a strong sense of humanity make Sword of Trust an enjoyable – if a little meandering – journey." On Metacritic, the film holds a rating of 70 out of 100, based on 21 critics, indicating "generally favorable reviews".

Marc Maron won Best Actor for Sword of Trust at the Gijón International Film Festival in 2019.
