= My Effortless Brilliance =

2008 film by Lynn Shelton

My Effortless Brilliance is a 2008 independent dark comedy film directed by Lynn Shelton and starring Basil Harris, Sean Nelson, Jeanette Maus, and Calvin Reeder, all of whom co-wrote the film.

The film screened at such film festivals as South by Southwest and Maryland Film Festival, and was released on DVD by IFC Films in November 2009.

== Cast ==
- Jeanette Maus as Jayme
- Calvin Lee Reeder as Jim
- Basil Harris as Dylan
- Sean Nelson as Eric Lambert Jones
