= We Go Way Back =

2006 film by Lynn Shelton

- Directed by: Lynn Shelton
- Written by: Lynn Shelton
- Produced by: Peggy Case; AJ Epstein
- Starring: Aaron Blakely; Maggie Brown; Basil Harris; Amber Hubert; Robert Hamilton Wright
- Cinematography: Benjamin Kasulke
- Edited by: Lynn Shelton; Michelle Witten
- Music by: Laura Veirs; Jason Staczek
- Production companies: Geisha Years, LLC
- Release date: January 2006 (Slamdance Film Festival)
- Running time: 80 minutes
- Country: United States
- Language: English

We Go Way Back is a 2006 American film directed and written by Lynn Shelton and starring Aaron Blakely, Maggie Brown, Basil Harris, Amber Hubert and Robert Wright.

== Plot ==
A young woman who has just been offered her first leading role as an actress is confronted by the specter of her thirteen-year-old self. The dialog between the 23-year-old actress and her younger self begins in memory, and then climaxes in an apparitional experience with the specter of her own, repressed, precocious youth.

== Cast ==
- Aaron Blakely – Jeff
- Maggie Brown – Kate-at-13
- Basil Harris – Pete
- Amber Hubert – Kate-at-23
- Robert Hamilton Wright – The Director
- Sullivan Brown – Jeremy
- Russell Hodgkinson – Frank

== Production ==
The film began shooting in 2004 in Seattle.

In 2009, the company Geisha Years LLC was formed by Shelton specifically to purchase the film from TFC Productions 1, LLC, which was the original producer for the film. Geisha plans to secure a distribution deal for the film.

== Reception and awards ==
- Kodak Vision Award for Best Cinematography – 2006 Slamdance Film Festival
- Grand Jury Award for Best Narrative Feature – 2006 Slamdance Film Festival

We Go Way Back has been described by critics as "polished" and "impressionistic".
