= David Russo (filmmaker) =

American filmmaker

- Occupations: Animator; filmmaker
- Style: Stop motion animation; surrealism

David Russo is an American filmmaker and animator recognized for his work in independent cinema and known for his work combining live-action and stop-motion animation, as well as his surrealist style. His feature film The Immaculate Conception of Little Dizzle (2009) premiered at the Sundance Film Festival. Russo has also received a Genius Award from The Stranger and the Betty Bowen Memorial Award in Visual Arts.

== Career ==
=== Short films and animation ===
David Russo began his film career creating experimental short films that integrated animation with live-action. His works, including Populi (2002) and Pan With Us (2003), were presented at film festivals such as the Sundance Film Festival, Chicago International Film Festival, and the Tribeca Film Festival. Pan With Us was awarded the Jury Award for Best Animated Short at Sundance, as well as the Golden Gate Award for best animated short at the San Francisco International Film Festival. Russo's short film I Am (Not) Van Gogh premiered at the 2005 Bumbershoot festival. The short was broadcast on Canal Plus in Europe, released theatrically in France, and won the Grand Prix at the 25 FPS Festival in Zagreb, Croatia as well as other festivals including the Black Maria Film Festival and Clermont-Ferrand Film Festival. Filmmaker Magazine has compared his approach to animation to that of Michel Gondry and Jan Švankmajer.

=== The Immaculate Conception of Little Dizzle ===
In 2009 Russo directed The Immaculate Conception of Little Dizzle, his first feature-length film, premiering at the Sundance Film Festival. Russo was awarded the jury prize for Best Director at the Fantasia Film Festival. The dramedy portrays janitors and examines issues such as consumer behavior and corporate ethics. The story grew from Russo's own experiences as a janitor. The New York Times described the film as "an imaginative and quirky exploration of the bizarre," while Now Magazine noted its "undeniable originality."

== Selective Filmography ==
| Year | Title | director | screenWriter | Cinematographer | Actor | Animator | Notes |
|---|---|---|---|---|---|---|---|
| 2009 | The Immaculate Conception of Little Dizzle | Yes | Yes | | | Yes | Feature |
| 2005 | I Am (Not) Van Gogh | Yes | Yes | Yes | Yes | | Short; animation |
| 2003 | Pan with Us | Yes | Yes | Yes | | | Short; animation |
| 2002 | Populi | Yes | Yes | Yes | | | Short; animation |
| 1998 | Carried Away | | | | Yes | | |
| 1996 | Cityscrapes: Los Angeles | | | | Yes | | |
