= Russell Hodgkinson =

American actor (born 1959)

- Born: August 14, 1959 (age 67); Homestead AFB, Florida, U.S.
- Occupation: Actor
- Years active: 1990–present
- Children: 2

Russell Hodgkinson (born August 14, 1959) is an American actor. He is best known for his role in the Syfy television network series Z Nation as Steven "Doc" Beck.

== Personal life ==
Hodgkinson was born on August 14, 1959, at Homestead Air Force Base in Florida and served in the military before becoming an actor.

== Selected filmography ==
=== Film ===
Year	Title	Role	Notes	Ref
2000	Tony Bravo in Scenes from a Forgotten Cinema	Architect Tony		
2003	Big Fish	Some Farmer		
2006	We Go Way Back	Frank		
2007	Zoo	H	Documentary	
2009	ZMD: Zombies of Mass Destruction	Joe Miller		
2013	21 & Over	The Chief		
2015	The Hollow One	John Eaton		
2015	Star Leaf	Seth Guardrail Slaughter		
2016	Simple Creature	Phillip		
2018	We Take the Low Road	Frank		
2022	"The Stairs"	search and rescue member		

=== Television ===
Year	Title	Role	Notes	Ref
1990	The Court-Martial of Jackie Robinson	Juror	TV film (uncredited)	
1997	Orleans	Bird Expert	Episode: "Missing"	
2011	Leverage	Callaghan	Episode: The Boys' Night Out Job	
2011	Grimm	Ephram Geiger	Episode: "Danse Macabre"	
2013	Locally Grown	Wayne	TV film	
2014	Evil-in-Law	Leeman Jarvis	Episode: "Heaven Turns to Hell"	
2014–2018	Z Nation	Steven "Doc" Beck	65 episodes	
2017	Sharknado 5: Global Swarming	Steven "Doc" Beck	TV film	
2018	Love	Bob the Transient	Episode #3.3	
