= Lynn Shelton =

American filmmaker (1965–2020)

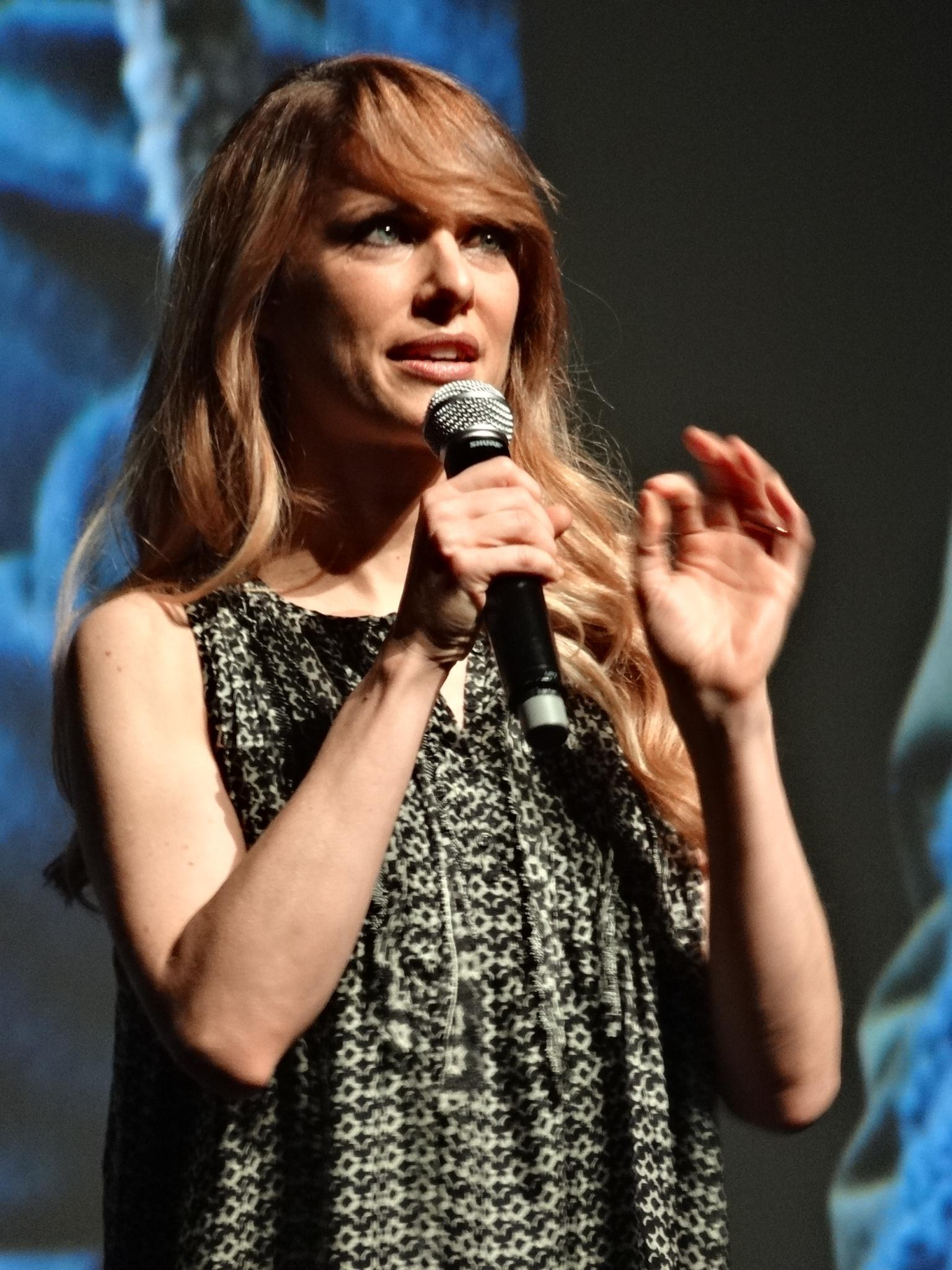
- Shelton in 2012
- Born: August 27, 1965; Oberlin, Ohio, U.S.
- Died: May 16, 2020 (aged 54); Los Angeles, California, U.S.
- Education: Oberlin College; University of Washington (BA); School of Visual Arts (MFA)
- Occupations: Film director; screenwriter; producer
- Years active: 1987–2020
- Spouse: Kevin Seal (m. 1993; div. 2019)
- Children: 1

Lynn Shelton (August 27, 1965 – May 15, 2020) was an American filmmaker, known for writing, directing, and producing such films as Humpday and Your Sister's Sister. She was associated with the mumblecore genre.

== Early life ==
Shelton was born in Oberlin, Ohio, and raised in Seattle, Washington. She described herself as having been audacious as a young girl, but having lost confidence in her creativity in adolescence. This experience contributed to a theme she explored in her 2005 film We Go Way Back.

Shelton attended Garfield High School. After high school, Shelton attended Oberlin College in Ohio and then the University of Washington School of Drama. She then moved to New York and followed the Master's of Fine Arts program in photography and related media at the School of Visual Arts in Manhattan. Her thesis advisor was Peggy Ahwesh.

She began working in the film industry as a film editor and made a series of experimental short films which have been described as "accomplished" and providing the basis for the "subtle, almost anthropological scrutiny" brought to bear in her later works.

Among the jobs she held to support her film career was working aboard a fishing trawler in the Bering Sea.

== Film and television career ==
Shelton had wanted to be a director, but was worried that being in her mid-30s, it was too late to begin. When she saw French director Claire Denis speak at Seattle's Northwest Film Forum in 2003, Denis revealed she was 40 when she directed her first feature film, and that revelation made Shelton realize that she still had plenty of time.

In 2004, Shelton began writing and directing her first feature film, We Go Way Back. Described as "polished" and "impressionistic", the film depicts a 23-year-old actress, Kate, confronted by her 13-year-old self. The dialog between the older and younger Kates begins in memory, and then climaxes in an apparitional experience with the specter of her own, repressed, precocious youth. We Go Way Back premiered at the Slamdance Film Festival in 2006.

In 2008, Shelton's dark comedy My Effortless Brilliance played at South by Southwest and Maryland Film Festival.

Her film Humpday premiered at Sundance, was acquired by Magnolia Pictures, and has been shown at Cannes, SIFF, South by Southwest and other film festivals. It opened in theaters in New York and Seattle on July 10, 2009.

Her film Your Sister's Sister premiered in 2011 at the Toronto International Film Festival. The film starred Emily Blunt, Rosemarie DeWitt, and Mark Duplass. When asked about exploring the relationship between sisters in a 2012 interview with FF2 Media's Jan Lisa Huttner, Shelton said:

Everybody has had that experience of going home for Thanksgiving and starting to act ten years old again because they're in the same situation with their parents and their siblings. So you get back into this rut again of who you were when you were first becoming a grownup. It's not until you get out that you can break out of those bonds, but we still get trapped by them when we return.

Touchy Feely premiered at Sundance Film Festival in 2013, where it was nominated for the Grand Jury Prize. It starred Rosemarie DeWitt, Allison Janney, and Elliot Page.

Laggies was the first film Shelton directed that she had not also written. The film starred Keira Knightley and Chloë Grace Moretz, and premiered at the 2014 Sundance Film Festival where it was acquired by A24 Films.

In 2015, Shelton was invited to join the Academy of Motion Picture Arts and Sciences' Director's Branch.

In 2017, her film Outside In premiered at Toronto International Film Festival. It starred Jay Duplass, Edie Falco, Kaitlyn Dever, and Ben Schwartz.

Her 2019 comedy Sword of Trust had its world premiere at South by Southwest. In it, Cynthia (Jillian Bell) inherits a sword from her deceased grandfather, which he believed proves the South won the Civil War.

Shelton has directed episodes for TV shows since 2009 including The Good Place, GLOW, New Girl, Mad Men, Casual and, in 2020, the Hulu miniseries Little Fires Everywhere, starring Kerry Washington and Reese Witherspoon.

Shelton described her approach to comedy as doing the opposite:

When we were on set, it was really essential that none of us—not the actors or myself either—think that we're in "a comedy", because that's when I find (especially with improvisation) you start reaching for jokes. You start sort of "soft-shoeing", and trying to entertain people, and I don't want that. I want us to just always be playing to the truth of the scene and I really have no idea how many laughs there are going to be. We're playing it so straight that it's really hard to tell the forest for the trees.

A week prior to her death, Shelton revealed she was in the process of co-writing a dramatic film with Marc Maron.

== Influences ==
Shelton cited directors Claire Denis, Woody Allen, and Ingmar Bergman as influences.

In a 2020 post made on her Instagram page, Shelton clipped a picture from the movie You Can Count on Me (2000), written and directed by Kenneth Lonergan. The caption she wrote—"I don't know if I could ever make a film as perfect and incredible as this one, but boy oh boy would I like to try"—strongly suggests that the film (and perhaps Lonergan) had a profound influence on her decision to become a filmmaker.

== Personal life ==
Shelton came out as bisexual in 2012. She was married to actor Kevin Seal, with whom she had a son, Milo Seal. Shelton was in a relationship with stand-up comedian Marc Maron at the time of her death.

== Death and legacy ==
Shelton died of acute myeloid leukemia at a hospital in Los Angeles on May 15, 2020, at age 54, after several days of ill health.

In 2020, Northwest Film Forum and Duplass Brothers Productions launched the Lynn Shelton "Of a Certain Age" Grant. This $25,000 unrestricted cash grant supports a woman or non-binary US-based filmmaker, age 39 or older, who has yet to direct a narrative feature. The grant's details are inspired by Shelton's own path as a filmmaker.

In August 2020, The American Cinematheque hosted an online tribute event for Shelton, featuring Gillian Jacobs, Kerry Washington, Reese Witherspoon, and more.

== Filmography ==
Films directed by Lynn Shelton
Year	Title	Notes
2006	We Go Way Back	
2008	What the Funny	
2008	My Effortless Brilliance	
2009	Humpday	
2011	Your Sister's Sister	
2013	Touchy Feely	
2014	Laggies	
2017	Outside In	
2019	Sword of Trust	

Films with acting by Lynn Shelton
Year	Title	Role	Notes
2008	Nights and Weekends	Mattie's sister	
2008	Moving	Leah	
2009	Humpday	Monica	
2011	The Off Hours	Danielle	
2012	Safety Not Guaranteed	Uptight Mom	
2013	Lucky Them	Lisa	
2019	Sword of Trust	Deirdre	

=== As film editor ===
- Outpatient (2002)
- 8 Minutes to Love (2004)
- Afternoon Delight (2004)
- Hedda Gabler (2004)
- Hello (2005)
- We Go Way Back (2006)
- Diggers (2007)
- My Effortless Brilliance (2008)

=== As producer ===
- My Effortless Brilliance (2008)
- Humpday (2009)

Television directing credits for Lynn Shelton
Year	Title	Notes
2010	Mad Men	Episode: "Hands and Knees"
2012	Ben and Kate	Episode: "The Trip"
2012–14	New Girl	5 episodes
2014–15	The Mindy Project	2 episodes
2015–16	Fresh Off the Boat	7 episodes
2015	Master of None	2 episodes
2016	Maron	2 episodes
2016	Casual	2 episodes
2016	Shameless	Episode: "Paradise Lost"
2017	Marc Maron: Too Real	Standup special
2017	Ghosted	Episode: "Bee-Mo"
2017	Santa Clarita Diet	Episode: "Strange or Just Inconsiderate?"
2017–18	Love	4 episodes
2017–19	GLOW	5 episodes
2018–19	A.P. Bio	2 episodes
2019	Dickinson	2 episodes
2019	The Morning Show	Episode: "That Woman"
2020	Marc Maron: End Times Fun	Standup special
2020	Little Fires Everywhere	4 episodes

=== As an actress ===
- Maron (2016): Sheila

== Awards and nominations ==
Award nominations for Lynn Shelton
Year	Award	Category	Title	Result	Ref.
2006	Slamdance Film Festival	Grand Jury Award	We Go Way Back	Won	
2008	Atlanta Film Festival	Special Jury Prize for Direction	My Effortless Brilliance	Won	
2009	Sundance Film Festival	Special Jury Prize	Humpday	Won	
2009	Sundance Film Festival	Grand Jury Prize	Humpday	Nominated	
2010	Independent Spirit Awards	Someone to Watch Award	My Effortless Brilliance	Won	
2017	Independent Spirit Awards	The BONNIE Award	Herself	Nominated	
2020	Primetime Emmy Award	Outstanding Limited Series	Little Fires Everywhere	Nominated	
2020	Primetime Emmy Award	Outstanding Directing for a Limited Series, Movie, or Dramatic Special	Little Fires Everywhere	Nominated	
2021	Directors Guild of America Award	Outstanding Directing – Miniseries or TV Film	Little Fires Everywhere	Nominated	

- 2008 – Genius Award for lifetime achievement from The Stranger newspaper

== See also ==
- List of female film and television directors
- List of LGBT-related films directed by women
