= Robert Leeshock =

American actor (born 1961)

- Born: Robert Leeshock; December 13, 1961 (age 64); Clifton, New Jersey, U.S.
- Occupations: Actor, writer, producer
- Years active: 1993–present
- Partner(s): Jacquelyn Mavrookas (2010–present)

Robert Leeshock (born December 13, 1961) is an American actor. He is best known in television for portraying the role of Liam Kincaid on the sci-fi drama series Earth: Final Conflict.

== Early life ==
Leeshock was born in Clifton, New Jersey. He attended Cornell University as an arts and science major, then graduated with a degree in materials science engineering. After earning his degree, he moved to New York City to pursue his acting career.

== Career ==
Leeshock is best known in television for portraying the role of Liam Kincaid on the sci-fi drama series Earth: Final Conflict from 1998 to 2001. In 2005, he joined the cast of the long-running ABC daytime drama One Life to Live as Bruce Bartlett, the business partner of Nash Brennan (played by Forbes March).

He trained as an actor with Wynn Handman, director of The American Place Theater. He has penned the screenplay Yo Yo Boy as well as characters for stand up venues in New York and Los Angeles. In addition to acting, he works as a professional photographer from his studio in New York City and produces projects for both film and television. In 2010, Leeshock appeared on United States television in commercials for Zegerid OTC. In early 2012, he both executive produced and starred in the short film GodMachine, which also features his former Earth: Final Conflict co-star Von Flores.

== Biography ==
A native from New Jersey, Leeshock's ethnic background is a mix of Polish, Czech, English, Irish and Italian. He moved to New York in the early 1980s after his high school studies.

He first enrolled as an Arts and Science major at Cornell University. He transferred to engineering before the second semester of Junior year, even though his adviser urged him not to do so. But it didn't take long for him to find himself struggling in that field. Yet he managed to complete his degree in materials science engineering and electrical engineering (in semiconductor electronics and the electrical properties of materials in silicon wafers) but decided not to work as an engineer.

Leeshock was left undecided about what profession to choose. He didn't know yet that acting was a profession. One of his friend from college was a liberal arts major and taking acting class. That fascinated him. Theater was unknown to him and becoming a movie star wasn't his goal. To learn more about acting as a profession, he got a job at a restaurant to study actors and comprehend them. He viewed this as the beginning of his training. Hoping to regain both his Arts and Sciences sensibilities he became an actor after theater training in New York. He thought this could be a nice way to learn about himself. It took him two and half years to realize he was an actor, rather than a personality.

In New York, Leeshock took training classes in scene study with Wynn Handman, director of The American Place Theater. He also trained in the Meisner technique, in comedy improvisation and in voice. His other activities included waiting tables, doing commercials and performing in theater productions.

He performed with several theater companies, including The Complex, West Bank Cafe (where he also created original characters), SoHo Repertory, The (Samuel) Beckett Theatre and The Actors Factory. He wrote the screenplay Yo Yo Boy and created characters for stand up comedies in New York and Los Angeles. He lived in L.A. for three years, from 1993 to 1996, where he pursued acting in theatre (at The Complex) and wrote a one-man show.

After Beverly Hills 90210, he left L.A. for Mexico where he stayed seven months. It was for the filming of the TV series Empire (the American version of the telenovella Imperio de Cristal), which never aired. Then he returned to L.A. where he started writing a semi-autobiographical one-man show about life experiences.

Leeshock's first onscreen acting role was in the daytime drama Loving. He has appeared in over 30 commercials (such as Zegerid OTC and Colace), in the prime time drama series Beverly Hills 90210, in soap operas (including All My Children, Guiding Light, and Another World), in Empire and in the independent film Elysian Fields.

He auditioned in Los Angeles for Gene Roddenberry's Earth: Final Conflict with Lisa Howard for Jonas McCord (executive producer and writer), then met Paul Gertz (also executive producer writer). They were both pleased with his performance. He joined the cast in the second season (1998) as Liam Kincaid (a human-Kimera hybrid), replacing Kevin Kilner as the lead actor. This is the role for which he is most famous. After two seasons in the series, Leeshock was comfortable in his role but found playing a lead character exhaustive and a huge responsibility. He was released from the series as a business decision to minimize production costs; television producers pay less tax when they use Canadian actors. He left after the fourth season to return for the series finale in season 5.

After Earth: Final Conflict, he appeared in other soap operas (As the World Turns and One Life to Live).

His first work as a producer was with the short film Godmachine. The head writer who came up with the idea is Richard Cranor. They have a mutual friend who suggested that Leeshock read the first draft of the script. He and his friend Scott Gunderson (actor and writer) worked over the script. Then he gathered other members for his team. They produced a short version of the film and want to make a movie from it.

With Richard Cranor, he founded Titan Sky Entertainment in March 2012. Leeshock (executive producer and writer), Richard Cranor (writer, producer and director) and Kiki Yeung (actress and producer) attended The American Film Market (AFM) in November 2013. They presented GodMachine and other projects.

Besides being an actor, a writer and a producer, Leeshock works as a professional photographer from his studio (Robert Leeshock Photography, established in June 2009) in New York and New Jersey creating projects for film and television. He specializes in family portraits, weddings, events, actors' headshots and commercial print.

He is also an athlete (he played lacrosse for Cornell), salsa dancer and singer. He currently lives in New York, has one brother and three sisters. His girlfriend is Jacquelyn Mavrookas. They met in 2010.

== Associations ==
Leeshock joined the Phi Kappa Psi fraternity at Cornell University, and through that organization, the Irving Literary Society.

== Filmography ==
Actor
Year	Film	Role	Other notes
2014	Surrender	Clay	
2013	Scavenger Killers	Phil Chaney	
2012	Come As You Are	Coach Randle	Short film
2012	GodMachine	Sgt. John Lee	Short film
2012	The Dead Reckoning	Seth Granger	
2011	3 Weeks to Daytona	Buddy	
2009	Law & Order: Criminal Intent	Kip McGonagle	Episode: "All In"
2004–2006	One Life to Live	Bruce Bartlett	5 episodes
2004	As the World Turns	Alan Drake	Unknown episodes
2004	Walk Away	Tim Johnson	
2004	Dead End Road	Larry LeShockre	
1998–2002	Earth: Final Conflict	Liam Kincaid	67 episodes
1998	Guiding Light	Eddie Banks	6 episodes
1997	Life's Work	Jeff	Episode: "Dates"
1995	Empire	James Lambert	TV movie
1993–1994	Beverly Hills, 90210	Keith Christopher	8 episodes
1993	Me and Veronica	Jimmy	
1993	Elysian Fields	Albert Turner	Short film
1992	All My Children	Jay	
1983	Loving	Monty	Unknown episodes
