= List of Stranger Genius Awards winners =

The Stranger Genius Awards, given by Seattle alternative weekly newspaper The Stranger, "bring attention to, and recognize the contributions of, ... outstanding artists in Seattle." Winners are notified by receiving a chocolate cake bearing the message "You're a Friggin' Genius!"

The event is generally taking place in autumn.

Stranger Genius Award winners
Person or organization	Category	Image	Year
Susan Robb	Visual Art		2003
Web Crowell	Film		2003
Matt Briggs	Literature		2003
Chris Jeffries	Theater		2003
Velocity Dance Center	Organization		2003
Vital 5	Organization		2003
Victoria Haven	Visual Art		2004
David Russo	Film		2004
John Olson	Literature		2004
Sarah Rudinoff	Theater		2004
Seattle School	Organization		2004
SuttonBeresCuller	Visual Art		2005
Michael Seiwerath	Film		2005
Rebecca Brown	Literature		2005
Gabriel Baron	Theater		2005
Frye Art Museum	Organization		2005
Lead Pencil Studio	Visual Art		2006
James Longley	Film		2006
Jonathan Raban	Literature		2006
Jennifer Zeyl	Theater		2006
On the Boards	Organization		2006
Alex Schweder	Visual Art		2007
Linas Phillips	Film		2007
Heather McHugh	Literature		2007
Cary Moon	Politics		2007
Amy Thone	Theater		2007
Strawberry Theatre Workshop	Organization		2007
Wynne Greenwood	Visual Art		2008
Lynn Shelton	Film		2008
Sherman Alexie	Literature		2008
Paul Mullin	Theater		2008
Implied Violence	Organization		2008
Jeffry Mitchell	Visual Art		2009
Zia Mohajerjasbi	Film		2009
Stacey Levine	Literature		2009
The Cody Rivers Show	Theater		2009
Pacific Northwest Ballet	Organization		2009
Susie Lee	Visual Art		2010
Charles Mudede and Robinson Devor	Film		2010
Jim Woodring	Literature		2010
Shabazz Palaces	Music		2010
Marya Sea Kaminski	Theater		2010
DK Pan	Visual Art		2011
Gary Hill	Film		2011
Lesley Hazleton	Literature		2011
The Intelligence	Music		2011
John Osebold	Theater		2011
Sarah Bergmann	Visual Art		2012
Megan Griffiths	Film		2012
Ellen Forney	Literature		2012
Lori Goldston	Music		2012
Grady West	Theater		2012
Zoe Scofield & Juniper Shuey	Performance		2013
Eyvind Kang & Jessika Kenney	Music		2013
Rodrigo Valenzuela	Visual Art		2013
Maged Zaher	Literature		2013
Benjamin Kasulke	Film		2013
Valerie Curtis-Newton	Performance		2014
Industrial Revelation	Music		2014
C. Davida Ingram	Visual Art		2014
Gary Groth	Literature		2014
Drew Christie	Film		2014
Yussef El Guindi	Literature		2015
Steve Fisk	Music		2015
Mary Ann Peters	Visual Art		2015
Scarecrow Project			2015
Cherdonna Shinatra	Performance		2015
Barbara Earl Thomas	Art		2016
Tracy Rector	Film		2016
Lindy West	Literature		2016
Erik Blood	Music		2016
Emily Chisholm	Performance		2016

Source for list: The Stranger Genius Awards: The Event, thestranger.com. Accessed online 2016-10-07. 2016 winners from "We Saw You Dancing, Drinking, Cheering, Crying, and Winning Thousands of Dollars at the Stranger Genius Awards", thestranger.com. Accessed online 2016-10-07.
