= Kurt Cobain Memorial Park =

Memorial to Kurt Cobain in his hometown of Aberdeen, Washington

- Interactive map of Kurt Cobain Memorial Park
- Type: City park
- Location: Wishkah River riverfront, Felony Flats, Aberdeen, Washington, U.S.
- Coordinates: 46.9840°N 123.8055°W
- Created: 2011
- Operator: Aberdeen Parks Dept.

Kurt Cobain Memorial Park (also called Kurt Cobain Landing) is a park in Aberdeen, Washington and the first official, full-scale memorial to Nirvana frontman Kurt Cobain in his hometown.

A welcome sign to the city installed in 2005 which obliquely says "Come As You Are", but does not mention Cobain by name, was the first official recognition of the musician who died by suicide in April 1994. The Memorial Park, initially built in Felony Flats on city-owned land near his Aberdeen home in 2011, and maintained by local volunteers as Kurt Cobain Landing, was adopted by the city of Aberdeen in 2015, 21 years after his death. As recently as 2011, a motion not to rename the adjacent Young Street Bridge after Cobain was applauded at a city council meeting.

The lyrics of the Nirvana song "Something in the Way" are about the Young Street Bridge. The lyrics to the song are etched on an aluminum plaque posted in the park.

A granite memorial headstone inscribed with Cobain quotes rests in the park. Part of one of the quotes was sandblasted away because the city mayor found the phrase "[drugs] will fuck you up" offensive.

Cobain immortalized the bridge through music, but now the bridge immortalizes Cobain.

— Rachel Thomson, Grays Harbor Talk, July 15, 2014

Aberdeen’s must-see Cobain site is a small park, opened in 2011 by the Kurt Cobain Memorial Foundation, called Kurt Cobain Landing, which sits at the foot of the Young Street Bridge, the inspiration for the song "Something in the Way." Cobain claimed that he lived under the bridge for a time, and while most who knew him don’t think he did, it was clearly one of his preferred hangouts. Set along the banks of the murky Wishkah River, the strangely appealing little park features a guitar sculpture, a likeness of Cobain with the lyrics to "Something in the Way," a headstone with some amusing Cobain quotes (sample: "I’m a walking bacterial infection"), a Kurt Cobain "air guitar" sculpture and a collage of Nirvana-related graffiti under the bridge itself.

— Dave Seminara, The New York Times, March 25, 2014

== See also ==
- Viretta Park, a city park with an unofficial memorial to Cobain near his Seattle home
