= C. Davida Ingram =

Conceptual artist

C. Davida Ingram is a conceptual artist specializing in gender, race and social practice. Her art explores desire, space, time and memory, while questioning 21st century black female subjectivity. She is also a public speaker and civic leader. She received the 2014 Stranger Genius Award in Visual Arts. In 2016 she was a Kennedy Center Citizen Art Fellow, a finalist for the 2016 Neddy Arts Award, and 2018 Jacob Lawrence Fellow. Ingram, along with Prometheus Brown of Blue Scholars, and Tony-nominated choreographer and director, Donald Byrd at the 2016 Crosscut Arts Salon: The Color of Race. In 2017 she was featured in Seattle Magazine's Most Influential Seattleites of 2017. In the same year she received the Mona Marita Dingus Award for Innovative Media.

Ingram has worked at Seattle Art Museum founding their Teen Programs. Thereafter, she joined the museum educators at the Gates Foundations Visitor Center developing public programs on global health and development. She continued on to have a tenure at the Seattle Public Library inaugurating their Public Engagement programming focused on working with communities most affected by racism to produce knowledge at The Library with a focus on civics and creativity. Ingram led the City of Seattle's Race and Social Justice Initiative from 2022 to 2023. She is currently the first executive director for SAARC (Seattle/ King County African American Reparations Committee).

Throughout her career she has engaged in institutional change making to create public benefit for all with a focus on inclusivity, intersectionality, and intergenerational understanding.

Her work has been exhibited widely, including at Frye Art Museum, the Northwest African American Museum, the Intiman Theatre, Bridge Productions, WaNaWari, Tacoma Art Museum, and the Jacob Lawrence Gallery at the University of Washington.

Davida's interest in art began when her father taught her how to draw a face.

Her work has a post-modern sensibility because she is particularly influenced by theory and cultural studies.
