= Shuey =

Shuey is a surname. Notable people with the surname include:

- Audrey M. Shuey (1900–1977), American psychologist and writer
- Bill Shuey (born 1974), American football coach and former defensive back
- Juniper Shuey (born 1974), American visual artist
- Luke Shuey (born 1990), Australian rules footballer
- Michael Shuey (born 1994), American track and field athlete
- Paul Shuey (born 1970), American former professional baseball player
