= Viretta Park =

Park in Seattle, Washington; memorial to Kurt Cobain

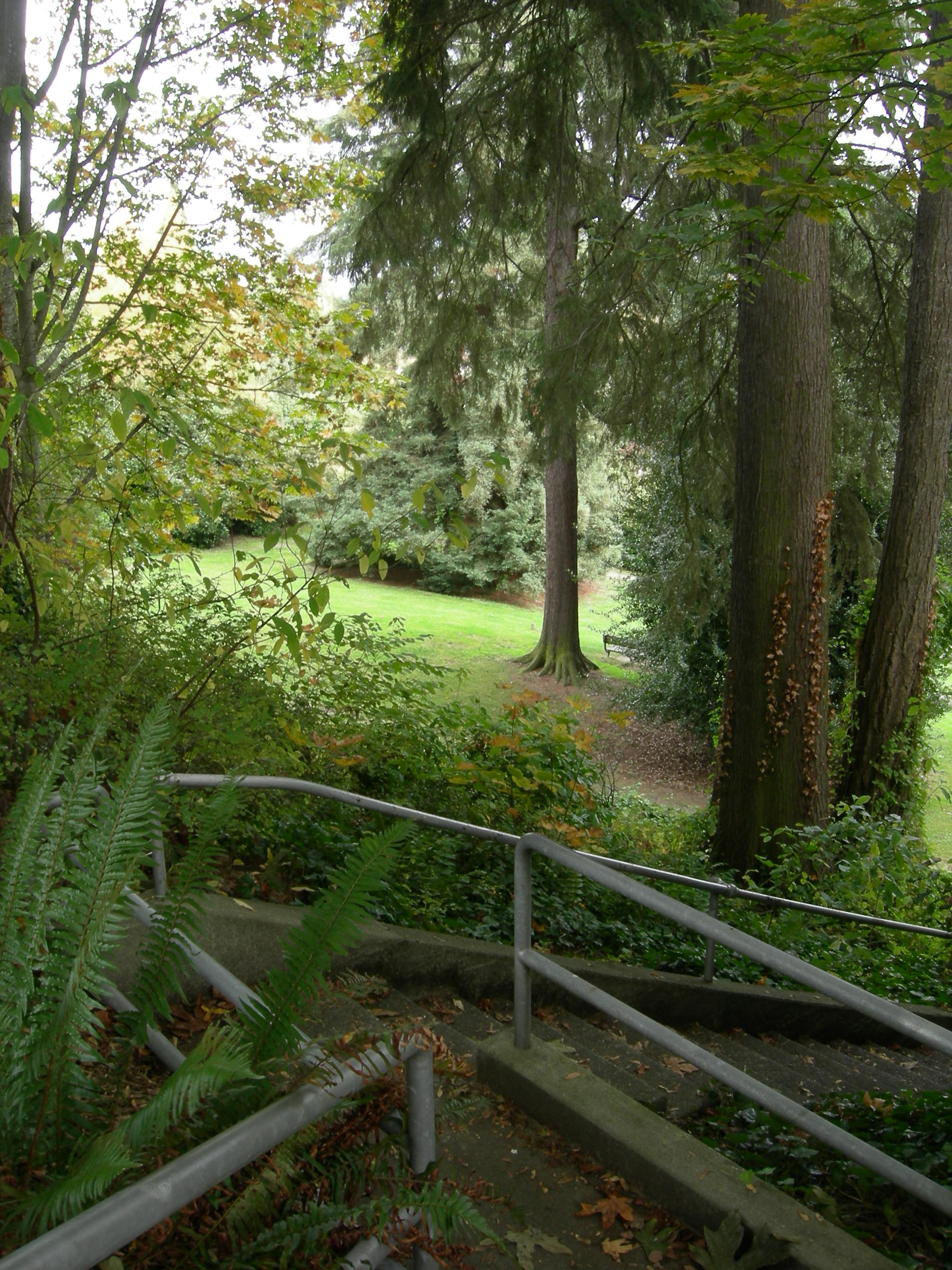
- Viretta Park in 2007
- Interactive map of Viretta Park
- Type: Urban Park
- Location: Seattle, Washington
- Coordinates: 47°37′08″N 122°16′55″W
- Area: 1.8 acres (7,300 m^{2})
- Operator: Seattle Parks and Recreation

Viretta Park is a 1.8-acre (7,300 m^{2}) park in the Denny-Blaine neighborhood of Seattle, Washington, located at the foot of E. John Street at 39th Avenue E. and stretching down to Lake Washington Boulevard. It was named by Charles L. Denny after his wife, Viretta Chambers Denny. It is located to the south of the former home of Kurt Cobain, where he was found dead. Nirvana fans gather at the park on the anniversary of Cobain's death (April 5), and to a lesser extent on his birthday (February 20), to pay tribute to him.

== Kurt Cobain Memorial ==
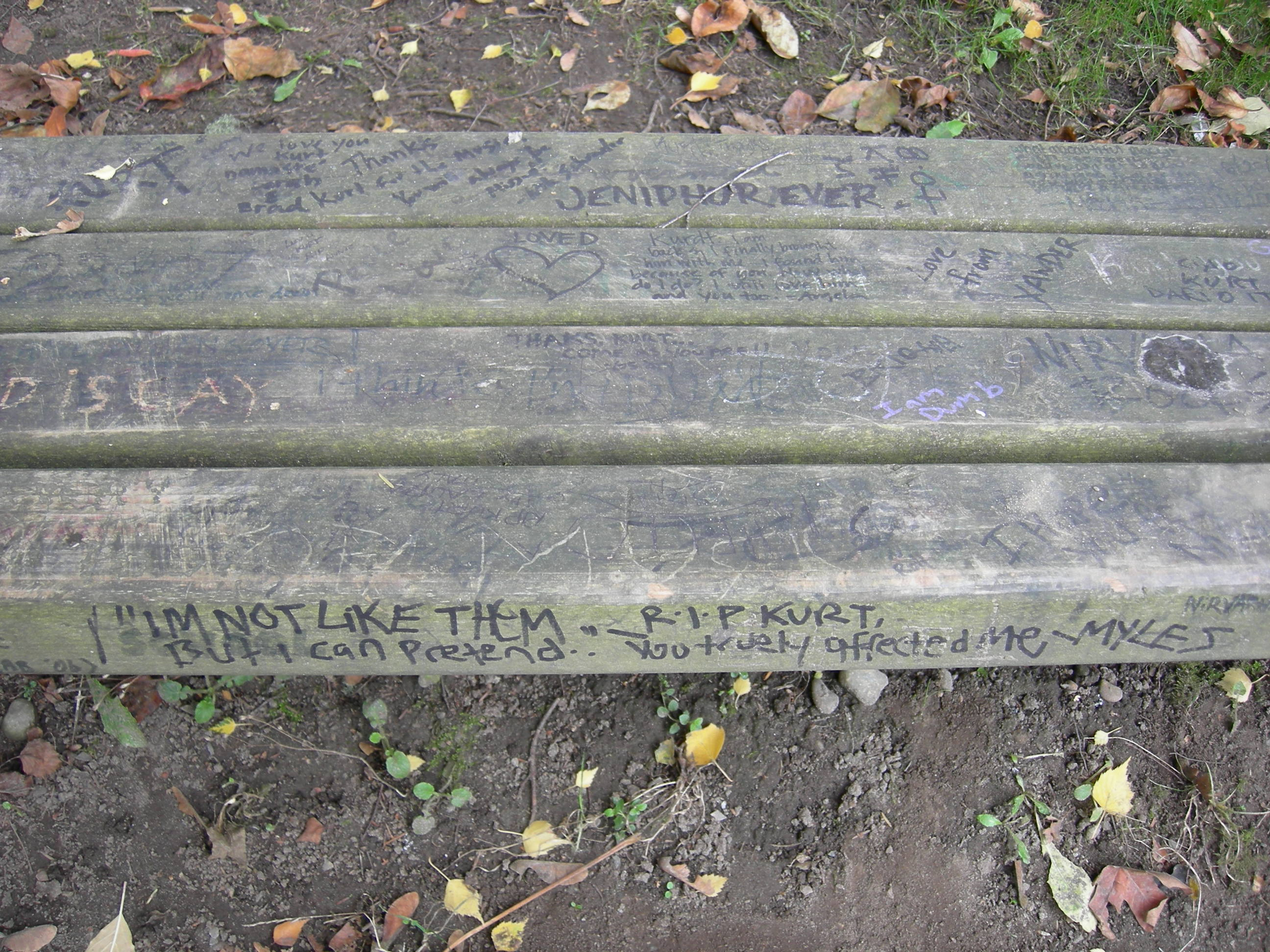
A Viretta Park bench serves as a de facto memorial to Kurt Cobain

The park's wooden benches, serving as the de facto memorial to Kurt Cobain in Seattle, are covered with graffiti messages to the rock icon. There has been much speculation over the years on whether the name of the park should be changed to "Kurt's Park", due to the late rock icon's large fan base.

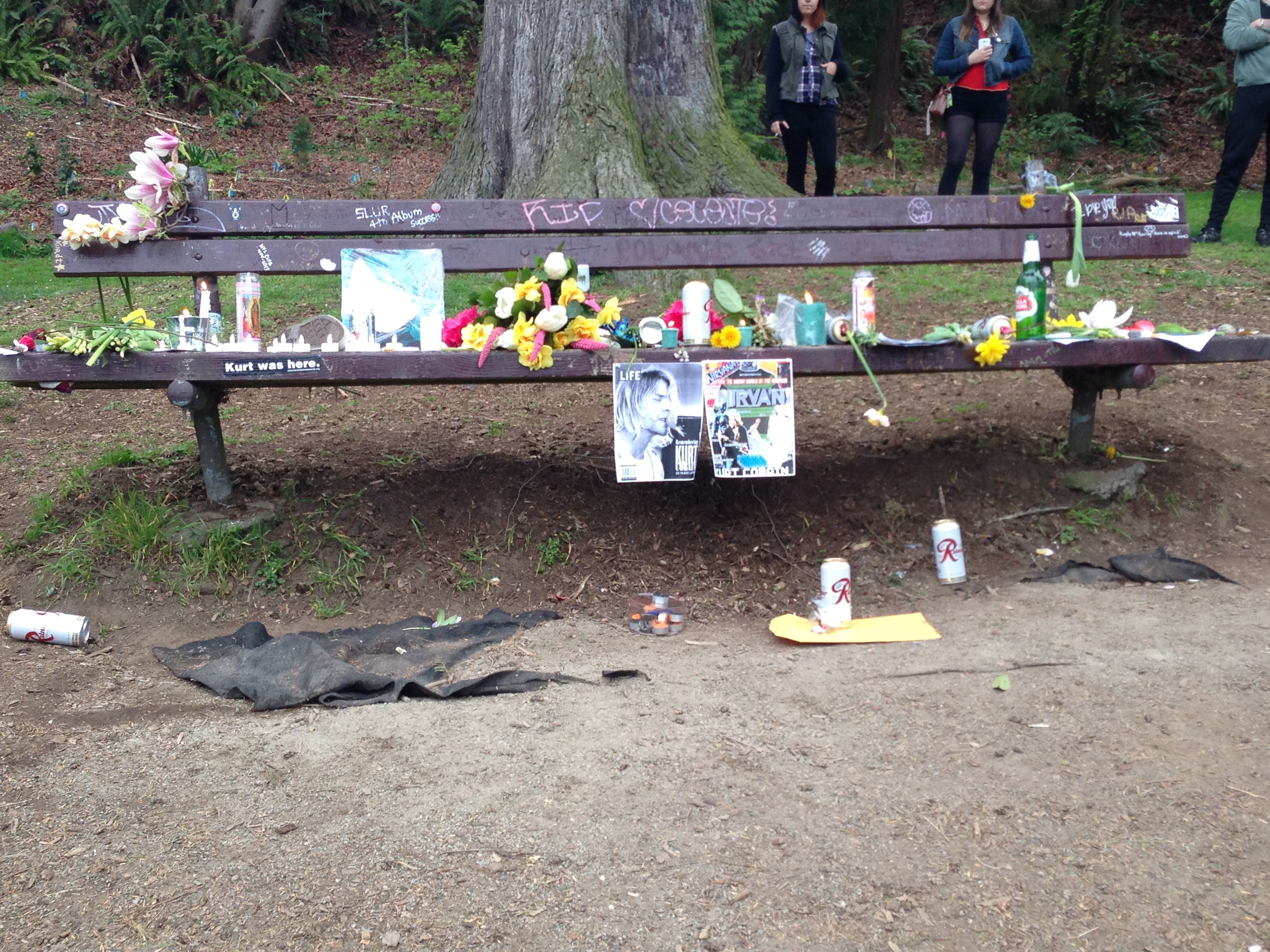
Fans pay tribute to Cobain on April 5, 2014, the 20th anniversary of the musician's death

== Howard Schultz controversy ==
The first version of the group Friends of Viretta Park was formed by area neighbors during a dispute with former neighbor and Starbucks CEO Howard Schultz, who formerly lived to the South. Schultz later moved to a new residence.

== Viretta Park Repair ==
In 2010 a group known as Viretta Park Repair was formed; according to its website its purpose was "to repair and restore Seattle's Viretta Park and... create a memorial for Nirvana's singer/songwriter Kurt Cobain who died next door to the park". Its first work party was scheduled to take place on Kurt Cobain's 44th birthday on February 20, 2011. Volunteers came from all over the Western United States and Southwestern Canada. The next series of scheduled work parties, scheduled for March 13, 2011 and April 5, 2011, were shut down by Seattle Parks and Recreation Superintendent Christopher Williams after a neighbor complained about memorial events - and a sculpture - that did not exist, but which were actually scheduled for Aberdeen, Washington.

Acting Parks Chief Christopher Williams sided with the neighbors in blocking any attempt to have any memorial to Kurt Cobain in the park, despite recent additions to Jimi Hendrix Park in Seattle and a memorial sculpture in Aberdeen, Washington which had the approval of Aberdeen's Mayor.

Since then Viretta Park Repair has been given the green light to hold additional work parties. A second work party was held on June 4, 2011 where volunteers removed invasive holly and blackberry bushes, laid burlap and covered the area with bark mulch.

== See also ==
- Kurt Cobain Memorial Park, in Aberdeen, Washington
