= Felony Flats, Aberdeen, Washington =

Felony Flats is the nickname of a poor neighborhood in Aberdeen, Washington. It is best known as the childhood home of Kurt Cobain, who lived at 1210 East First Street (46.98276°N 123.80655°W). Kurt Cobain Memorial Park sits at the south end of Young Street Bridge in the flats (46.98468°N 123.80515°W).

The placement of a "Q-Mart" tribal convenience store and smoke shop in Felony Flats, on Indian trust land owned by the Quinault Indian Nation, caused controversy upon its proposal in 2012 (46.97831°N 123.81211°W). The city's mayor said "Look here, 500 block of East Wishkah, the 600 block of East Wishkah... commonly known as Felony Flats... we don't need any more problems for Downtown Aberdeen."

Five women who robbed a bank in Olympia in 1998, inspired by the movie Set It Off, lived as part of a group of about a dozen women in a run-down house at 708 East First St. (46.98027°N 123.81279°W).

== See also ==
- Skid row, a term coined in Seattle, with equivalent districts in many cities
- The Flats, formerly an Irish ghetto in Cleveland
- Mud flats, occurring at the estuary of the Wishkah River
