= Barbara Thomas =

Barbara Thomas may refer to:

- Barbara Judge (1946–2020), previously known as Barbara Singer Thomas, American and British lawyer and businesswoman
- Barbara Earl Thomas (born 1948), American artist, writer, and arts administrator
