= Victoria Haven =

American artist (born 1964)

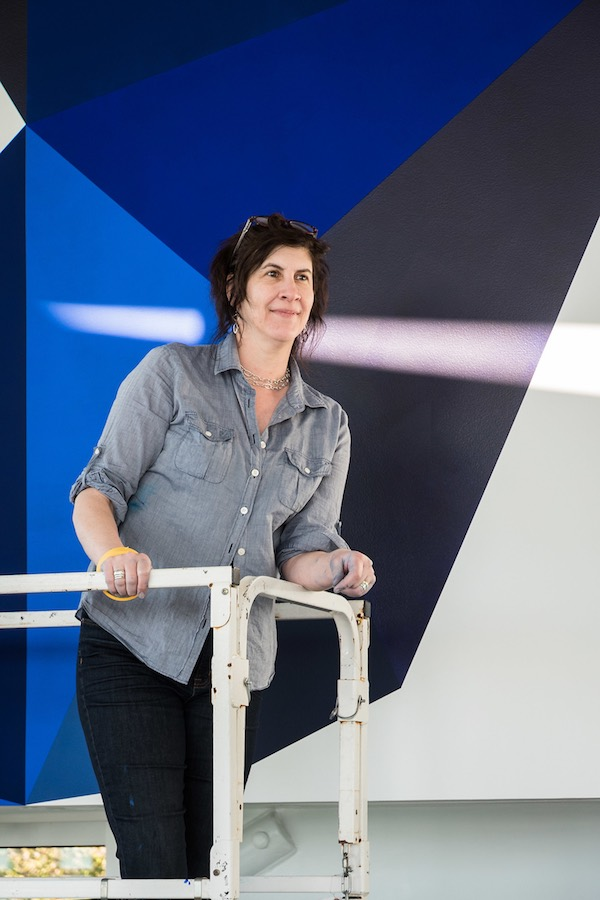
- Haven photographed by Robert Wade
- Born: Victoria Haven; 1964 (age 61–62); Seattle, Washington, United States
- Education: 1999 MA Goldsmiths College, University of London, 1989 BFA University of Washington

Victoria Haven (born 1964 in Seattle) is an American artist known for her investigative drawing practices which often operate in the spaces between two and three dimensions. Using materials as varied as tape, rubber-bands, Gore-Tex, forged steel, and excavated building components, her work traces the corridors of real and imagined space. Critics say her "geometric abstractions...draw connections between landscape, history, and lived experience" with her work Blue Sun echoing the "weight and volume [of] the Olympic Mountain range" of Washington State. The artist says that Blue Sun was inspired by time-lapse video of demolition and reconstruction in Seattle's South Lake Union neighborhood.

== Career ==
Haven's art has been shown at the Frye Art Museum, Howard House, and Greg Kucera Gallery in Seattle, Washington. Her works have also been featured in group exhibitions at the Metropolitan Museum of Art in New York and at Lisson Gallery in London.

== Recognition ==
Haven won two fellowships supported by the Pollock-Krasner Foundation (1996 and 2000) She has been awarded residencies at MacDowell Colony, NH and Rauschenberg Residency Captiva, FL. She has received grants from The Neddy Award at Cornish, the Betty Bowen Award from the Seattle Art Museum and The Stranger's Genius Award in 2004.

== Recent exhibitions ==
=== 2017 ===
- Angle, Pitch @ Outside, MA. Curated by Amie Cunat

=== 2016 ===
- Metropolitan Museum of Art: Drawings and Prints; Selections from the Met Collection
- Blue Sun, commissioned wall drawing for Olympic Sculpture Park, Seattle, WA
- Line, Lisson Gallery, London. Curated by Drawing Room, UK
- Contemporary Northwest Art Award Exhibition, Portland Art Museum
