= Drew Christie =

American animator and filmmaker

- Born: 1984 (age 41–42)

Drew Christie (born 1984) is an American animator and filmmaker. His animations have been featured in The Criterion Collection, The New York Times, Sundance TV and Vanity Fair. In 2007 he won The Seattle Times/Seattle International Film Festival's 3 Minute Masterpiece competition with ‘How to Bring Democracy to the Fish.’ In 2012 he was shortlisted for the Stranger Genius Awards for Song of the Spindle in the film category, which he won in 2014. In 2010 he received the Spotlight Award from Seattle Magazine. He contributed animation to the documentary film Nuts! and co-created the animated series Drawn & Recorded for Spotify with music producer T Bone Burnett. He resides on Whidbey Island, Washington.
