= Cherdonna Shinatra =

American dancer, drag queen and performance artist

- Born: Jody Keuhner; 1979 or 1980 (age 45–46)
- Education: University of South Florida (BA, BFA)
- Years active: 2007–present
- Website: cherdonna.com

Cherdonna Shinatra is the stage name of Jody Kuehner (born 1979), a Seattle-based, American dancer, drag queen and performance artist. Kuehner won the Stranger Genius Award in Performance in 2015.

== Career ==
=== Performance style ===
Kuehner has been called a "female impersonator impersonator" and describes her own performance as Cherdonna as "a female-bodied person, presenting as a male-bodied person, presenting as a female". She has been mistaken for a man by some audience members who don't expect to see the "exaggerat[ed] femininity" displayed by a drag persona to have a female body. After a performance in Seattle she had her breasts grabbed by a person who expected to find a prosthetic, and she performed onstage several times with a male partner before he realized she was not also male.

Keuhner incorporates many elements into her performances, including dance, theater, drag, burlesque, glitter, celebrity impersonations, audience interaction, and clowning.

=== Dance instruction ===
Kuehner was artist in residence and instructor at Velocity Dance Center in 2014.

== Personal life ==
Kuehner describes herself as queer.
