= Young Street Bridge (Aberdeen, Washington) =

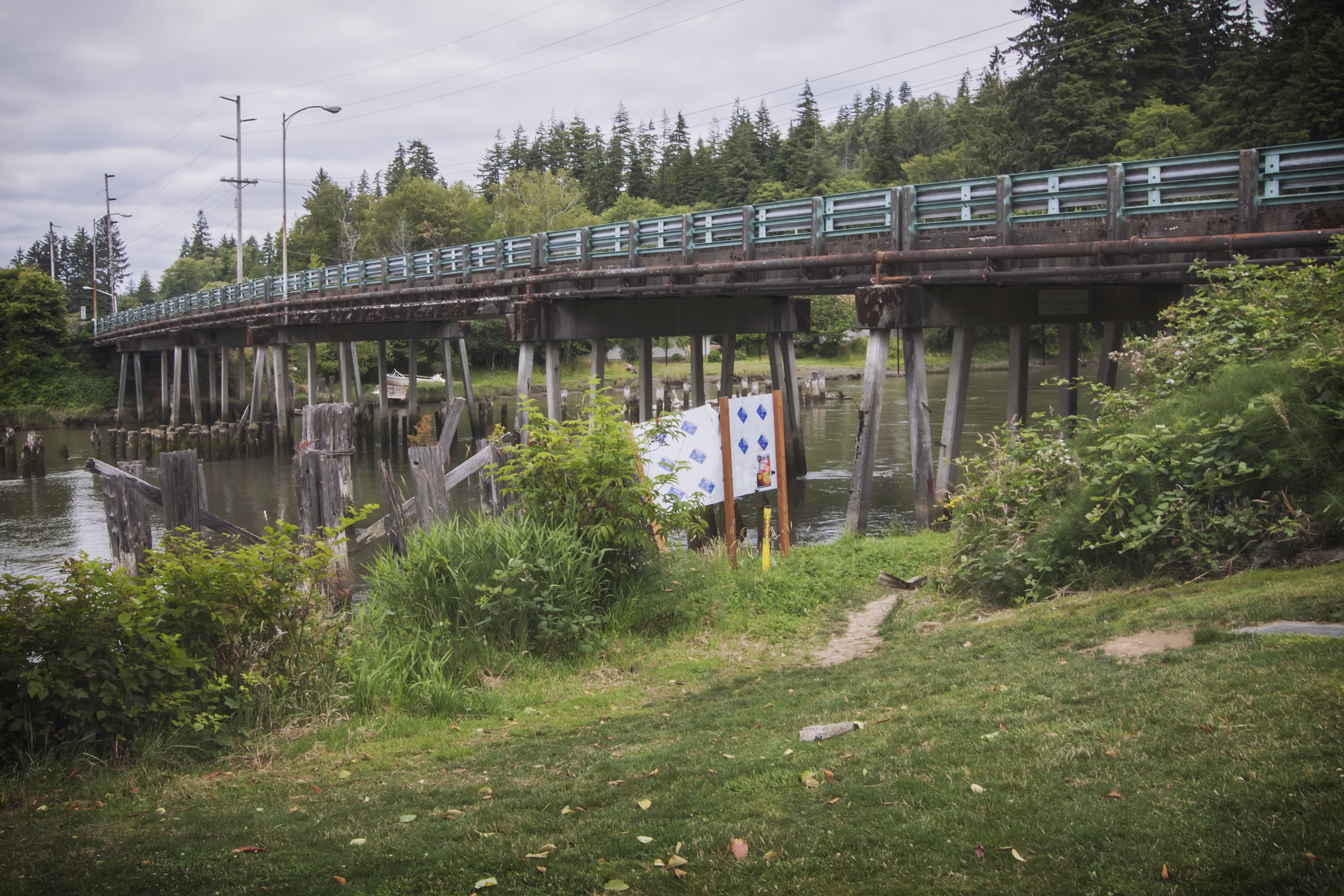
- Coordinates: 46°59′05″N 123°48′18″W
- Crosses: Wishkah River
- Locale: Aberdeen, Washington, U.S.

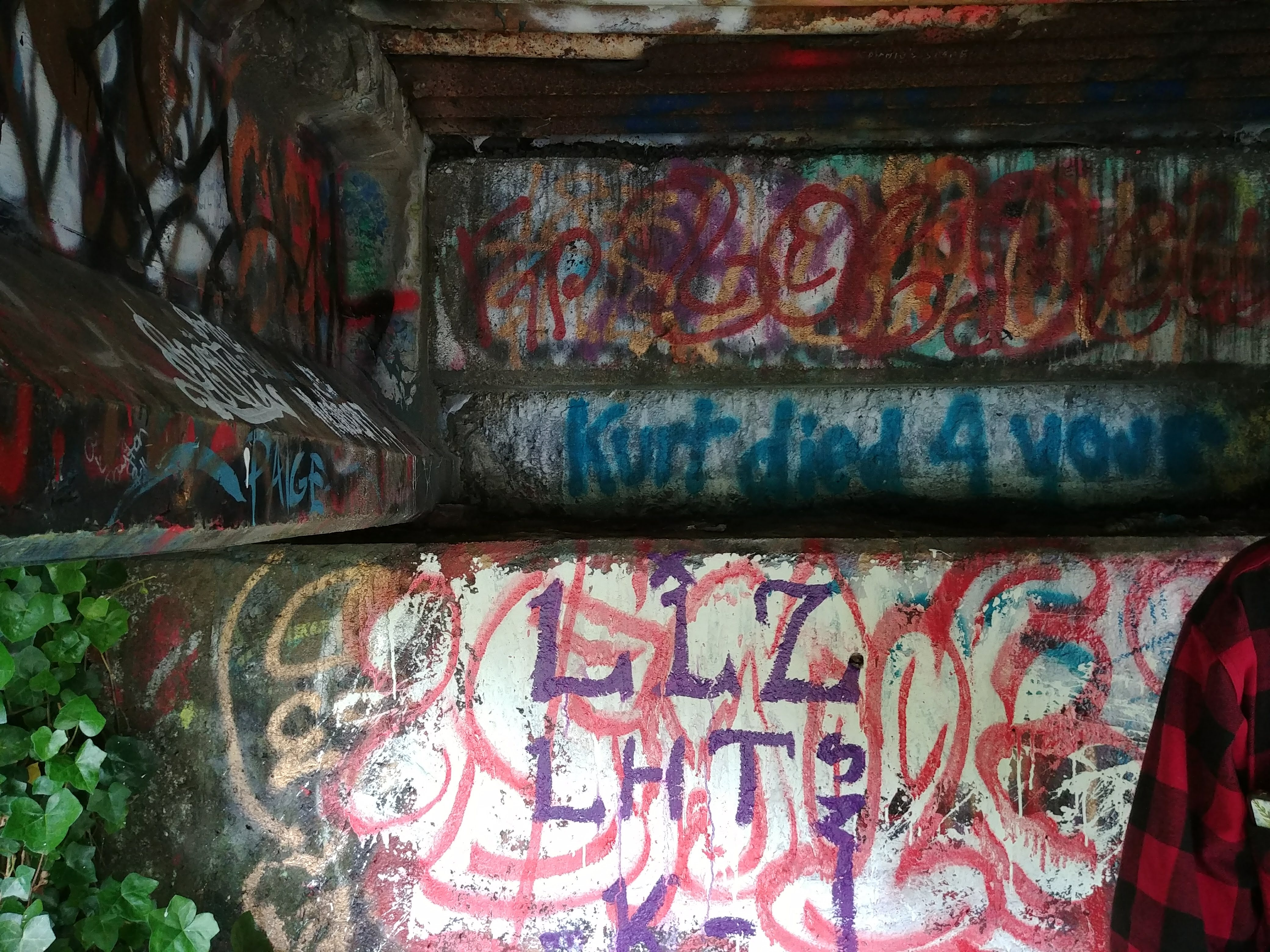
Graffiti under the bridge

Young Street Bridge is a bridge in North Aberdeen, Washington. It covers a brief span along the Wishkah River, carrying a north/south-bound thoroughfare which connects the City of Aberdeen with the North Aberdeen neighborhood and other outlying communities.

Most notably, the bridge has been mentioned in numerous accounts as a temporary home for Nirvana frontman Kurt Cobain. It is hinted at in the lyrics of the song "Something in the Way". The walls of the bridge are completely covered in graffiti inspired by Cobain and Nirvana.

In April 2011, the City of Aberdeen commissioned a 13 feet (4.0 m) tall electric guitar statue near the Young Street Bridge in honor of the musician's career. In 2015, the Kurt Cobain Memorial Park was created nearby.
