= Zoe Scofield =

Choreographer and dancer

Zoe Scofield is a choreographer and dancer best known for her work with Juniper Shuey with whom she is co-director of zoe|juniper, a Seattle-based dance and visual art company. Her work is characterized by multi-media, cross-genre works utilizing stage performance, video installation, photography and complex technical elements.

She received Guggenheim Fellowship in 2015.
