= Northwest African American Museum =

Museum in Seattle, Washington, U.S.

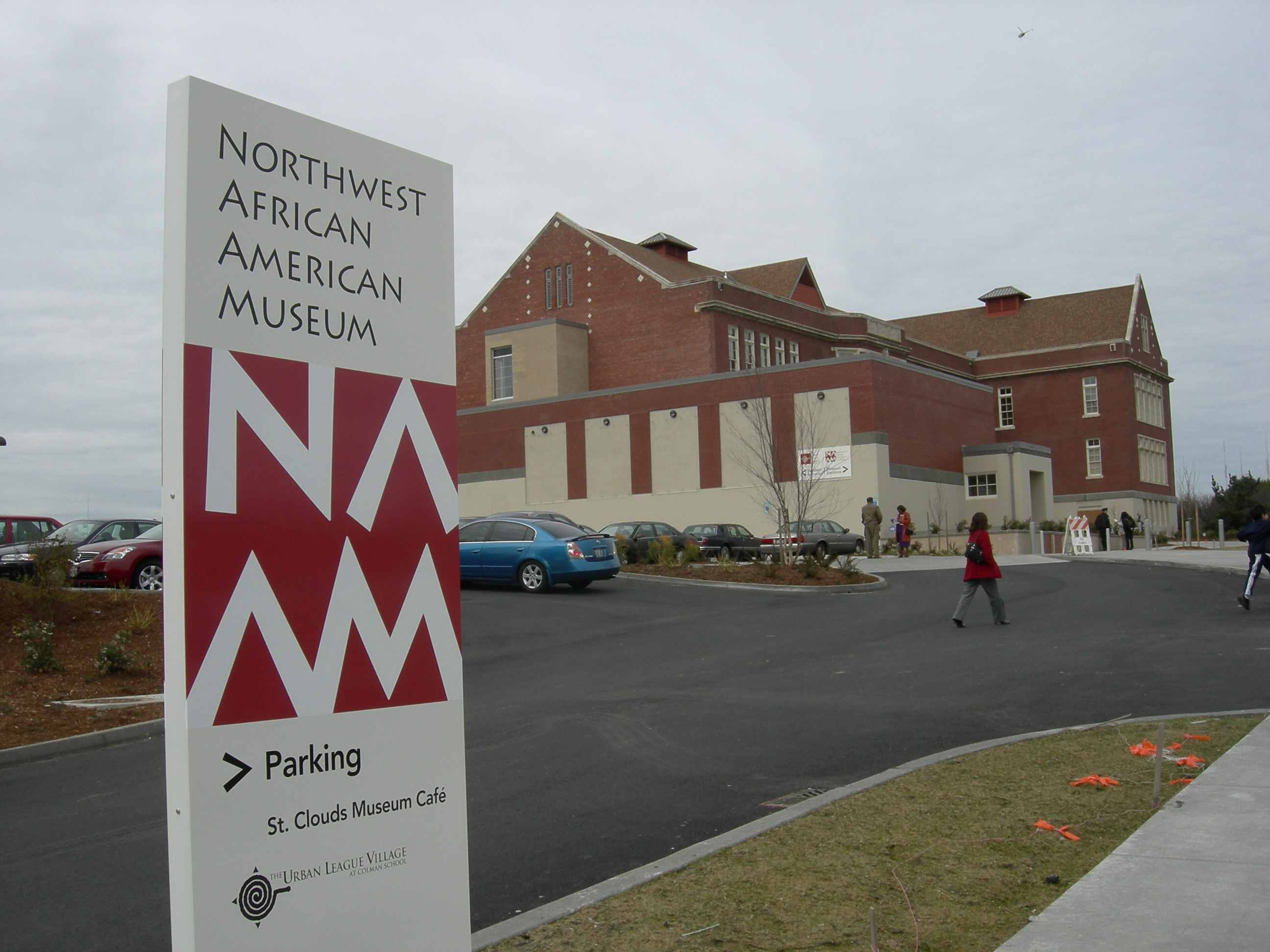
- Northwest African American Museum (NAAM) in 2008
- Former name: Colman School
- Established: 2008
- Location: 2300 S. Massachusetts Street; Seattle, Washington
- Coordinates: 47°35′20″N 122°18′06″W
- Type: African American, art, history, culture
- Architects: Donald King and Rico Quirindongo (museum conversion); James Stephen (school)
- Public transit access: Beacon Hill Station; King Street Station
- Website: www.naamnw.org

Seattle Landmark
- Designated: 2009
- Reference no.: 122950

The Northwest African American Museum (NAAM) is a museum in Seattle, Washington's historically African-American Central District neighborhood. The museum aims to present and preserve the connections between the Pacific Northwest and people of African descent and investigate and celebrate Black experiences in America through exhibitions, programs and events. The museum is located in the former Colman School (built 1909), with official status as a City of Seattle landmark. The building also contains 36 units of affordable housing.

The museum reopened after being closed for about three years due to the challenges the COVID19 pandemic. While the physical buildings were closed to the public, the museum remained active throughout that time. The museum reopened on Martin Luther King, Jr. Day - January 16, 2023. 2023 exhibits include: "Colors of Life- African American Abstract Art and the Regathering of Community", which features the work of four Black Pacific Northwest artists: Showcasing abstract art featuring the works of Northwest artists: Vincent Keele, Shantell Jackson, Lo Mar Metoyer, and Yeggy Michael. Other current exhibitions are "Freedom of Expression", which showcases visual artistic expression produced by artists of African descent residing in the Pacific Northwest, "challenging any misconception of what “Black” art is or is not" (NAAM Website), and "A Long Walk to Hope: Exploring Seattle’s Martin Luther King, Jr. Annual March Through Photos", which features the photography of Susan Fried.

== History ==
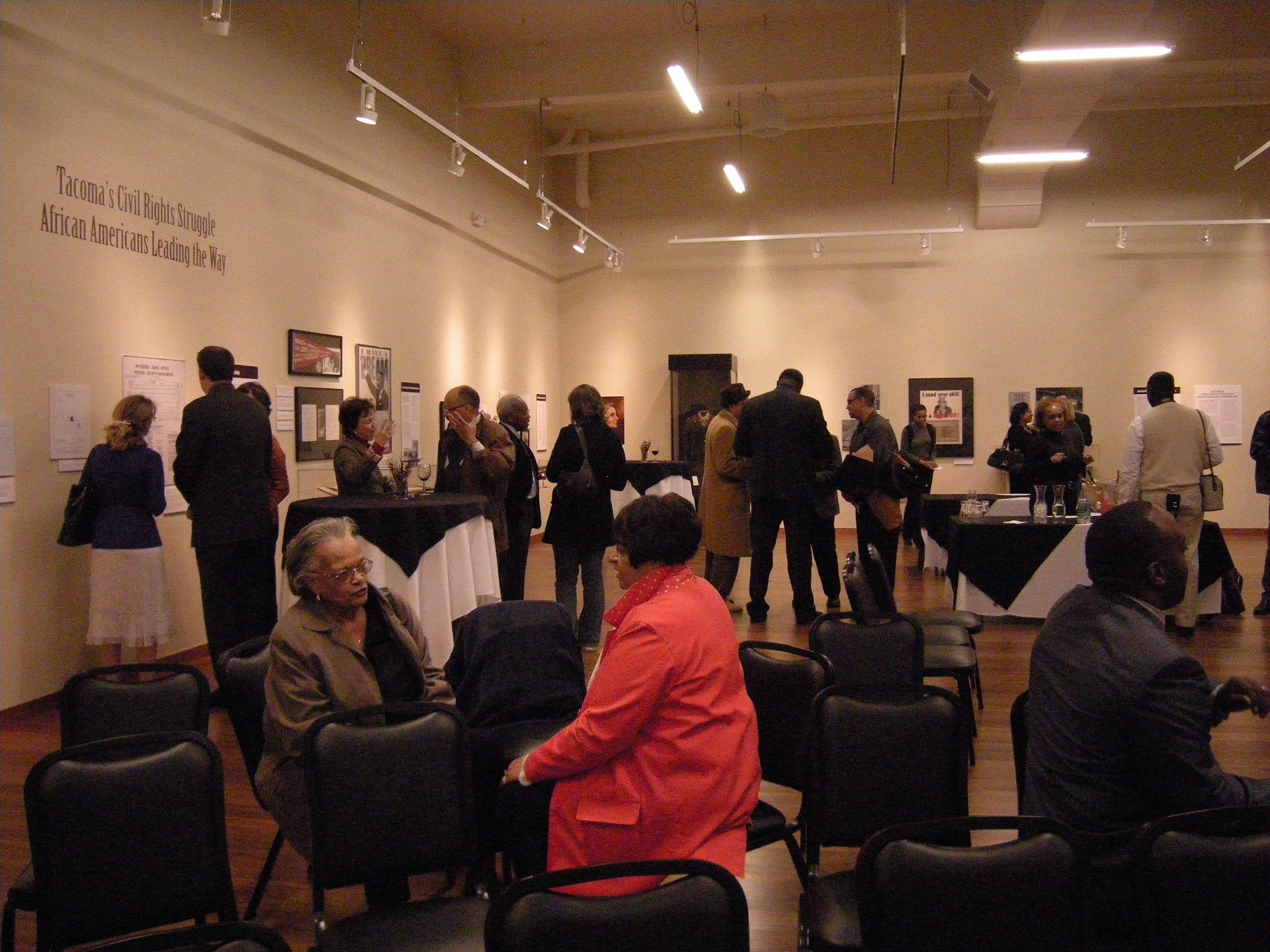
Opening of exhibit "Tacoma's Civil Rights Struggle: African Americans Leading the Way" (February 4, 2009).

The first efforts at creating the museum began in 1981, by a multi-racial coalition called Community Exchange. In 1984 a formal task force was established. The following year, community activists Earl Debnam, Michael Greenwood, Charlie James and Omari Tahir-Garrett occupied the disused Colman School to claim the building as the desired museum location. Tahir-Garrett's son Wyking Kwame Garrett later also participated in occupation, which continued for eight years. Meanwhile, the city of Seattle, Seattle School District, and community activists explored other possible locations for the museum.

In 1993, a not-for-profit organization called the African American Heritage Museum and Cultural Center was formed and a Board of Directors was selected to oversee the project with Mayor Norman Rice's office. In 1995, Mayor Rice appointed Bob Flowers as chairman of the museum board. The Urban League became involved in the project in 2001 under the leadership of Board of Directors and CEO James Kelly and purchased the Colman School from Seattle Public Schools in 2003. Unlike Flowers's group, the Urban League group had no continuity from the group that had originally occupied the building, leading to a split among African-American activists. Carver Gayton was appointed director of the museum and Barbara Earl Thomas was appointed curator in 2004-2005. In 2006 the Museum became its own 501(c)(3) non-profit separate from the Urban League of Metropolitan Seattle. Ground was broken in spring 2006. During the March 2008 opening ceremonies, Wyking Kwame Garrett seized the microphone and described the Urban-League-led museum as a "disgrace," a "scam," and "not what we sacrificed our lives for." He refused to leave or to be quiet, and was arrested. Nonetheless, Carver Gayton acknowledged the occupiers' role in bringing the museum into being: "They had a role in improving visibility of the African American Museum. They were part of that. We can't discount it." Similarly, Rev. Sam McKinney, former pastor of Seattle's Mount Zion Baptist Church, thanked the occupiers: "For eight years, they fought the wrecking ball."

NAAM is among the cultural organizations in the city of Seattle that have originated through an occupation protest, including El Centro de la Raza and the Daybreak Star Cultural Center.

=== Architecture ===
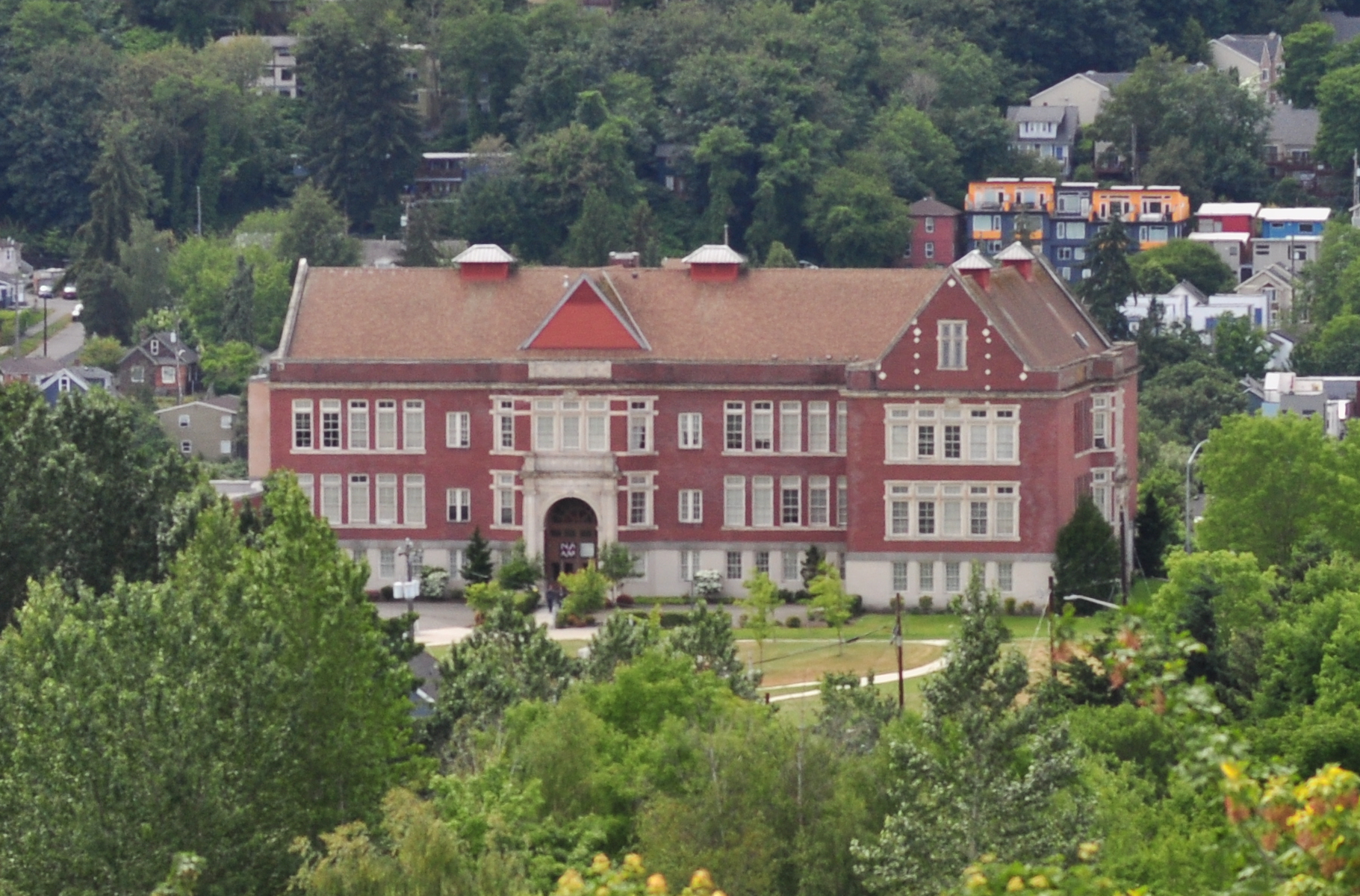
NAAM in 2018

The museum is located in the former Colman School designed by James Stephen and built in 1909 in the Jacobean architecture style.

Donald King Architects (DKA), a local black-owned architecture firm, was selected to design the museum conversion. Rico Quirindongo, of DKA, served as the lead architect on the project. The redesign transformed the building into a museum on the ground floor with the second and third stories reserved for 36 affordable apartments.

The building, a former elementary school, was nominated for landmark status by the Seattle Landmarks Preservation Board in 2005. It became an officially designated Seattle landmark in 2009.

== Facility ==
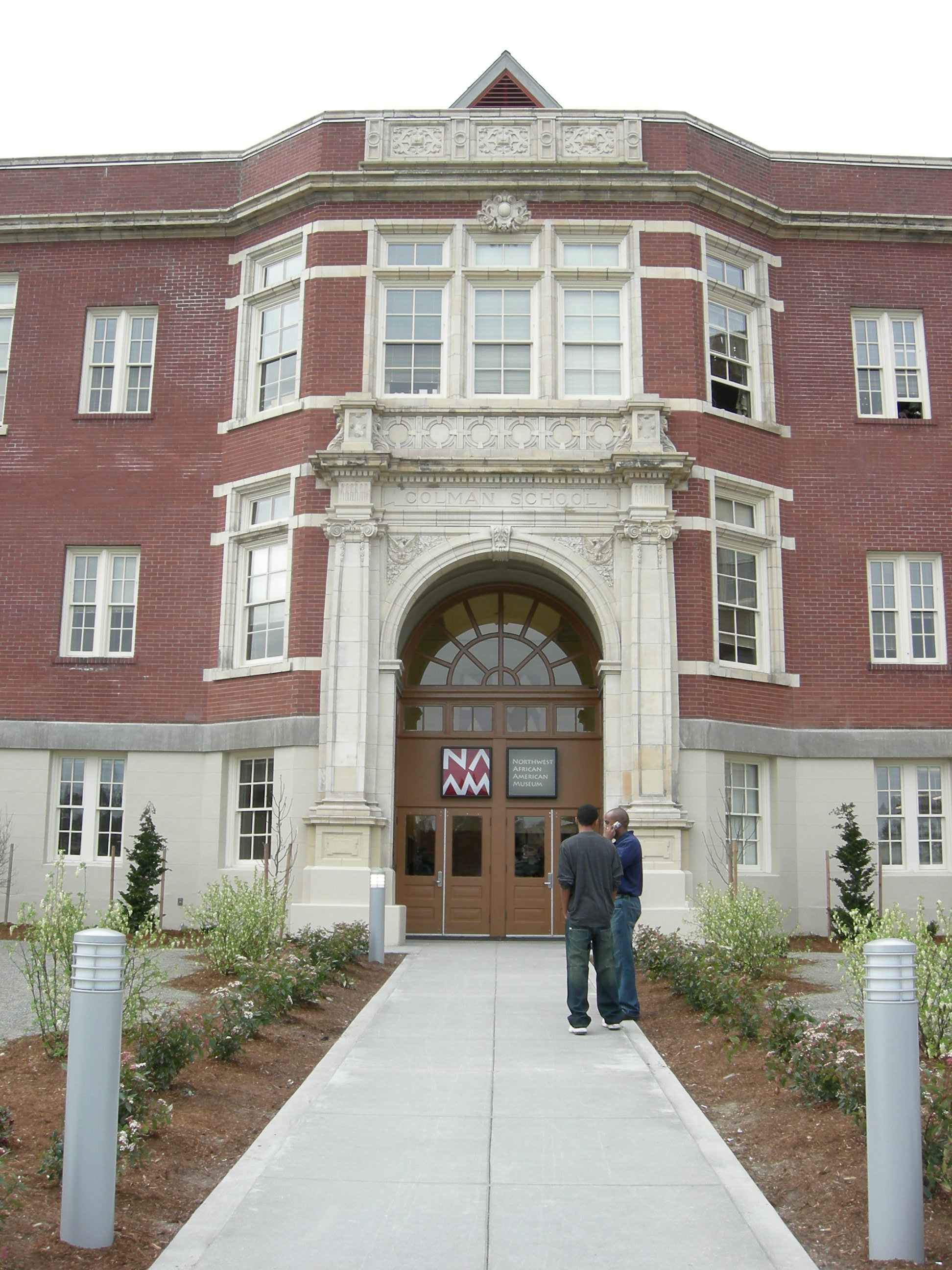
Museum entrance, photographed on NAAM's second day of operation, March 2008.

The museum has 17,000 square feet (1,600 m^{2}) of floor space, including a bookstore/gift shop, galleries for temporary and permanent exhibitions, and spaces available to the public as rentals. It is adjacent to Jimi Hendrix Park. The museum's inaugural exhibit featured the work of Jacob Lawrence and James W. Washington, Jr., two prominent, internationally acclaimed African American artists who made their homes in Seattle. Among the works in the show were Lawrence's series of five panels on the life of George Washington Bush, Washington State's first African American settler, and Washington's work from 1956 entitled "The Young Queen of Ethiopia," carved from Mexican volcanic stone. Though the artists came from different backgrounds and their art entreated different topics and mediums, "one thing they held in common was a firm belief in their own direction as artists. Their work moves us because they were clearly compelled to do it, to communicate deep social or inner truths. Both Lawrence and Washington did the painful work of finding their authentic voice as artists, a hard journey that few accomplish and which in itself sets them apart. That task was multiplied hugely by the fact that they were black men in a country with deep racial divides and prejudices. They were trailblazers, creating opportunities and helping others along the path. We can all benefit by the work they did."

== Programs ==
Interactive story times, movie nights, book talks, lectures, and research and writing workshops are among the programming and events hosted by the Museum. NAAM also hosts virtual exhibits and events, including the Dr. Carver Gayton Youth Curator Program sponsored by NBCUniversal and the Seattle Office of Arts and Culture.

In 2009, the Museum "used an AAHC grant to establish an annual nine-month curatorial internship, strengthening the museum’s relationship with the University of Washington museology program."

== See also ==
- List of museums focused on African Americans
