= Something in the Way =

1991 song by Nirvana

Song by Nirvana

from the album Nevermind
- Recorded: May 1991
- Studio: Sound City (Van Nuys); Devonshire (North Hollywood)
- Genre: Acoustic rock; alternative rock
- Length: 3:52 (20:35 with "Endless, Nameless")
- Label: DGC
- Songwriter: Kurt Cobain (Note: On the original release of Nevermind, the lyrics were credited to Cobain while the music was credited to the whole band. Later releases credit this song solely to Cobain.)
- Producers: Butch Vig; Nirvana

Nevermind track listing
- 13 tracks: 1. "Smells Like Teen Spirit"; 2. "In Bloom"; 3. "Come as You Are"; 4. "Breed"; 5. "Lithium"; 6. "Polly"; 7. "Territorial Pissings"; 8. "Drain You"; 9. "Lounge Act"; 10. "Stay Away"; 11. "On a Plain"; 12. "Something in the Way"; 13. "Endless, Nameless"

"Something in the Way" is a song by American rock band Nirvana, written by vocalist and guitarist Kurt Cobain. It is the 12th song on their second album, Nevermind, released in September 1991. It is the final listed song on the album, although most copies of Nevermind also feature the hidden track "Endless, Nameless", which occupies the same track as "Something in the Way" and begins after approximately 10 minutes of silence.

Never released as a single and never a consistent part of the band's live setlist, "Something in the Way" charted for the first time in August 2020, after appearing in the first trailer for the 2022 film The Batman. The song peaked at number two on Billboard's US Rock Digital Songs Sales chart, and number five on their US Alternative Digital Songs Sales charts. It also reached the top 20 in both Amazon Music's and iTunes' digital music charts.

On the week of March 26, 2022, the song entered the Billboard Hot 100 at number 46, becoming the band's fifth entry on the chart and first since "You Know You're Right" in 2002. It also made the Top 40 in Australia, Canada, Greece, Hungary, Iceland, Lithuania, New Zealand, Wales and on the Billboard Global 200.

== Early history ==
"Something in the Way" was written by Cobain in 1990. The earliest known version is a solo electric demo that appeared in a medley, along with the abandoned compositions "You Can't Change Me" and "Burn My Britches," first released on the Cobain compilation Montage of Heck: The Home Recordings in November 2015. American director Brett Morgen, who compiled the album as a soundtrack to his 2015 Cobain documentary Montage of Heck, discussed the medley in a 2015 NME interview, saying it was "almost like a rock opera, and to hear 'Something in the Way' emerge from the ashes of those other tracks was quite revealing. Kurt might've done an edit on that track, but I believe it was close to a continuous take."

The first live performance of "Something in the Way" was on November 25, 1990, at The Off Ramp Café in Seattle.

== Nevermind ==
"Something in the Way" was first recorded in the studio in May 1991 at Sound City Studios in Van Nuys, California by Butch Vig, for the band's second album, Nevermind. According to Vig, Cobain had originally wanted to record the song's instruments with the full band, but when initial attempts at this were unsuccessful, Cobain sat on a couch in the control room of studio A and played the song for Vig on acoustic guitar, to show him how he thought it should sound. Vig was impressed with the way Cobain's solo rendition sounded, and after turning off the air-conditioning and unplugging the telephone in the control room, set up microphones and recorded the song this way instead, starting with the guitar and the vocals.

This became the core of the recording, with the first vocal take being used for the verses. Cobain then recorded vocal harmonies, and drummer Dave Grohl and bassist Krist Novoselic added their parts, though both Grohl and Novoselic had difficulty playing in time with Cobain's performance. Novoselic also had trouble tuning his bass to Cobain's guitar, a 12-string Stella acoustic with five nylon guitar strings that Cobain had never tuned, and Grohl had to play more quietly than he was used to, to match the song's gentle mood. "Kurt and I wanted the drums to be very understated," Vig recalled. "Dave was used to playing much louder; plus, it can be very difficult to go back and lay drums over an acoustic guitar track, as the meter may vary a bit". Cobain's harmonies, the bass and the drums were recorded in studio B, a smaller room down the hall from the larger one they generally worked in. On the final day of the Nevermind sessions, Kirk Canning, a friend of the band's they had met through L7, added cello to the recording, although he too had difficulties tuning to Cobain's guitar.

== Post-Nevermind ==
On November 9, 1991, a version of the song was recorded by Miti Adhikari for the BBC program The Evening Session at Maida Vale Studios in London, England. This heavier electric version was more reminiscent of the way the song usually sounded when performed in concert. It was posthumously released on the 20th anniversary "Deluxe" and "Super Deluxe" versions of Nevermind in September 2011.

"Something in the Way" was performed as part of Nirvana's MTV Unplugged concert on November 18, 1993, at Sony Music Studios in New York City. This version featured Pat Smear on second guitar and Lori Goldston on cello. This song was performed live by Nirvana for the final time a week later, on November 26, 1993, at the Morocco Shrine Auditorium.

== Composition ==
=== Music ===
Describing the song as "sombre and disconsolate," American music journalist Gillian G. Garr wrote that "Something in the Way" "underscores the fact that Nirvana not only realized that emotions didn't always have to be expressed at the highest volume, they were also capable of pulling it off, with Cobain turning in one of his most expressive vocal performances."

=== Lyrics ===
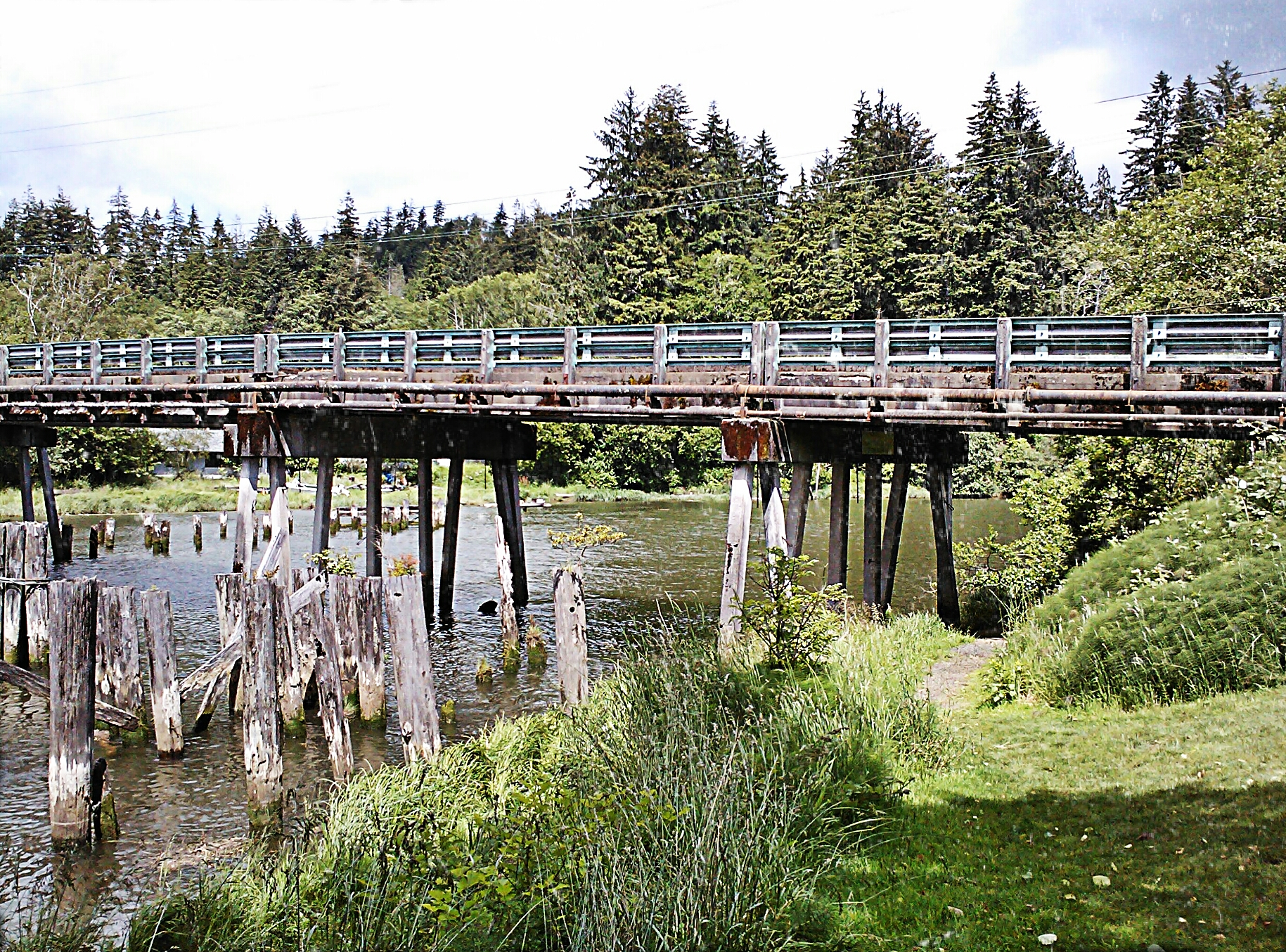
The Young Street Bridge, Aberdeen, Washington

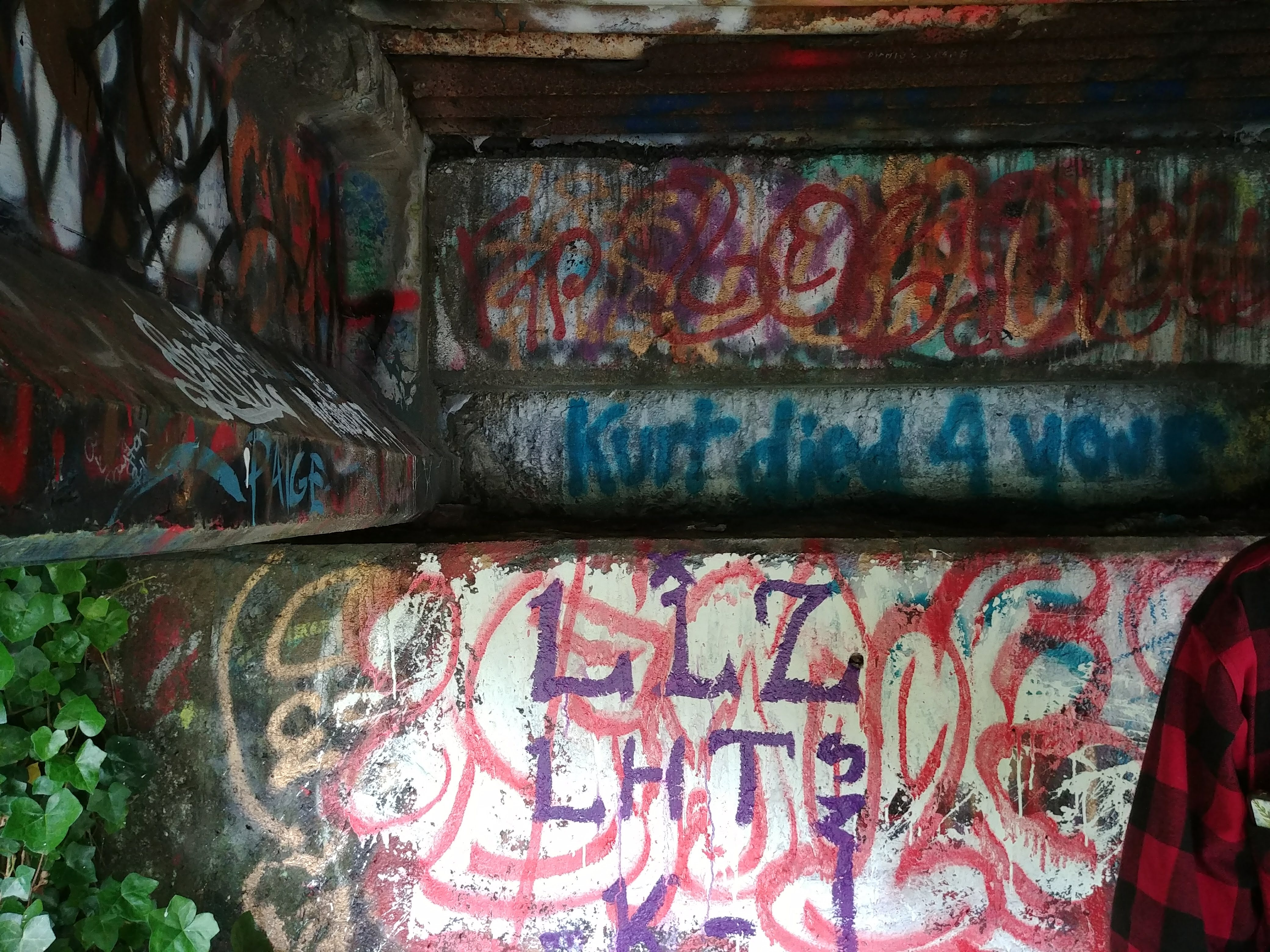
Graffiti in memory of Kurt Cobain under the Young Street Bridge

"Something in the Way" was originally believed to be based on a period when Cobain was homeless and slept underneath the Young Street Bridge, close to his childhood home in his native town of Aberdeen, Washington. While Cobain did run away from home as a teenager, the belief that he slept under the bridge was refuted by both Novoselic and Kurt's sister, Kim Cobain, in the 2001 Cobain biography, Heavier Than Heaven. Both confirmed that Cobain "hung out" under the bridge, which was a popular recreation area favored by local teenagers, but Novoselic told author Charles R. Cross that the river's "tides" and "muddy banks" would have made staying there for a prolonged period of time impossible. Cross argued that the much larger Sixth Street Bridge, located about half-a-mile away (and favoured by Aberdeen's homeless population) would have been more suitable to sleep under, but is unlikely to have been used by Cobain.

According to Cross, the reality of Cobain's situation during his approximately four-month period of homelessness was "more poignant" than the version presented in "Something in the Way." At first, Cobain slept "curled up like a kitten" in a cardboard refrigerator box on the porch of Dale Crover, drummer of local band, the Melvins. After this, he would sleep in the hallways of old apartment buildings with central heating, leaving before the residents of the building left their apartments. Occasionally, he and a friend would watch television and sleep in the waiting room of Grays Harbor Hospital, with Cobain getting food from the cafeteria by charging it to invented room numbers.

Cobain himself suggested that the song was not necessarily autobiographical, telling Nirvana biographer Michael Azerrad that the lyrics were "like if I was living under the bridge and I was dying of AIDS, if I was sick and I couldn't move and I was a total street person. That was kind of the fantasy of it".

In Azzerad's 1993 biography Come as You Are: The Story of Nirvana, Cobain stated that he used to fish from the Wishkah River close to this bridge, which may have inspired the lyric, "Its okay to eat fish, 'cos they don't have any feelings" in the song.

In a 2021 Los Angeles Times interview, Cobain's widow, Courtney Love, called "Something in the Way" "one of the great rock songs of all time," and described it as Cobain "clawing his way out...He's telling himself anything just to get through." Love cited the line, "It's OK to eat fish cause they don't have any feelings" as the one that affected her the most deeply, saying, "He knows it's a lie — here's a guy who loved turtles — but he thinks that if someone just loves him enough, then maybe, just maybe one day he will become real." In regards to the song's fictionalized aspects, Love said that "the place [Cobain] writes from is so emotionally desperate we all understand it."

=== Possible co-authorship ===
According to American musician Nick Oliveri, some of the song's lyrics were contributed by Mark Lanegan, vocalist of Seattle rock band Screaming Trees, who later joined the band in which Oliveri played bass, Queens of the Stone Age, as an additional vocalist. In the 2023 book Lanegan, Oliveri recalled the event:

"Mark said he wrote some lyrics on "Something in the Way" with Kurt on Nevermind. But Kurt had played on some of Mark’s solo stuff, The Winding Sheet. So, instead of getting paid, they just did this thing where, 'Hey man, I added a lyric on your song and you added a lyric on my song. Let’s just call it even.'"

Oliveri told author Greg Prato that he remembered Lanegan "kicking himself in the butt a little bit about that" later on, knowing that "he would have had a lot of money" if he had received a songwriting credit on the song.

== Release and reception ==
In 2015, Rolling Stone listed the song at number five on their ranking of 102 Nirvana songs. In 2019, The Guardian placed it at number 12 in their list of "Nirvana's 20 greatest songs". Stephen Thomas Erlewine ranked it 11th on the A.V. Club's "Essential Nirvana: Their 30 greatest songs, ranked" list in 2023.

In 2017, to mark what would have been Cobain's 50th birthday, the Phonographic Performance Limited released a list of the 20 most played Nirvana songs on the TV and radio in the UK, in which "Something in the Way" was ranked at number 17.

=== Posthumous chart success ===
In August 2020, the song reached number two on Billboard's US Rock Digital Songs Sales chart, number five on their US Alternative Digital Songs Sales chart, and number 45 on their all-genre Digital Song Sales chart, as well as number 18 on Amazon Music's Best Sellers in Songs chart, and number 19 on iTunes' top 200 songs chart, after appearing in the first trailer for the film, The Batman.

Streams of the song spiked by 1200% on Spotify shortly after the release of the film on March 4, 2022, helping it reach the top five of Spotify's Daily USA Top 50 songs ranking on March 8. An article published by Variety on March 11 reported that the song was currently third on Spotify's daily list. According to a March 15 Billboard article, the song earned 7.9 million on-demand official U.S. streams during the March 4 to March 10 tracking period, marking a 1,508% increase, and 3,100 downloads, a gain of 1,888%. Interest in the song also helped boost sales of Nevermind, which climbed to number one on the Top Rock Albums and Top Alternative Albums charts.

On the week of March 26, 2022, "Something in the Way" became the fifth Nirvana song to chart on the Billboard Hot 100, appearing at number 46 its one-week stay on the chart.

== Personnel ==
Personnel adapted from Nevermind liner notes

Nirvana

- Kurt Cobain – acoustic guitar, vocals
- Dave Grohl – drums
- Krist Novoselic – bass

Additional Performer

- Kirk Canning – cello

== MTV Unplugged in New York ==
The MTV Unplugged version of "Something in the Way" was one of two songs not included in the original broadcast of the show. However, it appeared on the live album MTV Unplugged in New York, released in November 1994. It also appeared as the b-side to the album's only commercial single, for the song "About a Girl". In 2002, it was included on vinyl and Japanese CD copies of the band's best-of compilation, Nirvana.

The full MTV Unplugged performance, including "Something in the Way," was released on DVD in November 2007.

In a 2023 Instagram comment, Cobain's and Love's daughter, Frances Bean Cobain, named "Something in the Way" as her favorite performance from the band's MTV Unplugged set, writing, "I like to imagine that if we had been able to grow up together, he would’ve been gentle with me in the same way he was gentle singing that song."

== In popular culture ==
A brief cover of the song, performed by Jerry O'Connell in the role of Frank "Cush" Cushman, appeared in the 1996 romantic comedy Jerry Maguire, directed by Cameron Crowe. The intentionally poor rendition appeared during a hotel room scene in which "Cush disrupts football business talk with a nasally, out-of-tune take on Nirvana’s darkest track off Nevermind," according to Ashley Zlatopolsky of Billboard.

The Nevermind version appeared in the 2005 war drama Jarhead, directed by Sam Mendes. According to Universal Pictures president of film music Kathy Nelson, Mendes had insisted on the song, but a then-ongoing dispute between Cobain's widow, Courtney Love, and surviving Nirvana members had made the licensing of Nirvana songs difficult at the time. However, Love allowed the song's use due to being a "huge fan" of Mendes and actor Peter Sarsgaard. "That's why it's probably the first Nirvana song you've heard in a movie," Nelson said.

On April 24, 2020, American musician Post Malone performed the song during his 15-song Nirvana tribute concert, which was livestreamed on YouTube and raised more than $4 million for the COVID-19 Solidarity Response Fund.

=== The Batman ===
American filmmaker Matt Reeves, writer and director of the 2022 film The Batman, revealed in a December 2021 interview with Gizmodo that listening to the song while writing the film's first act played a key role in helping him develop the character of Bruce Wayne. "Rather than make Bruce the playboy version we’ve seen before," Reeves explained, "there’s another version who had gone through a great tragedy and become a recluse. So I started making this connection to Gus Van Sant's Last Days, and the idea of this fictionalized version of Kurt Cobain being in this kind of decaying manor."

In a March 2022 NME interview, American actor Paul Dano revealed that the song also influenced his portrayal of the film's villain, the Riddler. "Well, in the script Matt had actually mentioned ‘Something In The Way’ by Nirvana," Dano told interviewer Olly Richards. "So that right there, that song, those words, that refrain, became hugely important to me. Nirvana became a part of that [character]."

The version featured in the film's August 2020 trailer is a remix of the Nevermind version by Alloy Tracks and Cavalry Music that incorporated themes by the film's composer Michael Giacchino and additional orchestral elements.

The song itself appears twice in the film, serving as a bookend for the first and third acts.

Following the theatrical release of the film in March 2022, audio streaming service Spotify reported a 1,200% increase in streams of the song on the platform, while Billboard reported a 1,508% increase in official U.S. streams and 1,888% increase in downloads. The song once again appeared on several Billboard charts, reaching number two on the Rock Streaming Songs and Rock Digital Song Sales chart, number four on the Alternative Digital Song Sales and Alternative Streaming Songs chart, number 20 on the Digital Song Sales chart, and number 27 on the Billboard Streaming Songs chart. It also entered the Hot 100 for the first time, peaking at number 46, becoming Nirvana's fifth song on the chart. American DJ Illenium remixed the song in collaboration with DC following the success of the film.

== Covers ==
Swedish heavy metal band Avatar included a cover version of the song on their 2014 album, Hail the Apocalypse.

Tunisian singer Emel Mathlouthi released a cover in English and Arabic in 2020 on her album The Tunis Diaries.

Transgender activist Daniella Carter and J Patt from The Knocks recorded an electronic cover version of the song in 2021. It is the debut single from Nirvana Reimagined as House and Techno by music producer Jonathan Hay.

Singer/songwriter Stephen Wilson Jr. released an EP in 2025 called "Blankets" which included a cover version of the song.

== Charts ==
2020 weekly chart performance for "Something in the Way"
Chart (2020)	Peak position
Scottish Singles Sales (Official Charts)	42
UK Singles Downloads (Official Charts)	50
UK Singles Sales (OCC)	51
US Digital Song Sales (Billboard)	45
US Rock Digital Songs Sales (Billboard)	2
US Alternative Digital Songs Sales (Billboard)	5
Wales (OCC)	39

2022 weekly chart performance for "Something in the Way"
Chart (2022)	Peak position
Australia (ARIA)	22
Canada Hot 100 (Billboard)	34
Global 200 (Billboard)	23
Czech Republic Singles Digital (ČNS IFPI)	57
France (SNEP)	180
Greece (IFPI)	8
Hungary (Single Top 40)	25
Iceland (Tónlistinn)	15
Ireland (IRMA)	47
Lithuania (AGATA)	34
New Zealand (Recorded Music NZ)	40
Portugal (AFP)	169
Slovakia (Singles Digitál Top 100)	48
Sweden Heatseeker (Sverigetopplistan)	8
UK Singles (Official Charts)	76
US Billboard Hot 100	46
US Hot Rock & Alternative Songs (Billboard)	4

== Certifications ==
Certifications for "Something in the Way"
Region	Certification	Certified units/sales
Australia (ARIA)	2× Platinum	140,000^{‡}
Canada (Music Canada)	Platinum	80,000^{‡}
New Zealand (RMNZ)	Platinum	30,000^{‡}
United Kingdom (BPI) Sales since 2004	Gold	400,000^{‡}
United States (RIAA)	Platinum	1,000,000^{‡}
^{‡} Sales+streaming figures based on certification alone.

== Accolades ==
Accolades for "Something in the Way"
Year	Publication	Country	Accolade	Rank
1998	Kerrang!	United Kingdom	20 Great Nirvana Songs Picked by the Stars	13
2019	The Guardian	United Kingdom	Nirvana's 20 greatest songs – ranked!	12
2023	The A.V. Club	United States	Essential Nirvana: Their 30 greatest songs, ranked	11

== Other releases ==
- A boombox-recorded full-band version, recorded in March 1991 at a barn in Tacoma, Washington the band were using as a rehearsal space, appeared on disc two of the 20th anniversary "Deluxe" and "Super Deluxe" versions of Nevermind, released in September 2011.
- An early "Devonshire mix" of the Nevermind version appeared on disc four of the 20th anniversary "Super Deluxe" version of Nevermind.
- Amateur footage of live version, recorded at Kokusai Koryu Center in Osaka, Japan on February 14, 1992, appeared on the live video Live! Tonight! Sold Out!!, released in November 1994.
