= Jimi Hendrix Park =

Park in Seattle, Washington, U.S.

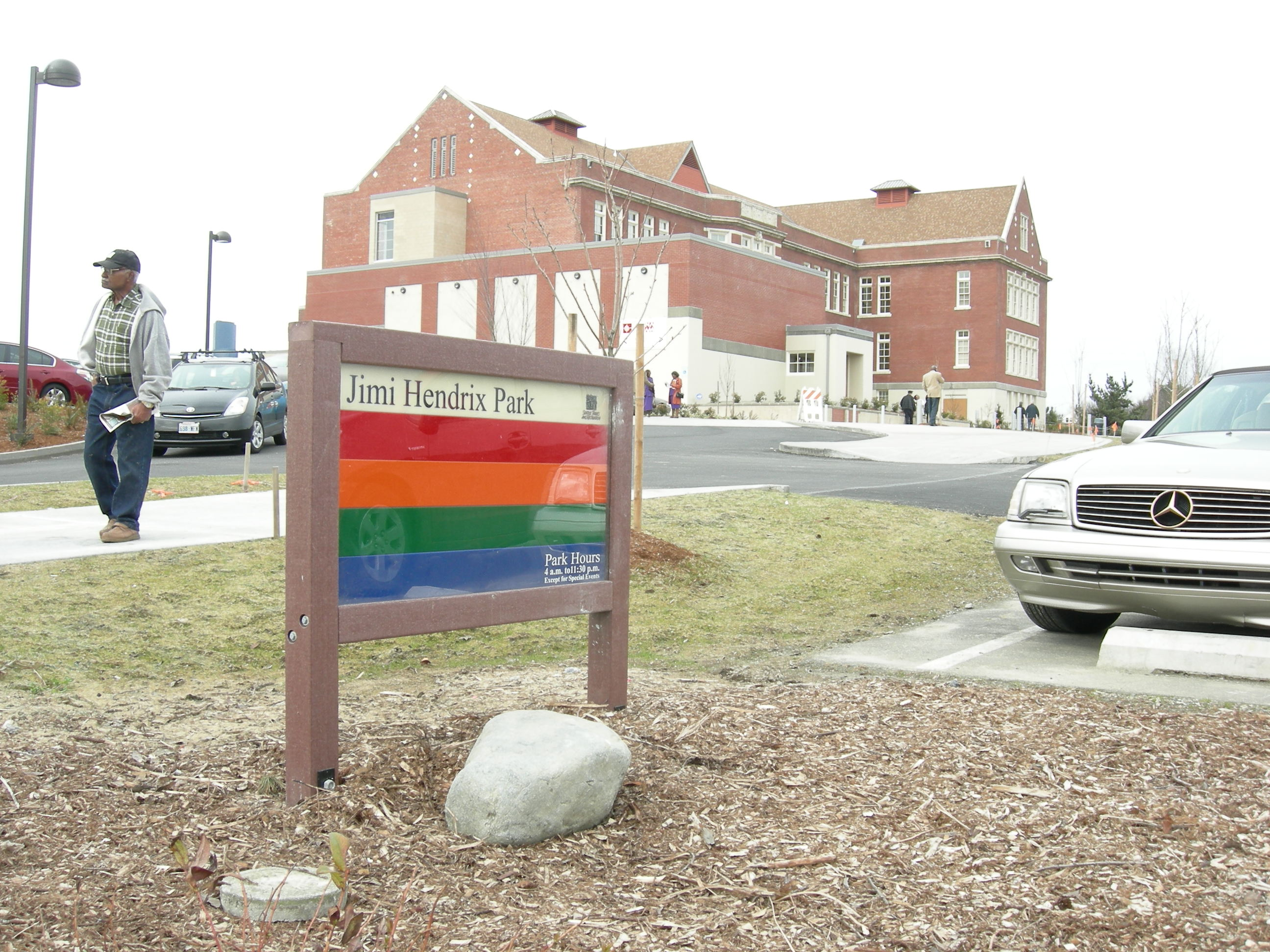
- Sign at park entrance with NWAAM in the background
- Type: Urban park
- Location: 2400 S Massachusetts Street Seattle, Washington 98144
- Coordinates: 47.5891355°N 122.3034117°W
- Website: www.seattle.gov/parks/find/parks/jimi-hendrix-park

Jimi Hendrix Park is a 2.3-acre (0.93 ha) park in Seattle, Washington named in honor of musician Jimi Hendrix, who was from Seattle.

The park was named in 2006, and the opening of the park was announced in December, 2011 at the Northwest African American Museum, adjacent to the park, with an opening planned for 2012 to mark the 70th anniversary of the musician's birth. As of summer 2013, the park design had been approved by the city, and development from a large grassy area into the planned guitar-shaped system of pathways and vegetation had not yet begun. The park opened on June 17, 2017. The park's opening was introduced by the Bellevue School of Rock playing the classic Jimi Hendrix tune "Purple Haze." The park was funded by various city funds and donations from the Nisqually Tribe and Janie Hendrix, stepsister of Jimi Hendrix. The Jimi Hendrix park is the fourth public memorial to Hendrix in Seattle, the others being a plaque in Woodland Park Zoo, a bust in his high school's library, and a privately funded sidewalk statue.
