= Wishkah River =

River in Washington, US

Coordinates: 46°59′14.5″N 123°48′40″W

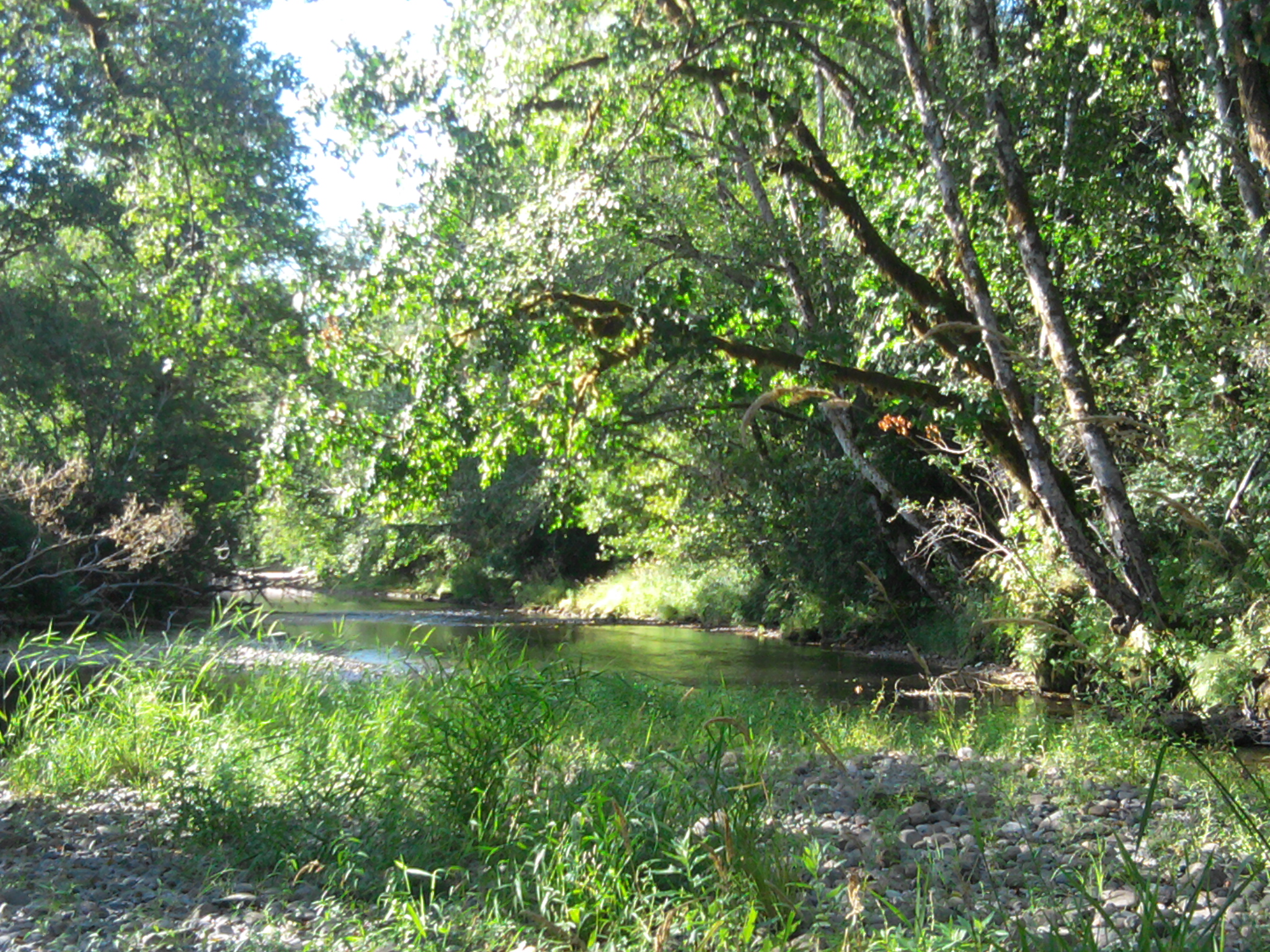
The Wishkah River near Hoquiam

The Wishkah River is a tributary of the Chehalis River in the U.S. state of Washington. Approximately 40 miles (64 km) long, the river drains a remote rural area of approximately 102 square miles (260 km^{2}) in Grays Harbor County along the Washington coast north of Aberdeen. It flows south through the county and empties into the Chehalis at Aberdeen.

The name "Wishkah" is an adaptation of the Chehalis word hwish-kahl, meaning "stinking water".

== Association with Nirvana ==
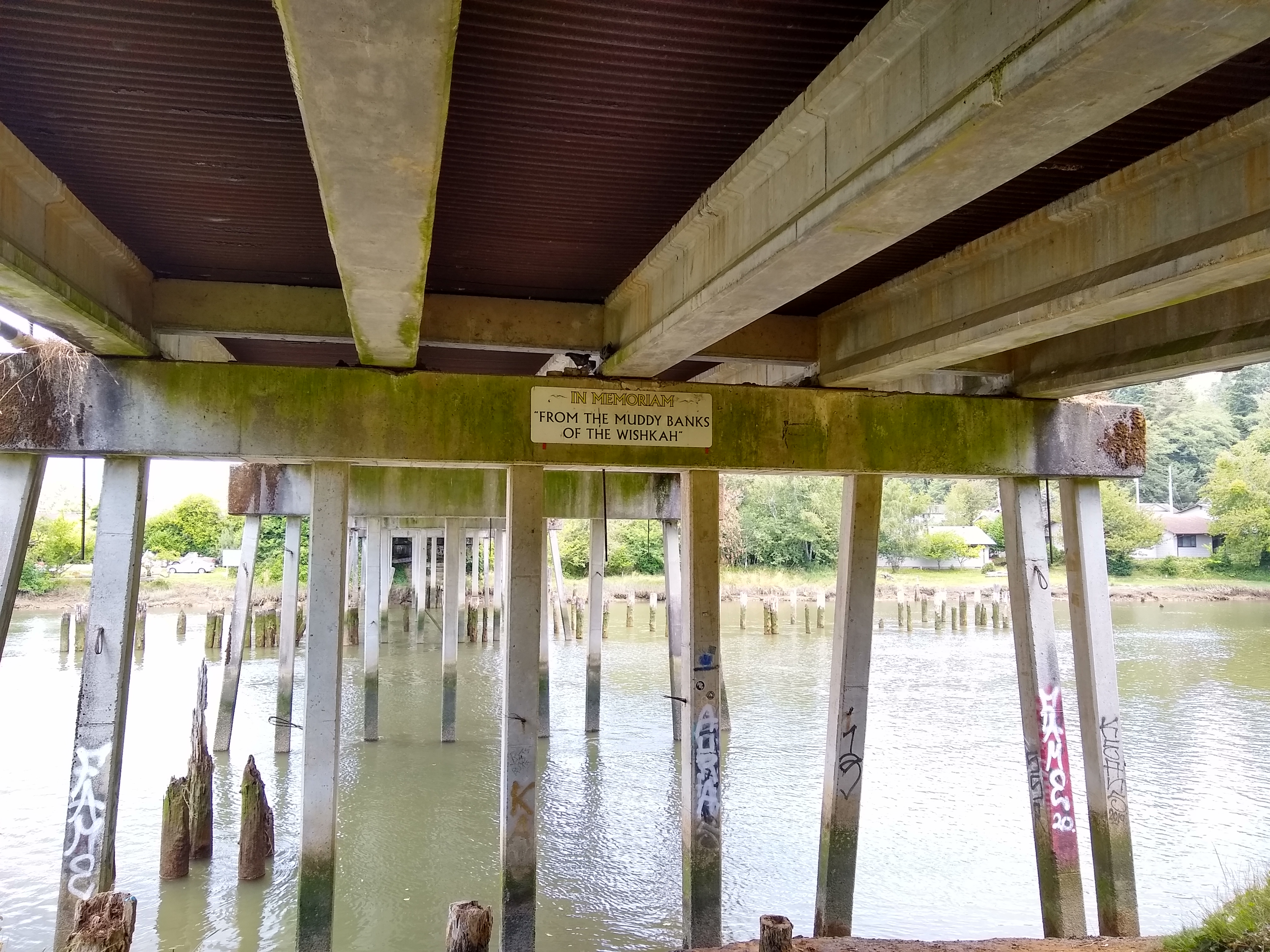
Nirvana memorial sign under the Young Street Bridge in Aberdeen

While living under a bridge on the river after dropping out of high school and being kicked out of the family home, Nirvana frontman Kurt Cobain wrote the song "Something in the Way" about the experience. According to biographer Charles R. Cross, however, this was largely a myth created by Cobain. One third of Cobain's ashes were scattered in the river after his death. From the Muddy Banks of the Wishkah is a live album released by Nirvana on October 1, 1996, two and a half years after Cobain's death.

== See also ==
- List of rivers of Washington (state)
