= Barbara Earl Thomas =

American painter

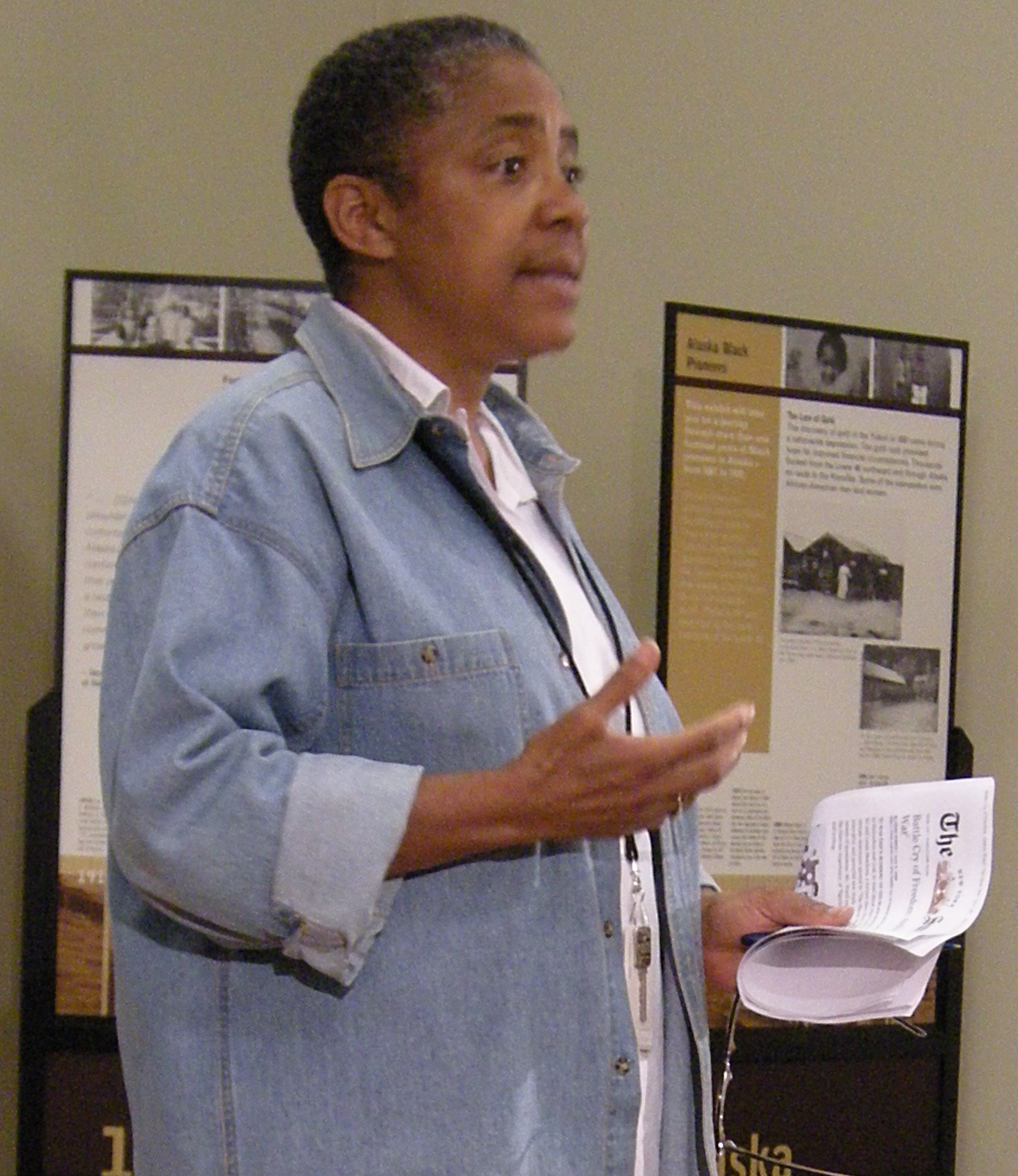
- Barbara Earl Thomas
- Born: 1948 (age 77–78); Seattle, United States
- Website: Barbara Earl Thomas

Barbara Earl Thomas (born 1948) is an American visual artist, writer, and arts administrator based in Seattle.

== Early life ==
Thomas, a granddaughter of southern sharecroppers who migrated to the Pacific Northwest in the 1940s. Born in Seattle, WA in 1948, she is among the first generation in her family born outside of Texas and Louisiana. The artist recalls being surrounded by family members who constantly made things during her childhood. From the age of eight, she was constantly drawing and painting. She also copied images from newspapers and books, giving the results to her mother.

== Education ==
Thomas received her B.A. from the University of Washington in 1973. After studying at University of Grenoble in France in 1976, she returned to her undergraduate alma mater, completing her Master of Fine Arts degree in 1977. Thomas studied under Jacob Lawrence, Michael Spafford, and Norman Lundin while at the University of Washington, noting that they "demonstrated that art was something that you do as your life's work." These two were not only mentors to her but considers them life-long friends.

The first in her family to attend college, Thomas began with a vague goal to become a "physical therapist," eventually realizing that a major in art was a possibility.

== Career ==
In addition to working as an artist, Thomas is a writer and arts administrator. Thomas was appointed deputy director of the Northwest African American Museum in 2005, before the museum opened to the public, and moved up to the position of executive director in 2008. Wanting to spend more time on her art, she stepped down from her full-time executive director job in January 2013.

== Artwork ==
Thomas works in many mediums, including egg tempera painting, glass, cut paper, linocut and woodblock prints, sculpture, and installation. Her work is intended to tell stories. In addition to her personal history and experiences, Thomas has described her work as coming from observations of the things where she lives and from the politics that affect her life. She also sees the process of making artwork as creating order in the universe, or as she noted in 1990, as attempts to exert some control over chaos. Thomas's parents drowned in a boating accident in 1998. Even before this tragedy, fishing, long an important family activity, was important in her work. Art Critic Michael Upchurch has described Thomas' iconography as "besieged human figures in loving embrace, crows as trickster-companions-cum-predators, books as capacious homes for the mind to inhabit." Since the late 1990s, her characters, still important in her work, have been increasingly subsumed by landscape, sea, and sky.

== Collections ==
Thomas' work is in the permanent collections of the Seattle Art Museum, the Tacoma Art Museum, the Whatcom Museum and Washington's State Art Collection. She also created "The Story House" (2009), a public art commission at The Evergreen State College in Olympia, Washington that is part of Washington's State Art Collection.

== Books ==
Storm Watch: The Art of Barbara Earl Thomas (published 1998 by University Washington Press)

== Selected solo and group exhibits ==
- Art Center Gallery, Seattle Pacific University, "For Women Who Sleep With Crocodiles", 1983
- Francine Seders Gallery, Seattle: 1984, 1990, 1984, 1998
- Mitchell Museum, Mount Vernon, Illinois: "Talking Back to the Storm: New Figurative Work by Barbara Thomas", 1990
- Whatcom Museum of History and Art, Bellingham, Washington: "Barbara Thomas: The Fallen House", 1994
- Skagit Valley College, Mount Vernon, Washington: "A Fire in the Heart", 1995
- Seattle Art Museum: "Testimonies: Barbara Earle Thomas", 1998
- Bainbridge Island Museum of Art: "Barbara Earl Thomas: Heaven on Fire" (retrospective), 2016
- SCAD Museum of Art, Savannah, GA: "Jacob Lawrence: Lines of Influence," 2017

== Awards ==
- 1998 & 2000: The Seattle Arts Commissions award for new non-fiction
- 2013: Mayor's Arts Award, Seattle
- 2016: Irving and Yvonne Twining Humber Award
- 2016: Washington State Governor's Arts & Heritage Award
