= Juniper Shuey =

Juniper Shuey (born 1974) is a Seattle-based visual artist, known for his video installations and sculptural performance. He is the co-artistic director of zoe|juniper and the head carpenter at the University of Washington Meany Hall.

== Life ==
Juniper Shuey was born in Santa Cruz, California. He was married to Zoe Scofield.

== Background and recognition ==
Prior to his involvement in the visual arts, Shuey spent three years at Emerson College in Boston studying theatrical set design. He then transferred to Ceramics at the University of Washington where the faculty allowed him to develop his art in performance and clay. He has since acted as Set and Lighting Designer for various pieces including Burning Circus' Production of "Emma Goldman; Love, Anarchy, and Other Affairs" at the Fringe Festival in Seattle, Washington, a performance that won the festival for a sold out show. Some of his most popular work was showcased at the Howard House (Seattle) in both 2003 and 2005. Juniper's work has also reached galleries in Palazzo Pio, Rome, and various exhibitions at Soil Art Gallery. Along with his unique and signaturely successful stage sets, Juniper has received the following awards:

- Curators Choice Award – Tacoma Art Museum Northwest Biennial (2004)
- People's Choice Award – Bellevue Arts Museum's Northwest Annual (2000)
- Lambdha Rho Art Honorary – University of Washington School of Art (2000)

His work has been published in several art books including SOIL Artist, Lava, and Fashion is ART. His video installations, photographs and performances have been shown both nationally and internationally including Italy, Budapest, NYC, Houston, Seattle, Portland, and Christchurch, New Zealand. Juniper has participated on several professional panels including New England Foundation for the Arts, The MacArthur Foundation and a professional practices panel discussion at the University of Washington.

== Collaborations ==
His work has been presented at On The Boards, Spectrum Dance Theater, Velocity Dance Center, and the 2005 Northwest New Works Festival where he began his collaboration with performance artist Zoe Scofield and musician Morgan Henderson. At the start of their collaborative relationship they presented their works in visual art galleries, museums, and theaters. They have been commissioned and presented by national and international arts centers such as, On the Boards, PICA, Trafo House of Art, Dance Theater Workshop, Bates Dance Festival, NYLA, Spoleto Festival, Jacob's Pillow, Institute of Contemporary Art Boston, Body Festival (New Zealand), Yerba Buena Center, Columbia College Chicago, DiverseWorks, The Frye Art Museum and many more. They have taught workshops and given lectures on dance, photography, collaboration and installation throughout the US and internationally.
