= List of Winnie-the-Pooh books =

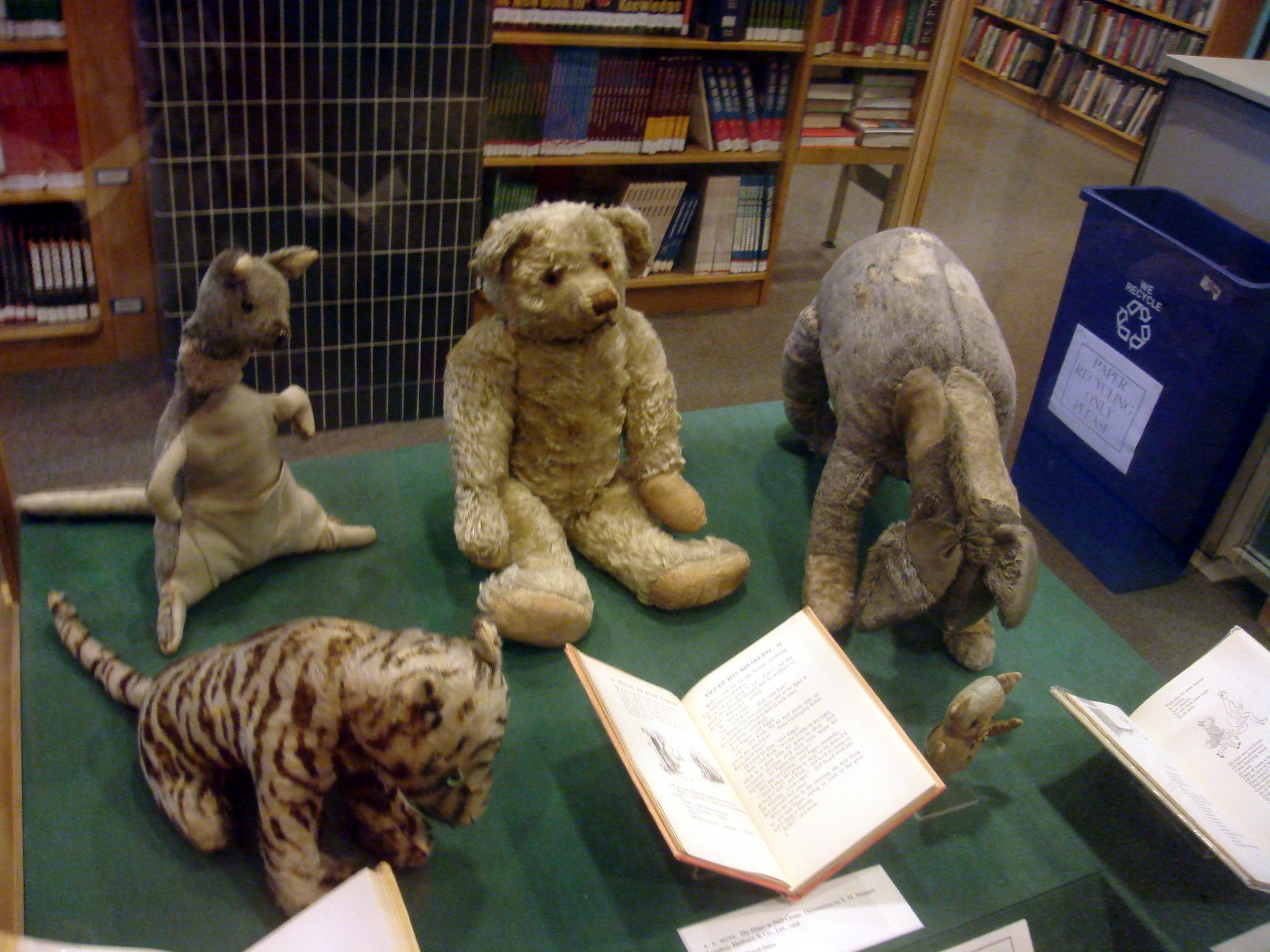
Original Winnie-the-Pooh stuffed toys

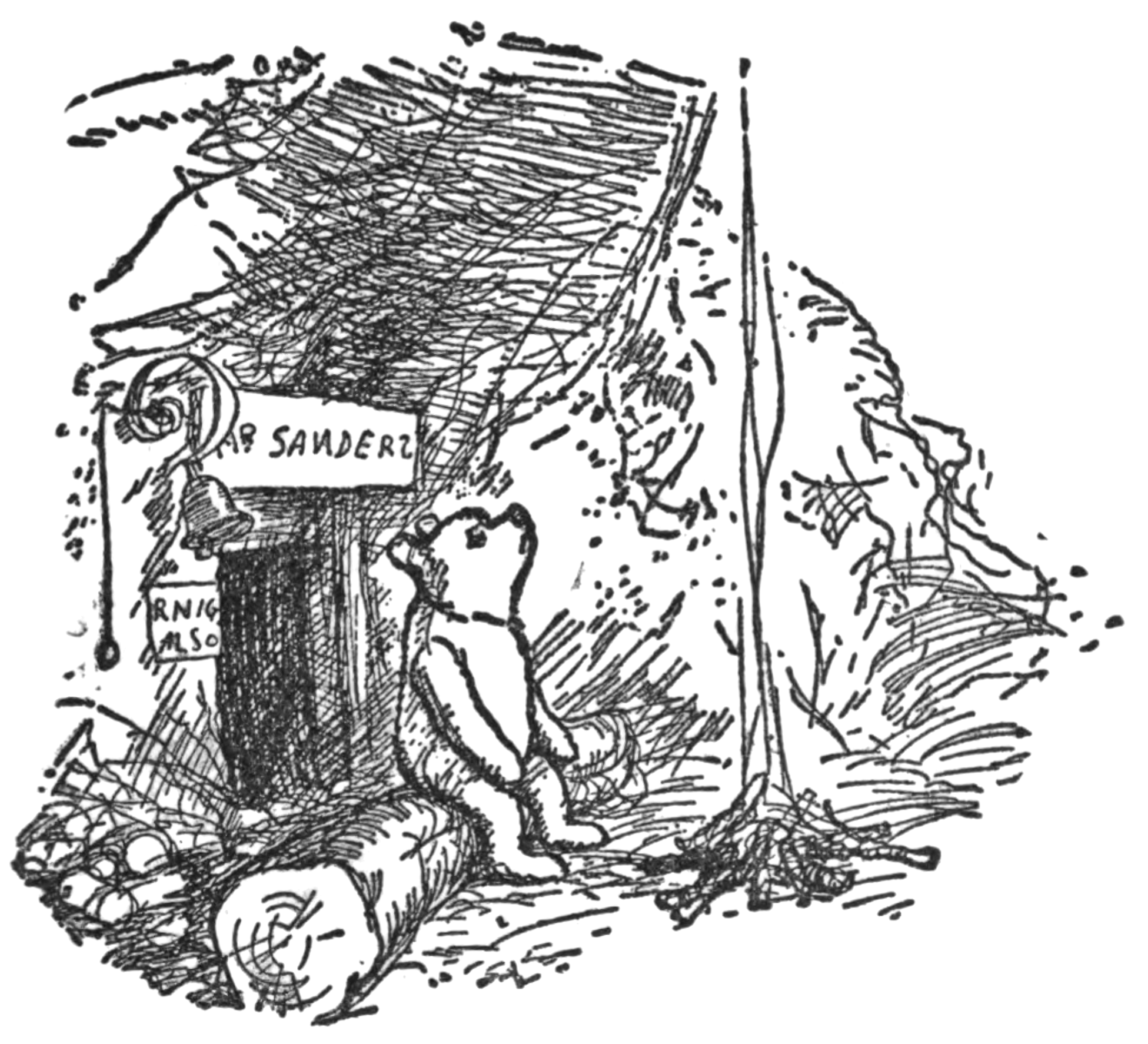
Ernest Shepherd depicts Winnie-the-Pooh, 1926

This list includes books that feature the character Winnie-the-Pooh created by A. A. Milne, as well as related works of analysis, historical context, or other non-fiction.

== By A.A. Milne ==
- When We Were Very Young (1924); the poem "Teddy Bear" within, that originally appeared in Punch in February 1924, is considered to be the first appearance of the character (as "Mr. Edward Bear")
- Winnie-the-Pooh (1926)
- Now We Are Six (1927) contains eleven poems that feature Winnie-the-Pooh illustrations
- The House at Pooh Corner (1928)

== Authorized sequels ==
- Return to the Hundred Acre Wood (2009), the first authorized sequel, by David Benedictus. The illustrations, executed in the style of the originals by E. H. Shepard, are by Mark Burgess.
- Winnie-the-Pooh: The Best Bear in All the World (2016), the second authorized sequel, an anthology of four short stories, each written by a leading children's author: Paul Bright, Jeanne Willis, Kate Saunders, and Brian Sibley. Illustrations are again by Mark Burgess.
- Winnie-the-Pooh Meets the Queen (2016), also published as Winnie-the-Pooh and the Royal Birthday. A short story published in honor of both Winnie the Pooh's and Elizabeth II's 90th birthdays.
- Once There Was a Bear (2021) a prequel novel by Jane Riordan with illustrations by Mark Burgess.
- Winnie-the-Pooh: Tales From the Forest (2023), by Jane Riordan with illustrations by Mark Burgess.
- Winnie-the-Pooh: Winter in the Wood (2024), by Jane Riordan with illustrations by Mark Burgess.
- Winnie-the-Pooh: A Little Boy and His Bear (2026), a forthcoming novel by Jane Riordan with illustrations by Andrew Grey to celebrate the Winnie-the-Pooh centenary.

== Allegory, allusions, and satirical criticism ==
- The Tao of Pooh
- The Te of Piglet
- Pooh and the Philosophers
- The Pooh Perplex
- Finding Winnie

== Other ==
- 2022: The Call of Poohthulhu, an anthology of Lovecraftian horror short stories set in the Winnie-the-Pooh universe

== Translations ==
As of 2021, the Pooh stories have been translated into 72 languages.

- Belarusian: the first translation as Віня-Пых, "Vinya-Pykh", by Vital Voranau was published in 2007, in Poznań, Poland.
- Esperanto: Winnie-La-Pu by Ivy Kellerman Reed and Ralph A. Lewin (1972)
- Hebrew: The first translation was done by Vera Israelit and Eliyahu David Shapir in 1943. At these times, the colloquial Hebrew was in its infancy, and the language of this translation is not well comprehensible for the young Israelis of the 21st century, especially in rendering the British cultural allusions and wordplay. Therefore, Avirama Golan undertook a new translation, published in 2004.
- Latin: by Alexander Lenard, Winnie ille Pu (1958)
- Lithuanian: Pūkuotuko pasaulis: Mikė Pūkuotukas. Trobelė Pūkuotynėje (by Virgilijus Čepaitis, 1958, 1962).
- Polish: There were several translations.
  - 1938: by Irena Tuwim: Kubuś Puchatek and Chatka Puchatka ; considered to be the classical translations
  - Miś Puh-Niedźwiedzki (1943), by Maria Grażyna Ławrukianiec
  - Fredzia Phi-Phi (1986), by Monika Adamczyk (Monika Adamczyk-Garbowska); the change of the gender of the bear (Kubuś is a definitely masculine name, from Jacob, whereas Fredzia is perceived as feminine) caused a major outcry in Poland.
  - Zakątek Fredzi Phi-Phi (1990), (transl. of The House..) by Monika Adamczyk-Garbowska
  - O Kubusiu Puchatku (1993), by Agnieszka Traut
  - Kubuś Puchatek (1994), by Bohdan Drozdowski
- Russian: "retold by" (Note: Boris Zakhoder insisted that his Pooh books were subtitled "retold by Boris Zakhoder") Boris Zakhoder, Винни-Пух и все остальные (literally "Winnie-the-Pooh and Everybody Else") (1960), later renamed to Винни-Пух и все-все-все (literally "Winnie-the-Pooh and All-All-All")

== See also ==
- List of Winnie-the-Pooh characters
