= Winnie-the-Pooh =

Fictional character by A. A. Milne

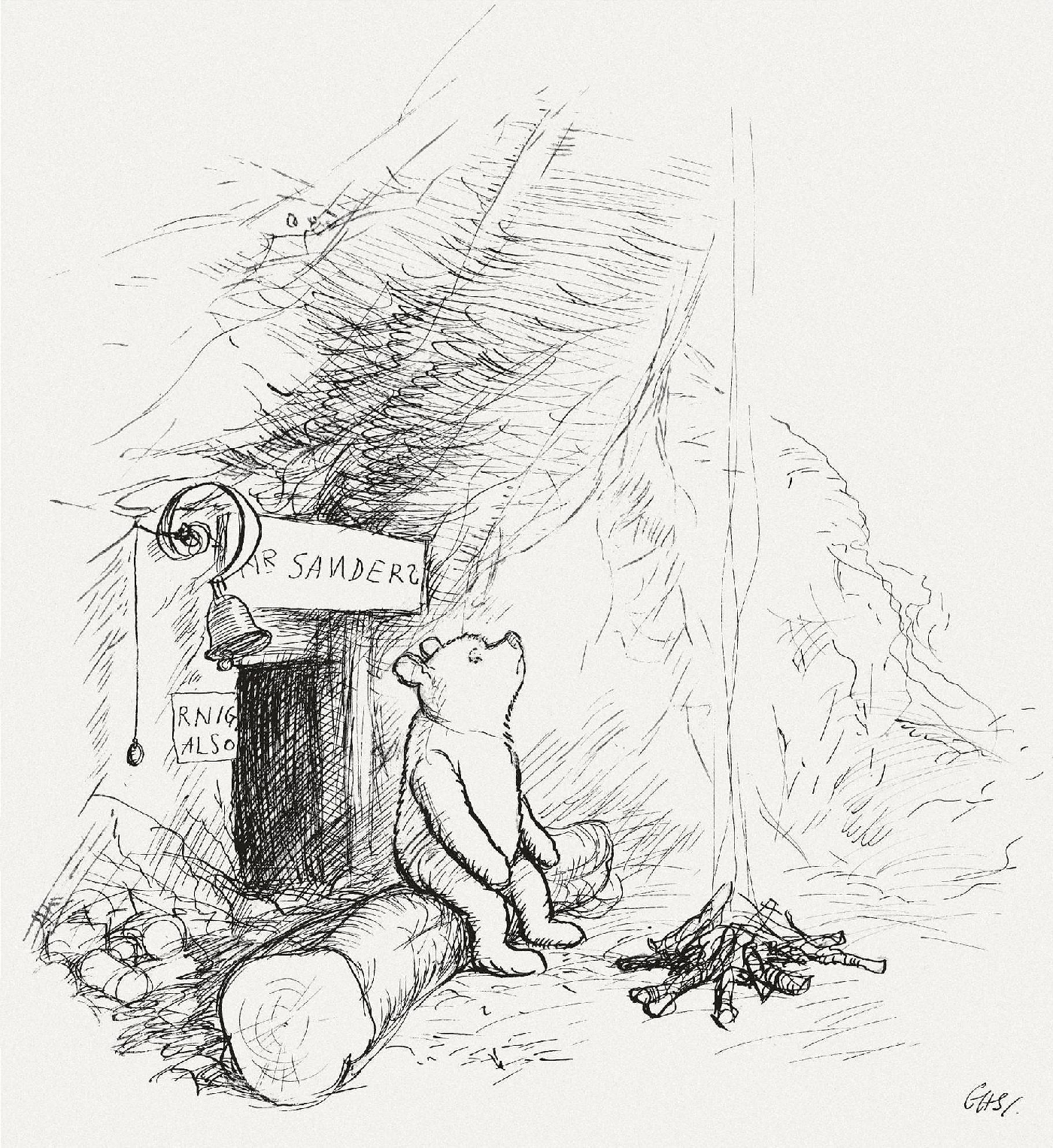
- An early illustration by E. H. Shepard
- First appearance: When We Were Very Young (1924; as Edward Bear); Winnie-the-Pooh (1926)
- Created by: A. A. Milne; E. H. Shepard
- Based on: Winnie the bear (name)

In-universe information
- Nicknames: Pooh Bear; Pooh
- Species: Teddy bear
- Gender: Male
- Home: Hundred Acre Wood

Winnie-the-Pooh (also known as Edward Bear, Pooh Bear or simply Pooh) is a fictional anthropomorphic teddy bear created by the English author A. A. Milne and the English illustrator E. H. Shepard. Winnie-the-Pooh first appeared by name in a children's story commissioned by London's Evening News for Christmas Eve 1925. The character is inspired by a stuffed toy that Milne had bought for his son Christopher Robin in Harrods department store, and a bear named Winnie they had viewed at London Zoo.

The first collection of stories about the character is the book Winnie-the-Pooh (1926), and this was followed by The House at Pooh Corner (1928). Milne also included a poem about the bear in the children's verse book When We Were Very Young (1924) and many more in Now We Are Six (1927). All four volumes were illustrated by E. H. Shepard. The stories are set in and around the Hundred Acre Wood, which was inspired by Five Hundred Acre Wood in Ashdown Forest in East Sussex—situated 30 miles (48 km) south of London—where the Londoner Milne's country home was located.

The Pooh stories have been translated into many languages, including Alexander Lenard's Latin translation, Winnie ille Pu, which was first published in 1958 and in 1960 became the only Latin book ever to be featured on The New York Times Best Seller list. The original English manuscripts are held at the Wren Library in Trinity College, Cambridge (Milne's alma mater), to which he had bequeathed the works. The first Pooh book was ranked number 7 on the BBC's The Big Read poll.

In 1961, The Walt Disney Company licensed certain films and other rights of the Winnie-the-Pooh stories from the estate of A. A. Milne and the licensing agent Stephen Slesinger, Inc., and adapted the Pooh stories, using the unhyphenated name "Winnie the Pooh", into a series of features that would eventually become one of its most successful franchises. In popular film adaptations, Pooh has been voiced by the actors Sterling Holloway, Hal Smith, and Jim Cummings in English, and Yevgeny Leonov in Russian.

== History ==
=== Origin ===
A. A. Milne with his son Christopher Robin Milne and Pooh Bear in 1926, the year Winnie-the-Pooh was published

A. A. Milne named the character Winnie-the-Pooh after a teddy bear owned by his son, Christopher Robin Milne, on whom the character Christopher Robin was based. Milne had bought the toy bear in 1921 from Harrods department store in London. E. H. Shepard, in turn, based his illustrations of Pooh on his own son's teddy bear named Growler, instead of Christopher Robin's bear. The rest of Christopher Milne's toys – Piglet, Eeyore, Kanga, Roo, and Tigger – were incorporated into Milne's stories. Two more characters, Owl and Rabbit, were created by Milne's imagination. Gopher was created for the Disney-produced films.

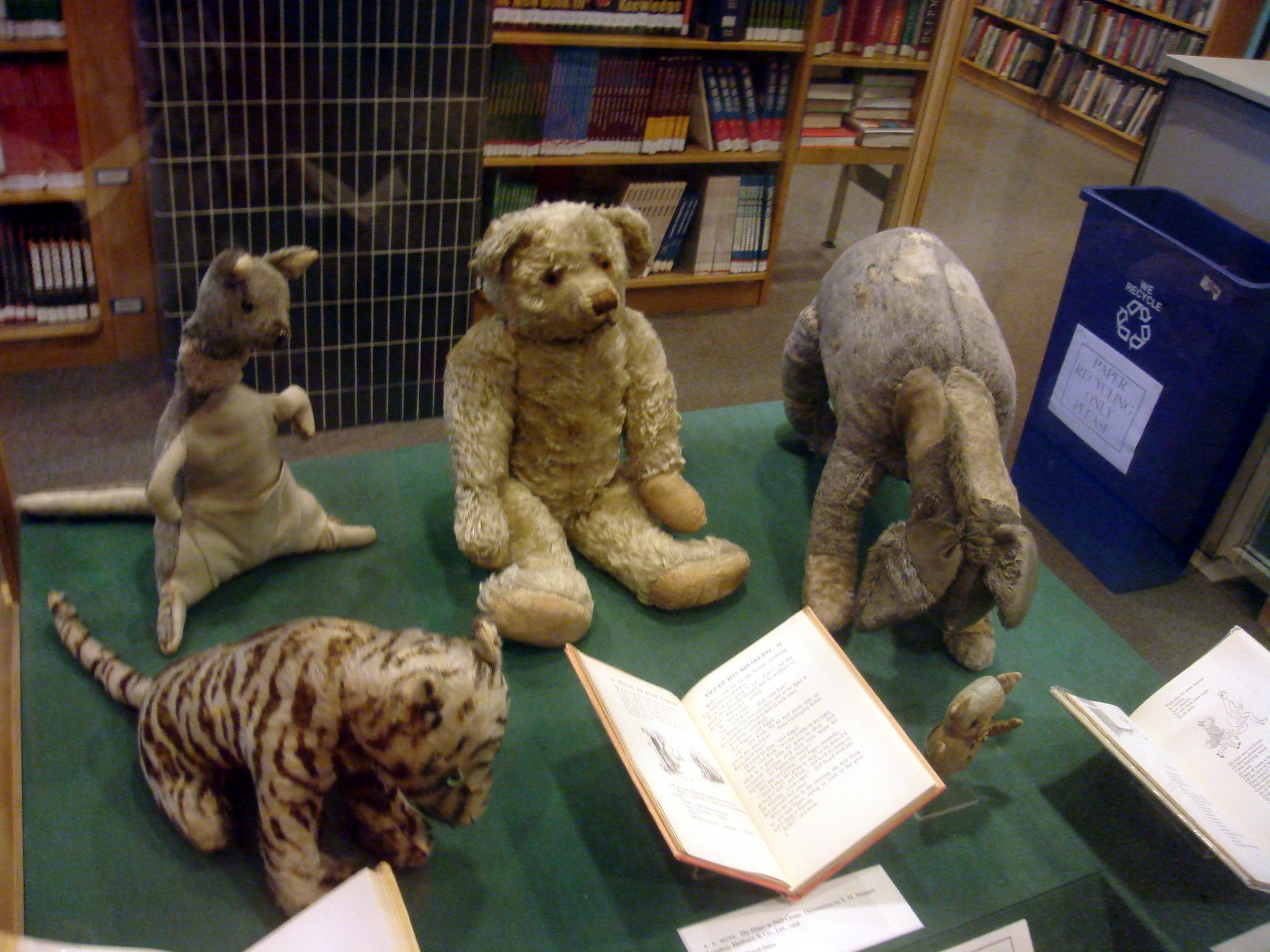
Christopher Robin's original Winnie-the-Pooh stuffed toys, on display at the New York Public Library (clockwise from bottom left: Tigger, Kanga, Edward Bear ("Winnie-the-Pooh"), Eeyore, and Piglet). Roo was also one of the original toys, but was lost by Christopher Robin in the 1930s.

In 1947, the toys came to the US in the custody of Milne's US publisher, with whom they remained until 1987. The publisher then donated the toys to the Main Branch of the New York Public Library in New York City where they have been on display ever since. In April 2026, during a state visit to the United States, Queen Camilla donated a replica Roo (the original one was lost in the 1930s) to the Library to complete the collection.

Christopher Robin had named his toy bear Edward, then Winnie, after a Canadian black bear Winnie that he often saw at London Zoo, and Pooh, a friend's pet swan they had encountered while on holiday. The bear cub was purchased from a hunter for C$20 by Canadian Lieutenant Harry Colebourn in White River, Ontario, while en route to England during the First World War. Colebourn, a veterinary officer with the Fort Garry Horse cavalry regiment, named the bear Winnie after his adopted hometown in Winnipeg, Manitoba. Winnie was surreptitiously brought to England with her owner, and gained unofficial recognition as The Fort Garry Horse regimental mascot. Colebourn left Winnie at the London Zoo while he and his unit were in France; after the war she was officially donated to the zoo, as she had become a much-loved attraction there. Pooh the swan appears as a character in its own right in When We Were Very Young.

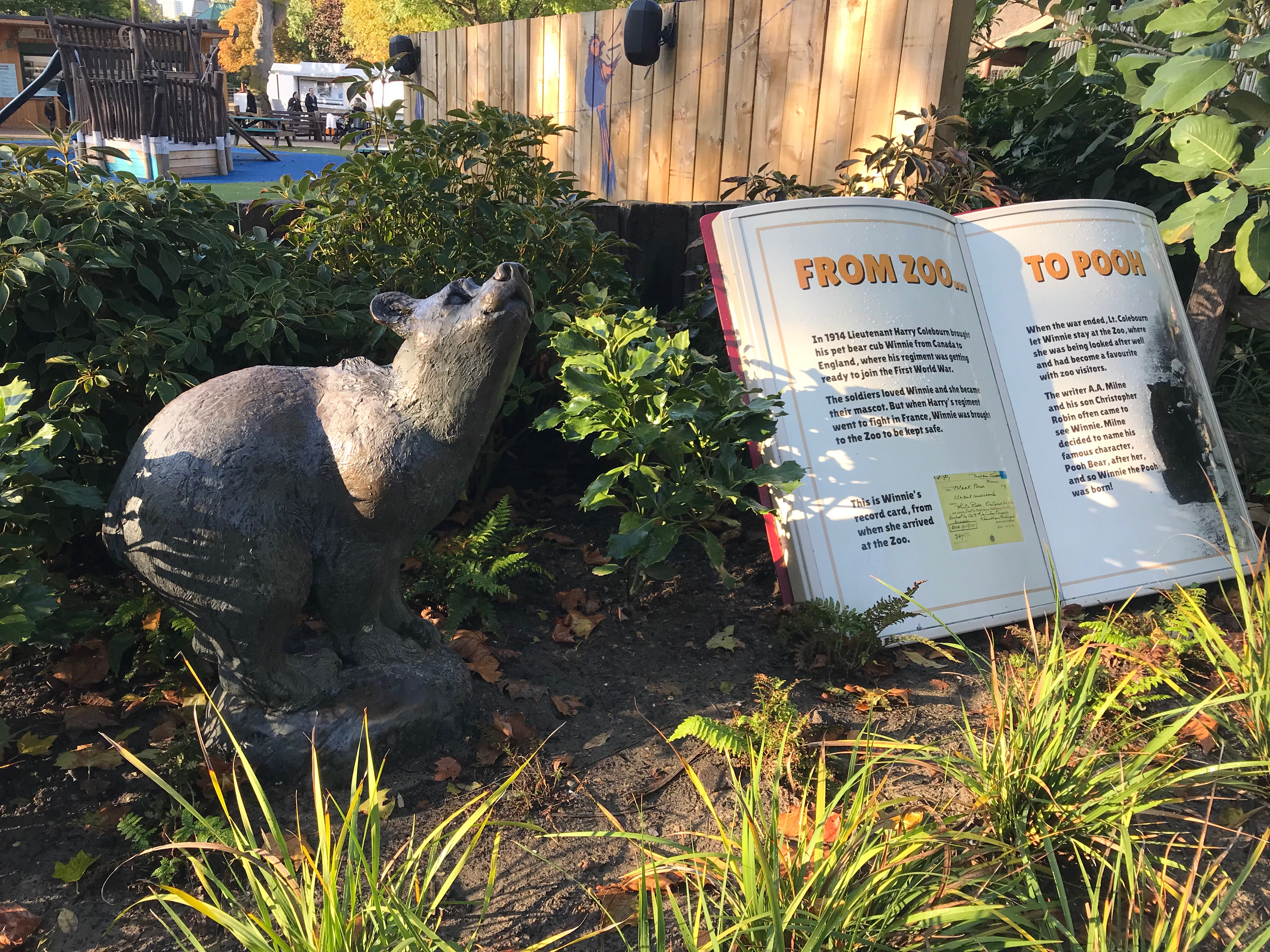
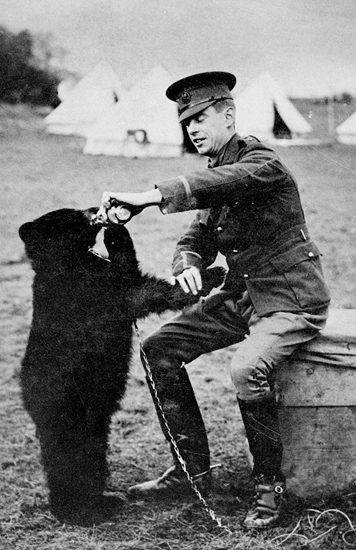
Left: Sculpture at London Zoo where Milne took his son Christopher Robin to see Winnie, and right: Harry Colebourn and Winnie in 1914

In the first chapter of Winnie-the-Pooh, Milne offers this explanation of why Winnie-the-Pooh is often simply known as "Pooh":

But his arms were so stiff … they stayed up straight in the air for more than a week, and whenever a fly came and settled on his nose he had to blow it off. And I think – but I am not sure – that that is why he is always called Pooh.

American writer William Safire surmised that the Milnes' invention of the name "Winnie the Pooh" may have also been influenced by the haughty character Pooh-Bah in Gilbert and Sullivan's The Mikado (1885).

A bronze sculpture of Winnie as a young cub, created by Lorne McKean, was unveiled at London Zoo in September 1981 by Christopher Robin. The skull of Winnie is displayed at the Hunterian Museum in London, the location of anatomical exhibits of the Royal College of Surgeons of England, with a 2015 examination of the skull showing that she suffered from chronic periodontitis, an inflammation and loss of connective tissues supporting or surrounding the teeth, which can be caused by poor diet, such as the honey Christopher Robin spoon fed her.

=== Ashdown Forest: the setting for the stories ===
The Winnie-the-Pooh stories are set in "the Forest", patterned after Ashdown Forest, East Sussex, England. The forest is an area of tranquil open heathland on the highest sandy ridges of the High Weald Area of Outstanding Natural Beauty situated 30 miles (50 km) south-east of London. In 1925 Milne, a Londoner, bought a country home a mile to the north of the forest at Cotchford Farm, near Hartfield. According to Christopher Robin Milne, while his father continued to live in London "...the four of us – he, his wife, his son and his son's nanny – would pile into a large blue, chauffeur-driven Fiat and travel down every Saturday morning and back again every Monday afternoon. And we would spend a whole glorious month there in the spring and two months in the summer." From the front lawn the family had a view across a meadow to a line of alders that fringed the River Medway, beyond which the ground rose through more trees until finally "above them, in the faraway distance, crowning the view, was a bare hilltop. In the centre of this hilltop was a clump of pines." Most of his father's visits to the forest at that time were, he noted, family expeditions on foot "to make yet another attempt to count the pine trees on Gill's Lap or to search for the marsh gentian". Christopher added that, inspired by Ashdown Forest, his father had made it "the setting for two of his books, finishing the second little over three years after his arrival".

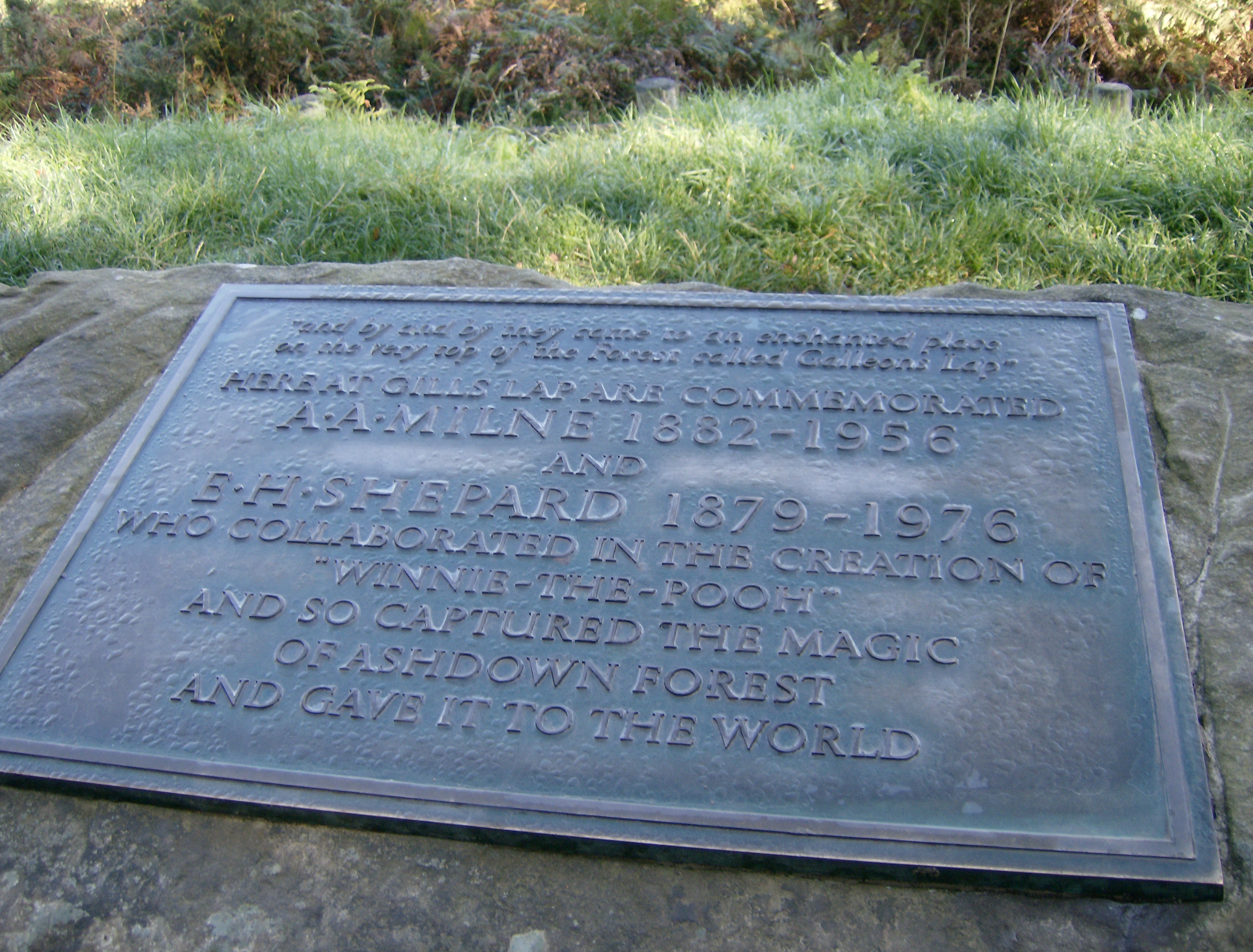
A. A. Milne and E. H. Shepard memorial plaque at Ashdown Forest, East Sussex, south-east England; it overlooks Five Hundred Acre Wood, the setting for Winnie-the-Pooh

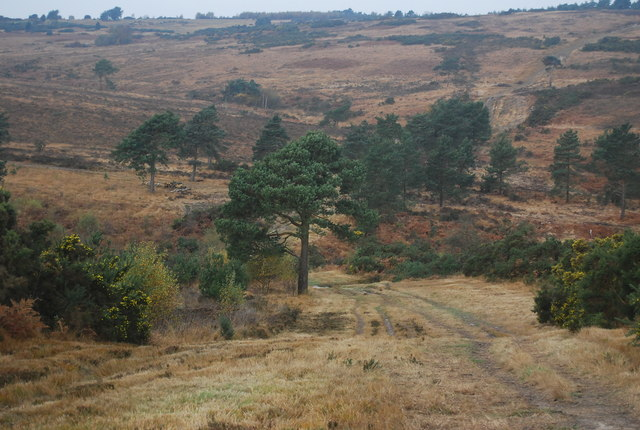
Ashdown Forest

Many locations in the stories can be associated with real places in and around the forest. As Christopher Milne wrote in his autobiography: "Pooh's forest and Ashdown Forest are identical." For example, the fictional "Hundred Acre Wood" was in reality Five Hundred Acre Wood; Galleon's Leap was inspired by the prominent hilltop of Gill's Lap, while a clump of trees just north of Gill's Lap became Christopher Robin's The Enchanted Place, because no-one had ever been able to count whether there were 63 or 64 trees in the circle.

The landscapes depicted in E. H. Shepard's illustrations for the Winnie-the-Pooh books were directly inspired by the distinctive landscape of Ashdown Forest, with its high, open heathlands of heather, gorse, bracken and silver birch, which are punctuated by hilltop clumps of pine trees. Many of Shepard's illustrations can be matched to actual views, allowing for a degree of artistic licence. Shepard's sketches of pine trees and other forest scenes are held at the Victoria and Albert Museum in London.

The game of Poohsticks was originally played by Christopher Robin Milne and his father on the wooden footbridge, across the Millbrook, Posingford Wood, close to Cotchford Farm. In the stories Pooh plays the game with the other characters, Christopher Robin, Tigger, and Eeyore. The location is now a tourist attraction, and it has become traditional to play the game there using sticks gathered in the nearby woodland. When the footbridge had to be replaced in 1999, the architect used as a main source drawings by Shepard in the books, and retained its precursor's original style.

=== First publication ===
Winnie-the-Pooh's debut in the 24 December 1925 London Evening News

Christopher Robin's teddy bear made his character début, under the name Edward, in A. A. Milne's poem "Teddy Bear", in the edition of 13 February 1924 of Punch (E. H. Shepard had also included a similar bear in a cartoon published in Punch the previous week), and the same poem was published in Milne's book of children's verse When We Were Very Young (6 November 1924). Winnie-the-Pooh first appeared by name on 24 December 1925, in a Christmas story commissioned and published by the London newspaper Evening News. It was illustrated by J. H. Dowd.

The first collection of Pooh stories appeared in the book Winnie-the-Pooh. The Evening News Christmas story reappeared as the first chapter of the book. At the beginning, it explained that Pooh was in fact Christopher Robin's Edward Bear, who had been renamed by the boy. He was renamed after an American black bear at London Zoo called Winnie who got her name from the fact that her owner had come from Winnipeg, Canada. The book was published on 14 October 1926 by the publisher of Milne's earlier children's work, Methuen, in England, E. P. Dutton in the US, and McClelland & Stewart in Canada. It was an immediate critical and commercial success. The children's author and literary critic John Rowe Townsend described Winnie-the-Pooh and its sequel The House at Pooh Corner as "the spectacular British success of the 1920s" and praised its light, readable prose.

=== Appearance ===
The original drawing of Pooh was based not on Christopher Robin's bear, but on Growler, the teddy bear belonging to Shepard's son Graham, according to James Campbell, husband of Shepard's great-granddaughter. When Campbell took over Shepard's estate in 2010, he discovered many drawings and unpublished writings, including early drawings of Pooh, that had not been seen in decades. Campbell said, "Both he and A. A. Milne realised that Christopher Robin's bear was too gruff-looking, not very cuddly, so they decided they would have to have a different bear for the illustrations." Campbell said Shepard sent Milne a drawing of his son's bear and that Milne "said it was perfect". Campbell also said Shepard's drawings of Christopher Robin were based partly on his own son.

=== Character ===
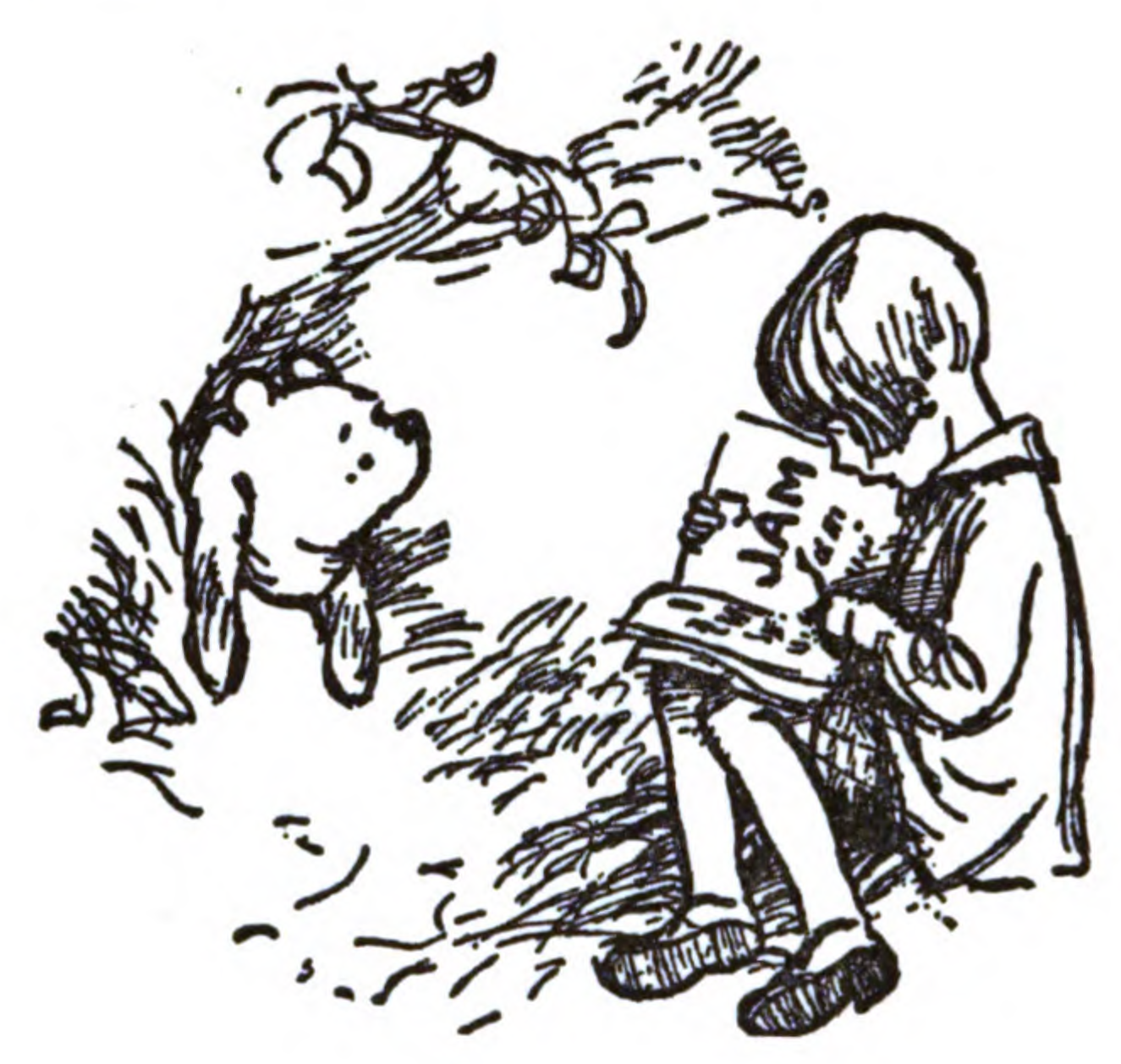
Pooh listening to Christopher Robin, Winnie-the-Pooh (1926); illustration by E. H. Shepard.

In the Milne books, Pooh is naive and slow-witted, but he is also friendly, thoughtful, and steadfast. Although he and his friends agree that he is "a bear of very little brain", Pooh is occasionally acknowledged to have a clever idea, usually driven by common sense. These include riding in Christopher Robin's umbrella to rescue Piglet from a flood, discovering "the North Pole" by picking it up to help fish Roo out of the river, inventing the game of Poohsticks, and getting Eeyore out of the river by dropping a large rock on one side of him to wash him towards the bank.

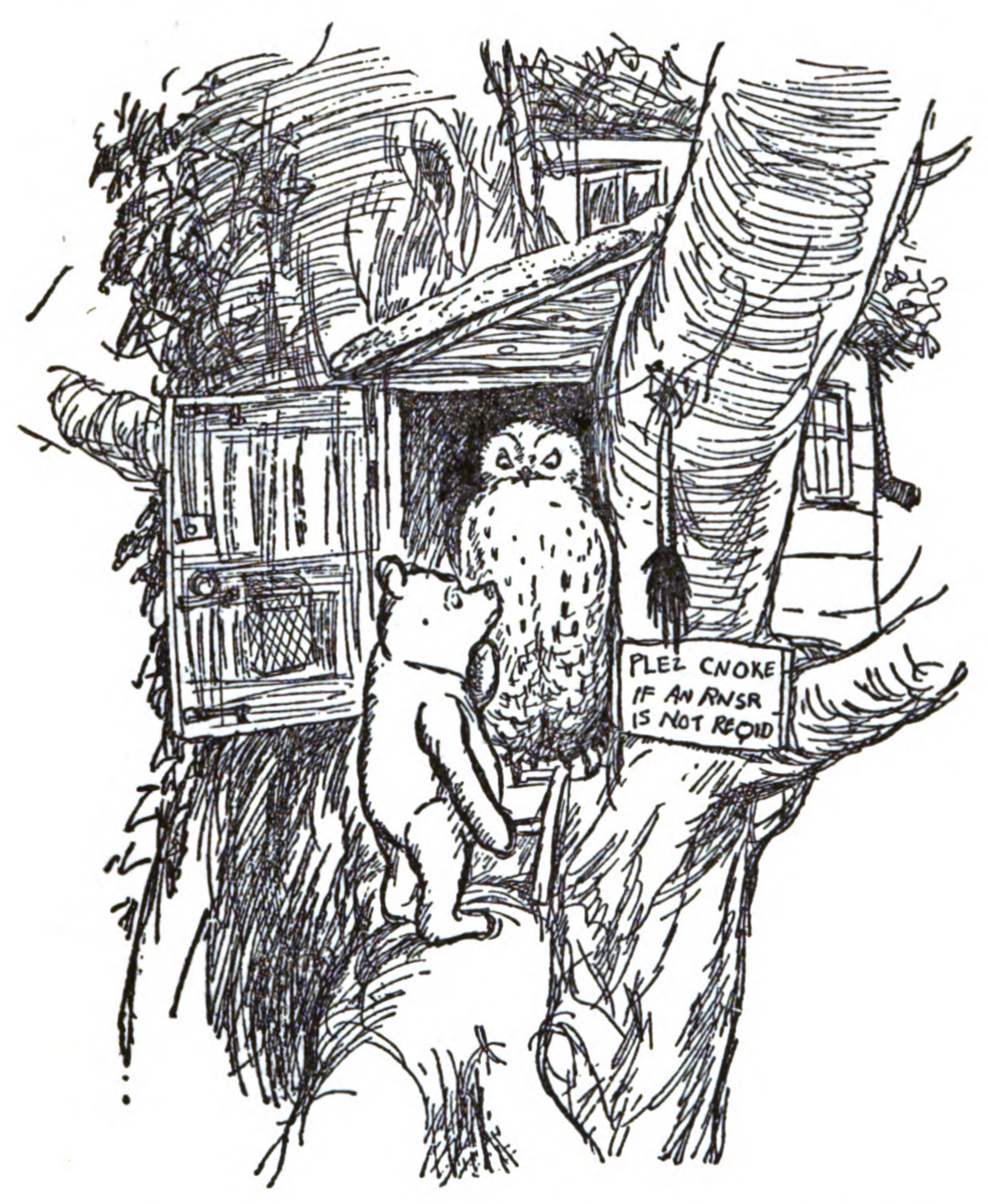
Pooh at Owl's house; illustration by E. H. Shepard

Pooh is also a talented poet and the stories are frequently punctuated by his poems and "hums". Although he is humble about his slow-wittedness, he is comfortable with his creative gifts. When Owl's house blows down in a windstorm, trapping Pooh, Piglet and Owl inside, Pooh encourages Piglet (the only one small enough to do so) to escape and rescue them all by promising that "a respectful Pooh song" will be written about Piglet's feat. Later, Pooh muses about the creative process as he composes the song.

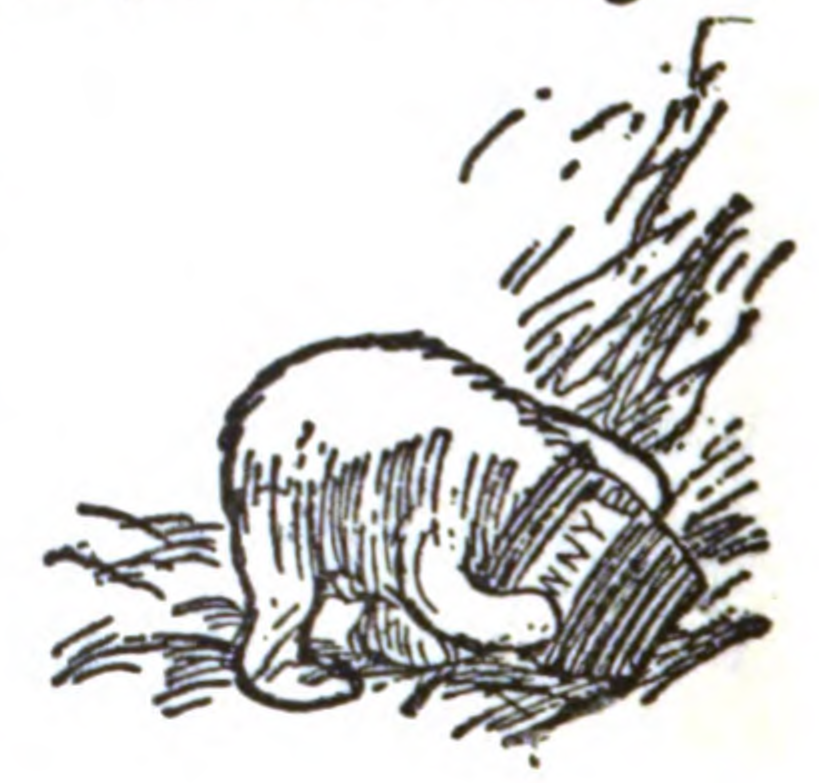
Pooh and a honey ("hunny") pot, E. H. Shepard illustration from Winnie-the-Pooh (1926)

Pooh is very fond of food, particularly honey (which he spells "hunny"), but also condensed milk and other items. When he visits friends, his desire to be offered a snack is in conflict with the impoliteness of asking too directly. Though intent on giving Eeyore a pot of honey for his birthday, Pooh could not resist eating it on his way to deliver the present and so instead gives Eeyore "a useful pot to put things in". When he and Piglet are lost in the forest during Rabbit's attempt to "unbounce" Tigger, Pooh finds his way home by following the "call" of the honeypots from his house. Pooh makes it a habit to have "a little something" around 11:00 in the morning. As the clock in his house "stopped at five minutes to eleven some weeks ago", any time can be Pooh's snack time.

Pooh is very social. After Christopher Robin, his closest friend is Piglet, and he most often chooses to spend his time with one or both of them. But he also habitually visits the other animals, often looking for a snack or an audience for his poetry as much as for companionship. His kind-heartedness means he goes out of his way to be friendly to Eeyore, visiting him and bringing him a birthday present and building him a house, despite receiving mostly disdain from Eeyore in return. Devan Coggan of Entertainment Weekly saw a similarity between Pooh and Paddington Bear, two "extremely polite British bears without pants", adding that "both bears share a philosophy of kindness and integrity".

=== Posthumous sequels ===
An authorised sequel Return to the Hundred Acre Wood was published on 5 October 2009. The author, David Benedictus, has developed, but not changed, Milne's characterisations. The illustrations, by Mark Burgess, are in the style of Shepard.

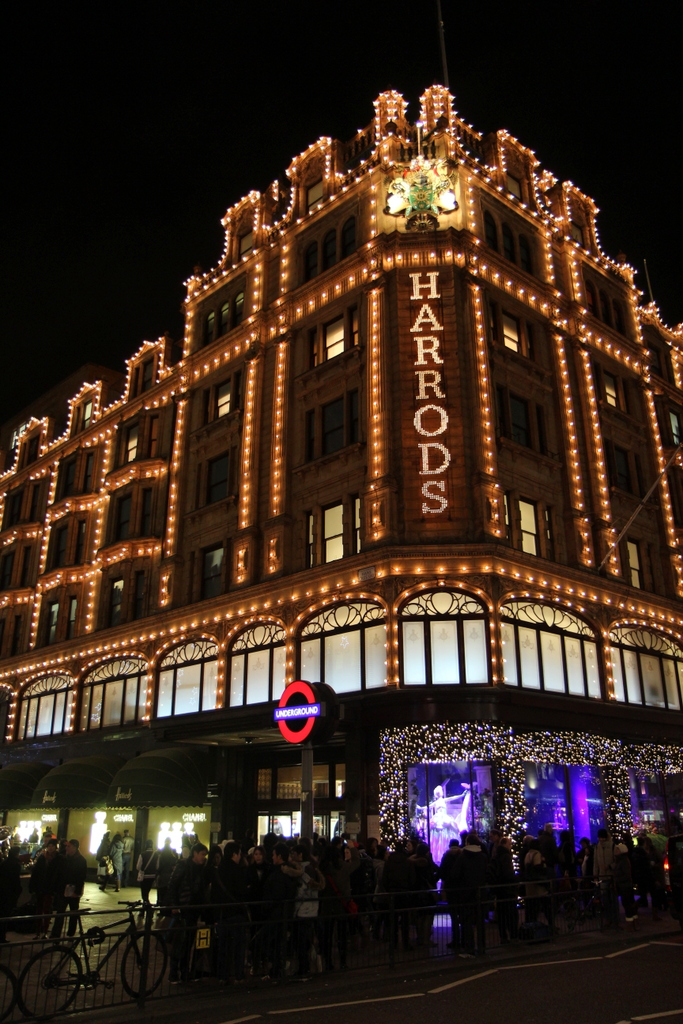
Harrods department store in Knightsbridge, London, where in 1921 Milne bought the stuffed toy for his son that would inspire the character. Pooh visits Harrods in the 2021 authorised prequel Winnie-the-Pooh: Once There Was a Bear

Another authorised sequel, Winnie-the-Pooh: The Best Bear in All the World, was published by Egmont in 2016. The sequel consists of four short stories by four leading children's authors, Kate Saunders, Brian Sibley, Paul Bright, and Jeanne Willis. Illustrations are by Mark Burgess. The Best Bear in All The World sees the introduction of a new character, Penguin, which was inspired by a long-lost photograph of Milne and his son Christopher with a toy penguin.

In 2016, Winnie-the-Pooh Meets the Queen was published to mark the 90th anniversary of Milne's creation and the 90th birthday of Queen Elizabeth II. It sees Pooh meet the Queen at Buckingham Palace.

In 2021, marking a century since Milne bought the stuffed toy from Harrods department store for his son Christopher Robin that would inspire Milne to create the character, Winnie-the-Pooh: Once There Was a Bear, the first prequel to Milne's books and poetry about the bear, was authorised by the estates of Milne and Shepard. Inspired by the real life of Christopher Robin, it is written by children's writer Jane Riordan in the style of Milne, with illustrations by Mark Burgess emulating the drawings of Shepard. It sees Winnie-the-Pooh exploring Harrods as well as visit London's Natural History Museum and London Zoo, before leaving London and going back to the Hundred Acre Wood.

=== Stephen Slesinger ===
On 6 January 1930, Stephen Slesinger purchased US and Canadian merchandising, television, recording, and other trade rights to the Winnie-the-Pooh works from Milne for a $1,000 advance and 66% of Slesinger's income. By November 1931, Pooh was a $50 million-a-year business. Slesinger marketed Pooh and his friends for more than 30 years, creating the first Pooh doll, record, board game, puzzle, US radio broadcast (on NBC), animation, and motion picture.

=== Red shirt Pooh ===
The first time Pooh and his friends appeared in colour was 1932, when he was drawn by Slesinger in his now-familiar red shirt and featured on an RCA Victor picture record. Parker Brothers introduced A. A. Milne's Winnie-the-Pooh Game in 1933, again with Pooh in his red shirt. In the 1940s, Agnes Brush created the first plush dolls with Pooh in a shirt.

=== Disney exclusivity (1961–2021) ===
Disney's illustration of Winnie the Pooh

After Slesinger's death in 1953, his wife, Shirley Slesinger Lasswell, continued developing the character herself. In 1961, she licensed rights to Walt Disney Productions in exchange for royalties in the first of two agreements between Stephen Slesinger, Inc., and Disney. The same year, A. A. Milne's widow, Daphne Milne, also licensed certain rights, including motion picture rights, to Disney. In 2001, Disney bought full rights to the character until 2026 from A. A. Milne's estate.

Since 1966, Disney has released numerous animated productions starring its version of Winnie the Pooh and related characters, starting with the theatrical featurette Winnie the Pooh and the Honey Tree. This was followed by Winnie the Pooh and the Blustery Day (1968), and Winnie the Pooh and Tigger Too (1974). These three featurettes were combined into a feature-length film, The Many Adventures of Winnie the Pooh, in 1977. A fourth featurette, Winnie the Pooh and a Day for Eeyore, was released in 1983.

A new series of Winnie the Pooh theatrical feature-length films launched in the 2000s, with The Tigger Movie (2000), Piglet's Big Movie (2003), Pooh's Heffalump Movie (2005), Winnie the Pooh (2011), and Christopher Robin (2018). Disney has also produced television series based on the franchise, including Welcome to Pooh Corner (Disney Channel, 1983–1986), The New Adventures of Winnie the Pooh (ABC, 1988–1991), The Book of Pooh (Playhouse Disney, 2001–2003), and My Friends Tigger & Pooh (Playhouse Disney, 2007–2010).

A. A. Milne's U.S. copyright on the Winnie-the-Pooh character expired on 1 January 2022, as it had been 95 years since publication of the first story. The character has thus entered the public domain in the United States and Disney no longer holds exclusive rights there. Independent filmmaker Rhys Frake-Waterfield capitalized on this shortly thereafter by producing a horror film titled Winnie-the-Pooh: Blood and Honey. The UK copyright will expire on 1 January 2027, the first day of the first calendar year which is at least 70 years after Milne's death.

Playdate with Winnie the Pooh, an animated series of musical shorts by OddBot Inc. for Disney Junior, became the first project from Disney to be released after the original book and characters became public domain.

=== Merchandising revenue dispute ===
Pooh videos, soft toys, and other merchandise generate substantial annual revenues for Disney. The size of Pooh stuffed toys ranges from Beanie and miniature to human-sized. In addition to the stylised Disney Pooh, Disney markets Classic Pooh merchandise which more closely resembles E. H. Shepard's illustrations.

In 1991, Stephen Slesinger, Inc., filed a lawsuit against Disney which alleged that Disney had breached their 1983 agreement by again failing to accurately report revenue from Winnie the Pooh sales. Under this agreement, Disney was to retain approximately 98% of gross worldwide revenues while the remaining 2% was to be paid to Slesinger. In addition, the suit alleged that Disney had failed to pay required royalties on all commercial exploitation of the product name. Though the Disney corporation was sanctioned by a judge for destroying forty boxes of evidentiary documents, the suit was later terminated by another judge when it was discovered that Slesinger's investigator had rummaged through Disney's garbage to retrieve the discarded evidence. Slesinger appealed the termination and, on 26 September 2007, a three-judge panel upheld the lawsuit dismissal.

After the Copyright Term Extension Act of 1998, Clare Milne, Christopher Robin Milne's daughter, attempted to terminate any future US copyrights for Stephen Slesinger, Inc. After a series of legal hearings, Judge Florence-Marie Cooper of the US District Court in California found in favour of Stephen Slesinger, Inc., as did the United States Court of Appeals for the Ninth Circuit. On 26 June 2006, the US Supreme Court refused to hear the case, sustaining the ruling and ensuring the defeat of the suit.

On 19 February 2007, Disney lost a court case in Los Angeles which ruled their "misguided claims" to dispute the licensing agreements with Slesinger, Inc., were unjustified, but a federal ruling of 28 September 2009, again from Judge Florence-Marie Cooper, determined that the Slesinger family had granted all trademarks and copyrights to Disney, although Disney must pay royalties for all future use of the characters. Both parties expressed satisfaction with the outcome.

== Other adaptations ==
=== Theatre ===
- 1931. Winnie-the-Pooh at the Guild Theater, Sue Hastings Marionettes
- 1957. Winnie-the-Pooh, a play in three acts, dramatized by Kristin Sergel, Dramatic Publishing
- 1964. Winnie-the-Pooh, a musical comedy in two acts, lyrics by A. A. Milne and Kristin Sergel, music by Allan Jay Friedman, book by Kristin Sergel, Dramatic Publishing
- 1977. A Winnie-the-Pooh Christmas Tail, in which Winnie-the-Pooh and his friends help Eeyore have a very Merry Christmas (or a very happy birthday), with the book, music, and lyrics by James W. Rogers, Dramatic Publishing
- 1986. Bother! The Brain of Pooh, Peter Dennis
- 1992. Winnie-the-Pooh, small cast musical version, dramatized by le Clanché du Rand, music by Allan Jay Friedman, lyrics by A. A. Milne and Kristin Sergel, additional lyrics by le Clanché du Rand, Dramatic Publishing
- 2021. Winnie the Pooh: The New Musical Adaptation

=== Audio ===
RCA Victor record from 1932 decorated with Stephen Slesinger, Inc.'s Winnie-the-Pooh

Selected Pooh stories read by Maurice Evans released on vinyl LP:

- 1956. Winnie-the-Pooh (consisting of three tracks: "Introducing Winnie-the-Pooh and Christopher Robin"; "Pooh Goes Visiting and Gets into a Tight Place"; and "Pooh and Piglet Go Hunting and Nearly Catch a Woozle")
- More Winnie-the-Pooh (consisting of three tracks: "Eeyore Loses a Tail"; "Piglet Meets a Heffalump"; "Eeyore Has a Birthday")

In 1951, RCA Records released four stories of Winnie-the-Pooh, narrated by Jimmy Stewart and featuring the voices of Cecil Roy as Pooh, Madeleine Pierce as Piglet, Betty Jane Tyler as Kanga, Merrill Joels as Eeyore, Arnold Stang as Rabbit, Frank Milano as Owl, and Sandy Fussell as Christopher Robin.

In 1960, His Master's Voice recorded a dramatised version with songs (music by Harold Fraser-Simson) of two episodes from The House at Pooh Corner (Chapters 2 and 8), starring Ian Carmichael as Pooh, Denise Bryer as Christopher Robin (who also narrated), Hugh Lloyd as Tigger, Penny Morrell as Piglet, and Terry Norris as Eeyore. This was released on a 45 rpm EP.

In the 1970s and 1980s, Carol Channing recorded Winnie the Pooh, The House at Pooh Corner and The Winnie the Pooh Songbook, with music by Don Heckman. These were released on vinyl LP and audio cassette by Caedmon Records.

Unabridged recordings read by Peter Dennis of the four Pooh books:

- When We Were Very Young
- Winnie-the-Pooh
- Now We Are Six
- The House at Pooh Corner

In 1979, a double audio cassette set of Winnie the Pooh was produced featuring British actor Lionel Jeffries reading all of the characters in the stories. This was followed in 1981 by an audio cassette set of stories from The House at Pooh Corner also read by Lionel Jeffries.

In the 1990s, the stories were dramatised for audio by David Benedictus, with music composed, directed and played by John Gould. They were performed by a cast that included Stephen Fry as Winnie-the-Pooh, Jane Horrocks as Piglet, Geoffrey Palmer as Eeyore, Judi Dench as Kanga, Finty Williams as Roo, Robert Daws as Rabbit, Michael Williams as Owl, Steven Webb as Christopher Robin and Sandi Toksvig as Tigger.

==== Radio ====
- The BBC included readings of Winnie-the-Pooh stories in its programmes for children very soon after their first publication. One of the earliest of such readings, by "Uncle Peter" (C. E. Hodges), was an item in the programme For the Children, broadcast by stations 2LO and 5XX on 23 March 1926. Norman Shelley was the notable voice of Pooh on the BBC's Children's Hour.
- Pooh made his US radio debut on 10 November 1932, when he was broadcast to 40,000 schools by The American School of the Air, the educational division of the Columbia Broadcasting System.

=== Film ===
- 2017: Goodbye Christopher Robin, a British drama film exploring the creation of Winnie-the-Pooh with Domhnall Gleeson playing A. A. Milne.
- 2023: Winnie-the-Pooh: Blood and Honey, a horror adaptation depicting both Winnie-the-Pooh and Piglet as homicidal maniacs who go on a killing spree after Christopher Robin abandons them. This is the first Pooh adaptation in The Twisted Childhood Universe; two subsequent films are:
  - 2024: Winnie-the-Pooh: Blood and Honey 2: Pooh and Piglet team up with Owl and Tigger to target the town of Ashdown after Christopher exposed their existence following the events of the first film.
  - TBA: Winnie-the-Pooh: Blood and Honey 3: On 28 March 2024, a third film in the Blood and Honey series was announced.

==== Soviet adaptation ====
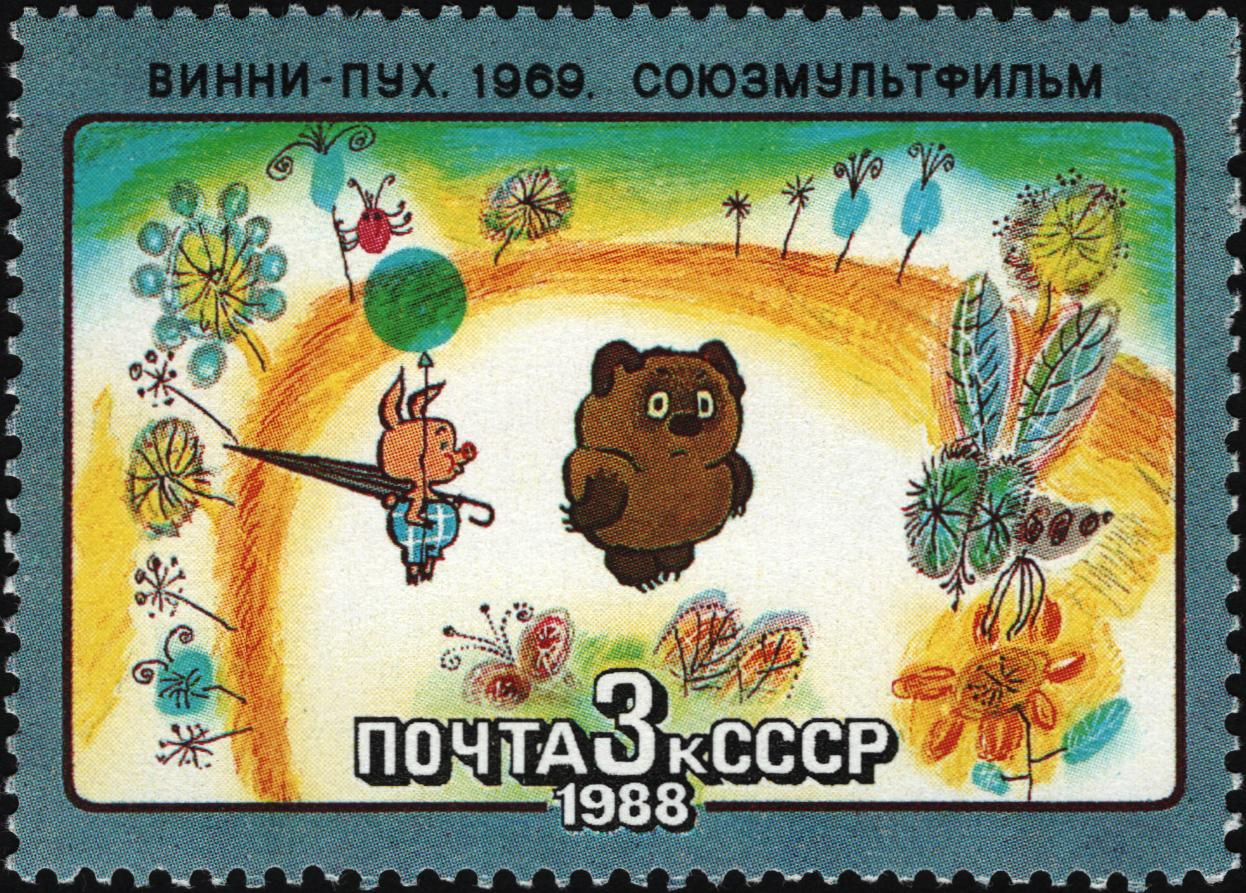
A postage stamp showing Piglet and Winnie-the-Pooh as they appear in the Soviet adaptation

In the Soviet Union, three Winnie-the-Pooh, (transcribed in Russian as Винни-Пух, Vinni Pukh) stories were made into a celebrated trilogy.

- 1969. Winnie-the-Pooh (Винни-Пух) – based on chapter 1
- 1971. Winnie-the-Pooh Pays a Visit (Винни-Пух идёт в гости) – based on chapter 2
- 1972. Winnie-the-Pooh and a Busy Day (Винни-Пух и день забот) – based on chapters 4 and 6.

The films used Boris Zakhoder's translation of the book. Pooh was voiced by Yevgeny Leonov. Unlike in the Disney adaptations, the animators did not base their depictions of the characters on Shepard's illustrations, instead creating a different look. The Soviet adaptations made extensive use of Milne's original text and often brought out aspects of Milne's characters' personalities not used in the Disney adaptations.

=== Television ===
- 1960: Shirley Temple's Storybook on NBC: Winnie-the-Pooh—a version for marionettes, designed, made, and operated by Bil and Cora Baird. Pooh was voiced by future Muppet performer Faz Fazakas.
- During the 1970s, the BBC children's television show Jackanory serialised the two books, which were read by Willie Rushton.
- 2026: Hundred Acre Wood's Winnie and Friends, a planned package of 208 seven-minute episodes and 5 holiday specials, to be released by Kartoon Studios beginning in December 2026. This 3D animated series has been advertised as having "a distinctive yarn-based animation style blending AI and hand-drawn characters and backgrounds".
- TBA: Untitled animated series.
- TBA: Christopher Robin (Working Title), R-rated live action/hybrid series featuring a middle age drugged Christopher Robin travelling back to the One Hundred Acre Wood.

=== Literature ===
- 2022: The Call of Poohthulhu, an anthology of Lovecraftian horror short stories set in the Winnie-the-Pooh universe.

=== Advertisement ===
- 2022: "Winnie-the-Screwed", an advertisement made by Ryan Reynolds for Mint Mobile.

=== Games ===
- TBA: Winnie's Hole, an upcoming indie rogue-lite body horror video game by Australian studio Twice Different.

== Cultural legacy ==
Maev Kennedy of The Guardian called Winnie-the-Pooh "the most famous bear in literary history". One of the best-known characters in British children's literature, a 2011 poll saw the bear voted onto the list of top 100 "icons of England". In 2003 the first Pooh book was ranked number 7 on the BBC's The Big Read poll. Forbes magazine ranked Pooh the most valuable fictional character in 2002, with merchandising products alone generating more than $5.9 billion that year. In 2005, Pooh generated $6 billion, a figure surpassed by only Mickey Mouse. In 2006, Pooh received a star on the Hollywood Walk of Fame, marking the 80th birthday of Milne's creation. In 2010, E. H. Shepard's original illustrations of Winnie the Pooh (and other Pooh characters) featured on a series of UK postage stamps issued by the Royal Mail.

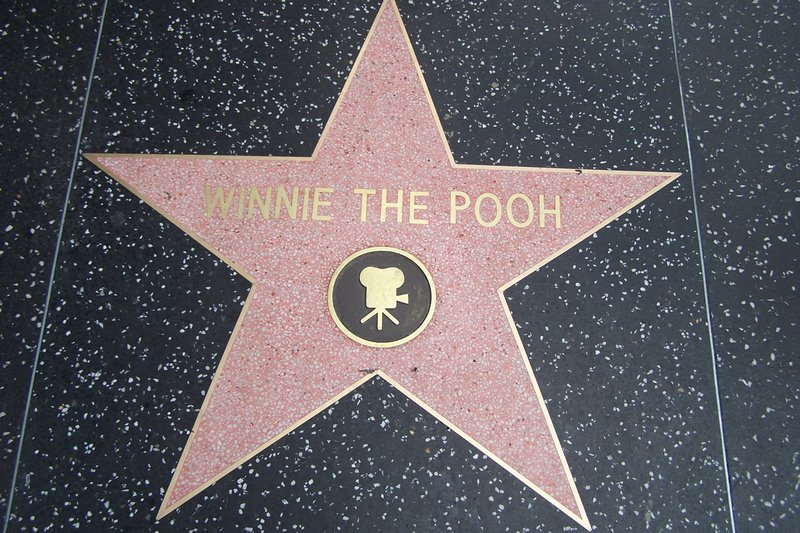
Winnie the Pooh's star on the Hollywood Walk of Fame

Winnie the Pooh has inspired multiple texts to explain complex philosophical ideas. Benjamin Hoff uses Milne's characters in The Tao of Pooh and The Te of Piglet to explain Taoism. Similarly, Frederick Crews wrote essays about the Pooh books in abstruse academic jargon in The Pooh Perplex and Postmodern Pooh to satirise a range of philosophical approaches. Pooh and the Philosophers by John T. Williams uses Winnie the Pooh as a backdrop to illustrate the works of philosophers, including Descartes, Kant, Plato and Nietzsche. "Epic Pooh" is a 1978 essay by Michael Moorcock that compares much fantasy writing to A. A. Milne's, as work intended to comfort, not challenge.

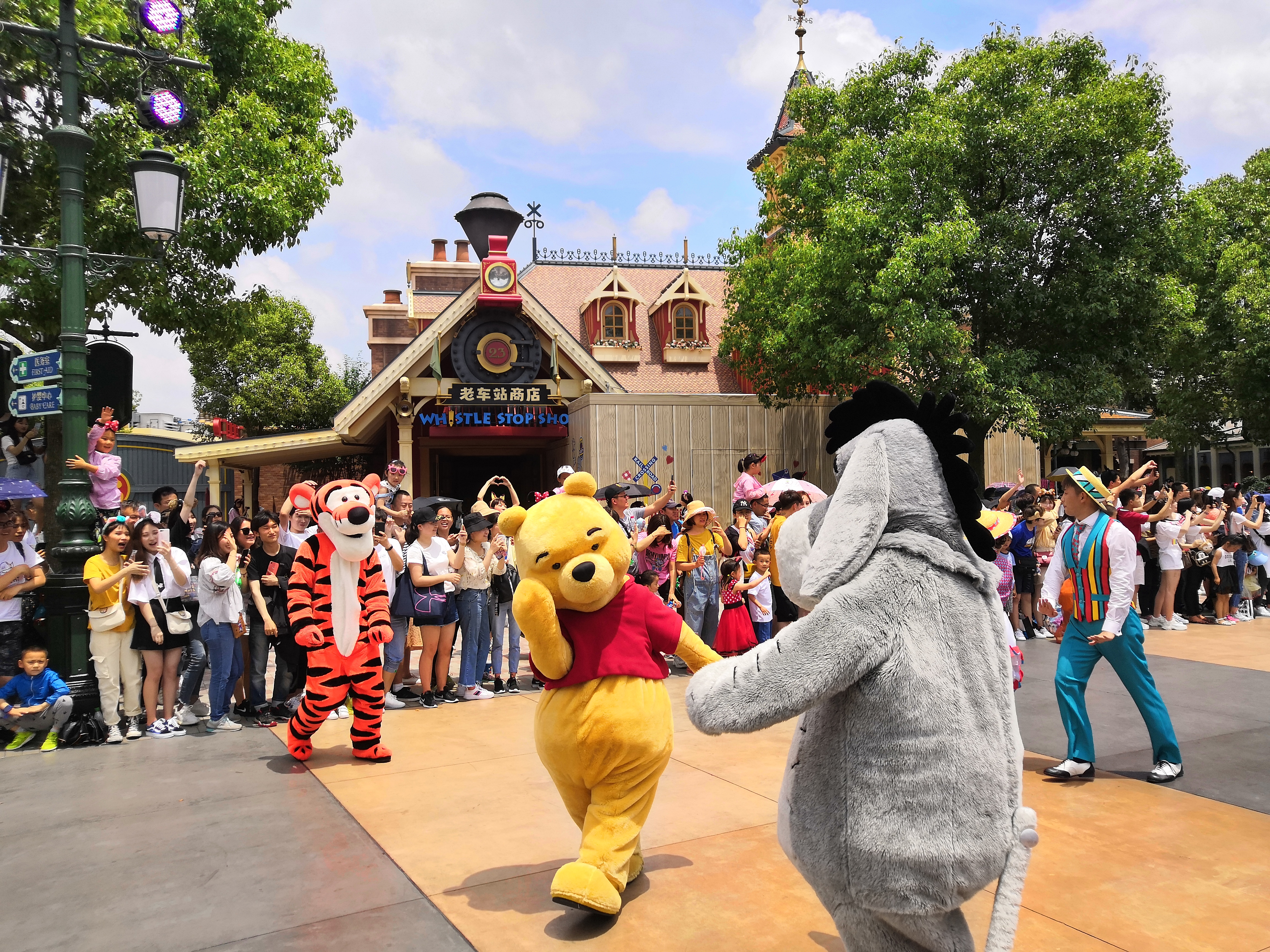
Pooh with Tigger and Eeyore at the Shanghai Disney Resort in 2019

In music, Kenny Loggins wrote the song "House at Pooh Corner", which was originally recorded by the Nitty Gritty Dirt Band. Loggins later rewrote the song as "Return to Pooh Corner", featuring on the album of the same name in 1991. In Italy, a pop band took their name from Winnie, and were titled Pooh. In Estonia, there is a punk/metal band called Winny Puhh. There is a street in Warsaw, Poland, named after the character, the Kubusia Puchatka Street, as he is known in Polish translations as Kubuś Puchatek. There is also a street named after him in Budapest, Hungary, the Micimackó Street.

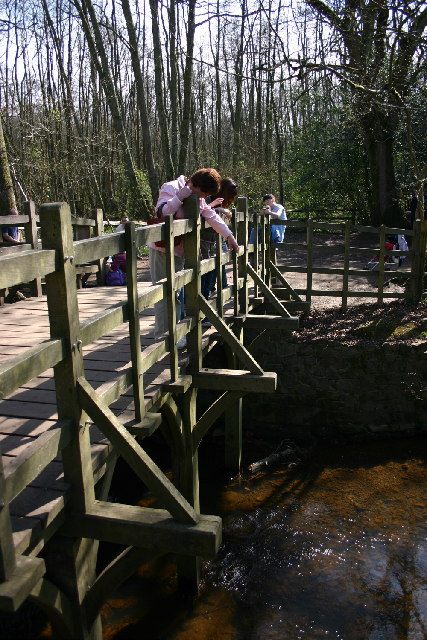
Poohsticks Bridge in Ashdown Forest where Pooh invented Poohsticks

In the "sport" of Poohsticks, competitors drop sticks into a stream from a bridge and then wait to see whose stick will cross the finish line first. Competitors hold their sticks at arms length at the same height, then drop their sticks into the water at the same time. Though it began as a game played by Pooh and his friends in the book The House at Pooh Corner and later in the films, it has crossed over into the real world: a World Championship Poohsticks race takes place in Oxfordshire each year. Ashdown Forest in south-east England, where the Pooh stories are set, is a popular tourist attraction, and includes the wooden Pooh Bridge where Pooh and Piglet invented Poohsticks. The Oxford University Winnie the Pooh Society was founded by undergraduates in 1982.

From December 2017 to April 2018, the Victoria and Albert Museum in London hosted the exhibition Winnie-the-Pooh: Exploring a Classic. On exhibit were A. A. Milne's manuscript of Winnie-the-Pooh and The House at Pooh Corner (on loan from the Wren Library at Trinity College, Cambridge, Milne's alma mater to which he had bequeathed the works), and teddy bears that had not been on display for 40 years because they were so fragile. The exhibit was then displayed in museums in the US, Japan, South Korea and Canada.

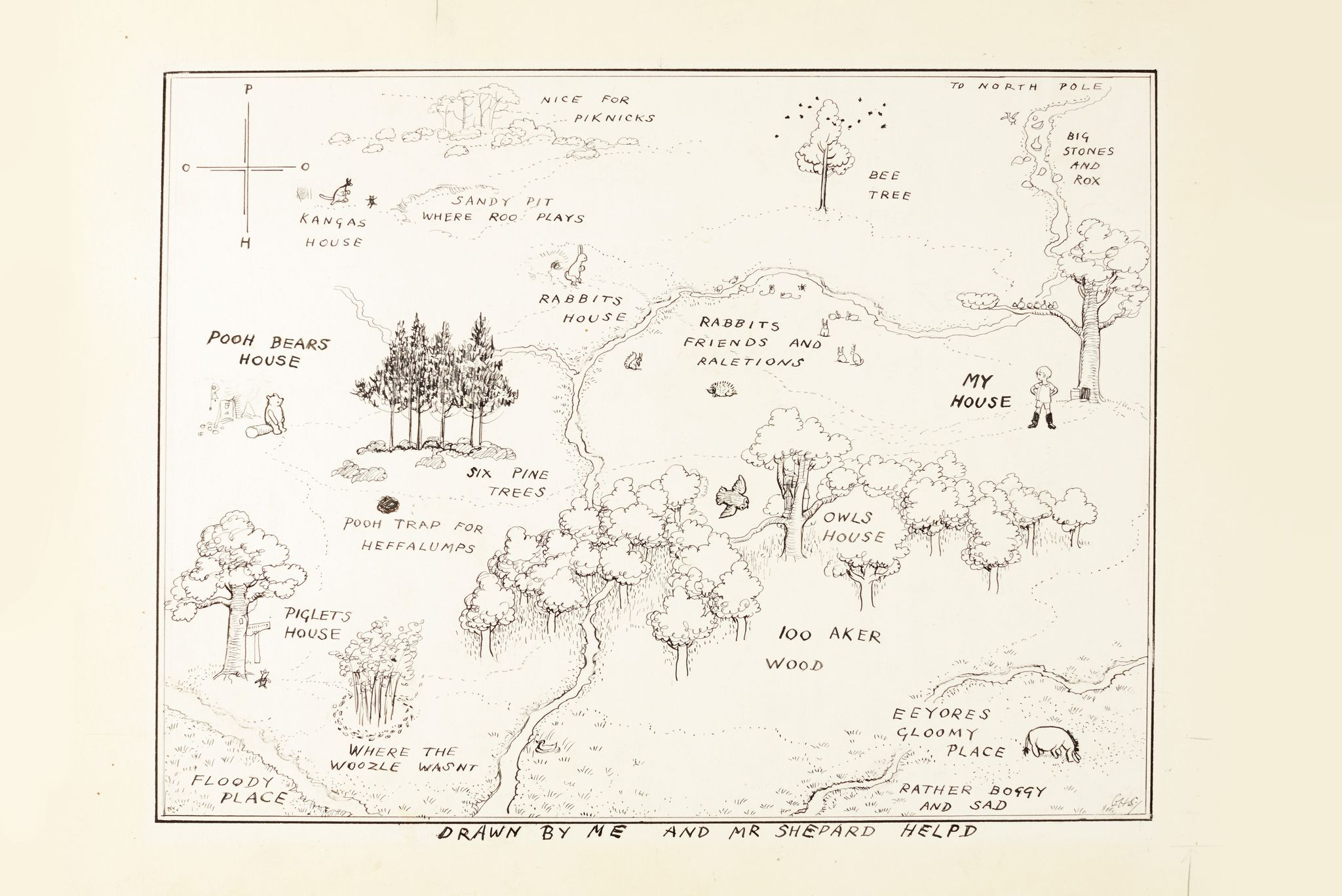
Shepard's 1926 illustrated map of the Hundred Acre Wood set a record price for book illustrations when it was sold at Sotheby's in London in 2018

In 2018, E. H. Shepard's original 1926 illustrated map of the Hundred Acre Wood, which features in the opening pages of Milne's books and also appears in the opening animation in the first Disney adaptation in 1966, sold for £430,000 ($600,000) at Sotheby's in London, setting a world record for book illustrations.

The Japanese figure skater and two-time Olympic champion Yuzuru Hanyu regards Pooh as his lucky charm. He is usually seen with a stuffed Winnie-the-Pooh during his figure skating competitions. Because of this, Hanyu's fans will throw stuffed Winnie-the-Poohs onto the ice after his performance. After one of Hanyu's performances at the 2018 Winter Olympics in Pyeongchang, one spectator remarked that "the ice turned yellow" because of all the Poohs thrown onto the ice. In 2026, Disney Japan officially collaborated with Hanyu for the first time to commemorate Winnie the Pooh's 100th anniversary, drawing on Hanyu's long-standing bond with Pooh.

=== Comparison to Xi Jinping ===
Meme comparing Eeyore and Winnie the Pooh to former Japanese Prime Minister Shinzo Abe and Xi Jinping respectively

In China, images of Pooh were censored from social media websites in mid-2017, when Internet memes comparing Chinese Paramount Leader and General Secretary of the Communist Party Xi Jinping to (Disney's version of) Pooh became popular. The 2018 film Christopher Robin was also denied a Chinese release. Although many in the United States attributed the omission of Christopher Robin from Chinese cinemas to censorship, Chinese authorities provided no official explanation. Some analysts argued the decision may have been unrelated to political concerns, citing China’s annual quota of 34 foreign films. Additionally, the 2011 theatrical release Winnie the Pooh also did not screen in China – predating both the controversy and Xi Jinping’s general secretaryship.

When Xi visited the Philippines, protestors posted images of Pooh on social media. Other politicians have been compared to Winnie-the-Pooh characters alongside Xi, including Barack Obama as Tigger, Carrie Lam, Rodrigo Duterte, and Peng Liyuan as Piglet, and Fernando Chui and Shinzo Abe as Eeyore.

Pooh's Chinese name (Chinese: 小熊维尼; lit. 'little bear Winnie') has been censored from video games such as World of Warcraft, PlayerUnknown's Battlegrounds, Arena of Valor, and Devotion. Images of Pooh in Kingdom Hearts III were also blurred out on the gaming site A9VG.

Despite the ban, two Pooh-themed rides still operate in Disneyland Shanghai, and it is also legal to purchase Pooh-bear merchandise and books about Winnie the Pooh in China. In May 2021, a performer dressed up as Winnie-the-Pooh in Shanghai Disneyland was beaten by a child tourist. Mass media in China used the term "Pooh Pooh Bear" (Chinese: 噗噗熊) in reports about this incident because the word "Winnie" has been censored. However, search results of "Pooh Pooh Bear hurt in Shanghai Disneyland" were censored on Weibo after this incident happened.

In October 2019, Pooh was featured in the South Park episode "Band in China" as a prisoner in China because of his alleged resemblance with Xi. In the episode, Pooh is brutally killed by Randy Marsh. South Park was banned in China as a result of the episode.

Taiwanese pilots have worn morale patches which feature a Formosan black bear punching Winnie-the-Pooh in the face. The patches are produced by a private company and demand for them surged greatly after pictures of active duty personnel wearing them began circulating.

=== 100th anniversary ===
To celebrate the 100th anniversary of Winnie the Pooh, Disney Japan is hosting a new project, with Sho Sakurai, Snow Man's Ryohei Abe, and Travis Japan's Noel Kawashima chosen as ambassadors. "Pooh Time" was launched as an initiative to provide everyone who works hard in their busy daily lives a gentle moment to "do nothing". The project started on 14 October 2026, Pooh's "birthday".

In addition, two further projects commemorating the 100th anniversary were created in collaboration with two-time Olympic champion Yuzuru Hanyu. The first, titled "Shower of Heart", draws on the bond between Winnie the Pooh and Hanyu and features more than 100 specially produced items, including a plush toy depicting Hanyu himself sold as a set with a Winnie the Pooh plush toy. It is scheduled to begin with an exhibition in Tokyo in October 2026, followed by a tour of four other cities, before concluding in Sendai in May 2027. The second, titled "To Pooh: Yuzuru Hanyu and Winnie the Pooh Memory Book with Dress-Up Pooh Plush Toy", consists of a book documenting the bond between Hanyu and Winnie the Pooh, accompanied by a plush toy that can be dressed in two costumes based on those worn by Hanyu when he won his second Olympic gold medal.

In October 2026, BBC Radio 4 celebrated the centenary of Winnie-the-Pooh with a special week of programmes introduced by Queen Camilla. The celebrations featured five newly recorded readings of classic tales, alongside a new drama inspired by the campaign to save the real-life Hundred Acre Wood. On 14 October 2026, Google celebrated the 100th anniversary of the first publication with an exclusive Doodle in the United Kingdom.

== See also ==
- Edward Bear, Canadian pop-rock band named after Winnie-the-Pooh
- List of Winnie-the-Pooh books
- List of Winnie-the-Pooh characters
- Woozle effect
