= Winnie's Hole =

Upcoming horror video game

- Art and logo
- Developer: Twice Different
- Publisher: Twice Different
- Platform: Windows
- Release: January 26, 2026 (early access)
- Genres: Horror; Roguelike

Winnie's Hole is an indie roguelike body horror video game based on Winnie-the-Pooh. It was developed by the Australian studio Twice Different as a Steam exclusive. It was released into early access on January 26, 2026.

== Gameplay and plot ==
Winnie's Hole is a roguelike game in which the player controls a virus infecting Winnie-the-Pooh, maneuvering throughout his body while collecting resources and capturing healthy cells, transforming him into a monstrous entity. Now he begins to infect the rest of his friends while the disease grows more grotesque.

== Reception ==
=== Pre-release reaction ===
The game received initially mixed reactions upon announcement, with comparisons to the 2023 film Winnie-the-Pooh: Blood and Honey, which had a similar horror take on the character. Ashley Bardhan of Kotaku responded positively to the game's announcement, stating that, "I am genuinely looking forward to playing this". Ed Nightingale of Eurogamer, on the other hand, called the game, "the most absurd idea for a video game I've ever seen", although admitted an interest in playing it. In more neutral coverage, Arthur Damian of The Escapist expressed a desire to see a more "wholesome" take on the character after the game's release. Similarly, there was criticism over the game's decision to continue the recent horror trend of the Winnie-the-Pooh franchise, with Zoey Handley from Destructoid considering the genre to be played out and overused.

=== Demo ===
A demo for the game released in May 2025. Writing for Vice, Shaun Cichacki said that the game was "shaping up to be a rather interesting time", and that the studio Twice Different had the potential to make Winnie's Hole into an actually well-regarded game rather than a gimmick. Nic Reuben similarly said that Twice Different had made good games before.
