= Winnie-the-Pooh Meets the Queen =

2016 children's book written by Jane Riordan and illustrated by Mark Burgess

- Author: Jane Riordan
- Illustrator: Mark Burgess
- Language: English
- Genre: Children
- Publisher: Egmont Publishing (print); Disney (e-book)
- Publication date: 3 November 2016
- Publication place: United Kingdom
- Media type: Print
- Pages: 64
- ISBN: 9781405286817

Winnie-the-Pooh Meets the Queen (e-book edition published as Winnie-the-Pooh and the Royal Birthday) is a children's book written to celebrate the 90th birthdays of both the fictional character Winnie-the-Pooh and Queen Elizabeth II in 2016. The Queen celebrated her 90th Official Birthday on 11 June, although her actual birthday was on 21 April. The first Winnie-the-Pooh book, written by A. A. Milne, was published in October 1926. This original story imagines a meeting between Pooh and Queen Elizabeth at Buckingham Palace. The text was written by Jane Riordan while illustrations were by Mark Burgess in the style of the original drawings by E. H. Shepard.

== Background ==
The story was originally available as an audio-video download narrated by the actor Jim Broadbent. Broadbent said "I have been a fan of Winnie-the-Pooh since I was a boy. In fact I named my very first and much loved teddy Pooh and that can only have been after the A. A. Milne character". The print version followed in November 2016. A. A. Milne dedicated a 1926 book of songs featuring Pooh, "Teddy Bear and Other Songs", to the newborn then-Princess Elizabeth. As a little girl, Princess Elizabeth was also presented with a hand-painted Christopher Robin tea set. A PDF e-book version was also released by Disney. In this edition, Jane Riordan is not credited as author. Prince George of Cambridge has an appearance in the story when Piglet presents him with a red balloon. George is not named, just nicknamed "Little Boy", but is described as "much younger than Christopher Robin and almost as bouncy as Tigger".

== Plot ==
Christopher Robin informs Winnie-the-Pooh, Piglet, Eeyore, Rabbit, Tigger, and Kanga that Queen Elizabeth II is about to celebrate her 90th birthday. The toys discuss the need for a very special present to mark the occasion. Pooh comes up with a hum that everyone agrees would make a charming gift. Christopher Robin, Pooh, Piglet, and Eeyore travel up to London on a train from East Grinstead to deliver the hum in person. They take a bus from Victoria station and enjoy such iconic London sights as Piccadilly and Trafalgar Square. The Queen happens to be out for a stroll in front of Buckingham Palace, allowing Pooh the opportunity to deliver the hum in person. After Piglet gives a balloon to the Queen's great-grandson, Prince George, Pooh and the gang then return home to the Hundred Acre Wood.
