= Kate Saunders =

English author, actress and journalist (1960–2023)

- Born: Katharine Mary Saunders; 4 May 1960; London, England
- Died: 21 April 2023 (aged 62); London, England
- Occupations: Writer; actress
- Spouse: Philip Wells (m. 1985, divorced)
- Children: 1
- Writing career
- Years active: 1975–2023
- Notable work: Five Children on the Western Front

Katharine Mary Saunders (4 May 1960 – 21 April 2023) was an English writer, actress and journalist. She won the Betty Trask Award and the Costa Children's Book Award and was twice shortlisted for the Carnegie Medal.

== Early life and education ==
Katharine Mary Saunders was born on 4 May 1960 to an Anglo Catholic family in London, the eldest of six children. Her father was public relations advocate Basil Saunders, and her mother was journalist Betty (née Smith) Saunders. She was educated at the Camden School for Girls.

== Career ==
=== Television ===
Saunders worked as an actress through her twenties. Her work included an appearance as a policewoman dated by Rodney Trotter in an Only Fools and Horses episode in 1982. She also played Caroline, a friend of Penny's in a Christmas Special episode of Just Good Friends in 1984 and was a regular contributor to radio and television, with appearances on the Radio 4 programmes Woman's Hour, Start the Week and Kaleidoscope. She was, with Sandi Toksvig, a guest on the first episode of the long-running news quiz programme Have I Got News for You. The BBC children's series Belfry Witches was based on her series of children's books about two mischief-making witches.

=== Writing ===
Saunders wrote for newspapers and magazines in the UK, including The Sunday Times, Sunday Express, Daily Telegraph, She and Cosmopolitan. She wrote many novels, such as Wild Young Bohemians, and also co-wrote Catholics and Sex (1992) with Peter Stanford, who was then editor of the Catholic Herald. Saunders and Stanford later presented a television series based on the book on Channel 4.

Saunders won the annual Costa Children's Book Award for Five Children on the Western Front (2014), a contribution to the classic fantasy series that E. Nesbit inaugurated in 1902 with Five Children and It. She was also a contributor to the authorised Winnie-the-Pooh sequel, The Best Bear in All the World. Her children's novel The Land of Neverendings has been shortlisted for the 2019 Carnegie Medal, as was Five Children on the Western Front in 2016.

== Personal life and death ==
Saunders married Philip Wells in 1985; they had a son and later divorced. Their son died by suicide when he was 19 years old.

Saunders had multiple sclerosis. Her health declined in the years after her son's death, but she continued to write until the end of her life. She died from cancer at her home in Archway, London, on 21 April 2023, at the age of 62.

== Selected books ==
=== Novels ===
- The Prodigal Father (1986) - Won The Betty Trask Award in 1986
- Storm in the Citadel (1989)
- Night Shall Overtake Us (1993)
- Wild Young Bohemians (1995)
- Lily-Josephine (1998)
- The Marrying Game (2002)
- Bachelor Boys (2004)
- Crooked Castle (2013)
- Mariana (2013)

==== The Laetitia Rodd Mysteries ====
- The Secrets of Wishtide (2016)
- The Case of the Wandering Scholar (2019)
- The Mystery of the Sorrowful Maiden (2021)

=== Children's books ===
- A Spell of Witches (1999)
- The Belfry Witches (omnibus) (2003)
- Cat and the Stinkwater War (2003)
- The Little Secret (2006)
- Beswitched (2010)
- Magicalamity (2011)
- The Whizz Pop Chocolate Shop (2012)
- The Curse of The Chocolate Phoenix (2013)
- Five Children on the Western Front (2014)
- The Land of Neverendings (2017)
- A Drop Of Golden Sun (2024)

== Filmography ==
=== Film ===
Year	Title	Role	Notes
1979	Birth of the Beatles	Girl Fan	

=== Television ===
Year	Title	Role	Notes
1975	You Must Be Joking!	Unknown	2 episodes
1976	A Place to Hide	Receptionist	Episode: "The Contact"
1978	Angels	Brenda Cotteral	12 episodes
1979	Playhouse	Jenny	Episode: "The Daughters of Albion"
1979	A Family Affair	Donna	3 episodes
1982	Only Fools and Horses	Sandra	Episode: "The Long Legs of the Law"
1984	Just Good Friends	Caroline	Episode:Christmas Special
