= Winnie-the-Pooh: The Best Bear in All the World =

2016 sequel to Winnie-the-Pooh by A. A. Milne

- Author: Paul Bright; Jeanne Willis; Kate Saunders; Brian Sibley
- Illustrator: Mark Burgess
- Language: English
- Genre: Children's literature, anthology
- Publisher: Egmont Books
- Publication date: 6 October 2016
- Publication place: United Kingdom
- Pages: 128
- ISBN: 978-1405286619
- Preceded by: Return to the Hundred Acre Wood (2009)

Winnie-the-Pooh: The Best Bear in All the World is the second authorised sequel to A. A. Milne's original Winnie-the-Pooh stories. It was published on 6 October 2016 to mark the 90th anniversary of the publication of the first Winnie-the-Pooh book. The sequel is an anthology of four short stories, each written by a leading children's author: Paul Bright, Jeanne Willis, Kate Saunders, and Brian Sibley. The illustrations, executed in the style of the originals by E. H. Shepard, are by Mark Burgess.

The book attracted national press coverage due to the introduction of a new character, Penguin.

== Plot ==
The book is divided into four stories, each devoted to one of the seasons in the Hundred Acre Wood:

- "Autumn" (by Paul Bright): Christopher Robin is excited to be appearing as Saint George in the village play, but he alarms Winnie-the-Pooh and Piglet with talk of a dragon. Meanwhile, Eeyore is possessively guarding "Something Interesting", but is it something AD or something BC? With so many questions to ask, the friends are unsure what to do since Christopher Robin has asked not to be disturbed.
- "Winter" (by Brian Sibley): Introduces a new character, Penguin. Christopher Robin says Penguin needs "Bringing Out of Himself". The animals wonder if Penguin will stay long enough for them to truly get to know him.
- "Spring" (by Jeanne Willis): The birds are nesting and Pooh is admiring the daffodils and humming to himself when he encounters Eeyore, who is feeling gloomy because he is convinced that another donkey is after his thistles. Pooh sets out to find this other donkey, and Piglet agrees to help as long as the other donkey is not a Heffalump.
- "Summer" (by Kate Saunders): Christopher Robin tells Winnie-the-Pooh all about the "Sauce of the Nile", which makes Pooh wonder if the river in the Hundred Acre Wood also has its own sauce. He sets off with Piglet, Rabbit, Tigger, and the others on an expotition to find out.

== Background and new character ==
Shortly before publication, it was announced that The Best Bear in All the World would officially introduce a new character to the Hundred Acre Wood in the form of Penguin. Author Brian Sibley was inspired to create the character by a photograph of A. A. Milne's son, Christopher Robin Milne (the real Christopher Robin), playing with a toy penguin.

Sibley stated that the challenge was more than just attempting to play "A. A. Milne in his own literary game", but also to successfully introduce a brand new character while remaining sympathetic to the tone and style of the original books. He reasoned that the thought of Pooh encountering a penguin seemed "no more outlandish than his meeting a kangaroo and a tiger in a Sussex wood". Penguin is the first new character to be authorised by the Milne estate.

The original penguin toy belonging to Christopher Robin is thought to have been bought at Harrods. According to Harrods archivist Sebastian Wormell, the toy department where Mrs. Milne bought the iconic original bear hosted a huge array of stuffed animals. "In the early years of the 20th century, toy penguins soared in popularity as the exploits of Antarctic explorers such as Shackleton and Scott fascinated the public," Wormell explained. Experts believe the toy pictured in the photograph could be "Squeak", a toy that originated in the 1922 Harrods catalogue based on the popular cartoon strip Pip, Squeak and Wilfred.

== Other sequels ==
This is the second authorised sequel to Milne's original stories. The first, Return to the Hundred Acre Wood (2009), was written by David Benedictus and also illustrated by Mark Burgess. It similarly introduced a new character, Lottie the Otter.

Another special adventure was conceived for Pooh's 90th birthday, Winnie-the-Pooh Meets the Queen, in which Pooh visits Buckingham Palace for the occasion of Queen Elizabeth II's 90th birthday.
