= Winnie ille Pu =

1958 translation of Winnie-the-Pooh into Latin

- Author: Alexander Lenard
- Language: Latin
- Published: 1958
- Publisher: Methuen Publishing

Winnie ille Pu is a 1958 translation of A. A. Milne's 1926 children's book Winnie-the-Pooh into Latin by Alexander Lenard. The book was an unexpected hit, becoming the first foreign-language book to make The New York Times Best Seller list. Its success inspired the translation of a number of other children's books into Latin.

== Writing and publication ==
Lenard was teaching at a mining community in Brazil when he began translating Winnie-the-Pooh. He was motivated by his previous experience, teaching English to a boy in Rome by using the original Winnie-the-Pooh as an aid. Lenard was fired from his teaching job while still working on the translation, and he continued working from São Paulo. Publishers were skeptical of the book's potential and Lenard self-published the first printing in 1958.

The initial publication was successful and spurred interest from beyond Brazil. The first publishing house to print the book was Bokförlaget Forum in Sweden; it was then picked up by Methuen Publishing in the UK and then E. P. Dutton in the US. When it was first published in the US, it received considerable praise from the press; The Christian Science Monitor went so far as to credit it with "saving Latin". This positive attention caused bookstores to quickly sell out of their copies, as at first Dutton had only imported 1500 copies; the resulting shortage only increased interest in the book. Overall, the book sold 125,000 copies in the US and spent 20 weeks on The New York Times Best Seller list, becoming the first non-English book to do so. The book was particularly desirable as a coffee-table status symbol.

== Scholarly reception ==
Classicist opinions on the book were broadly positive. K. Vadum Fractum and Kenneth Reckford called the book "superb entertainment" and noted correspondences between themes in Winnie-the-Pooh and Roman poetry. Michiel Verweij, in a 2008 retrospective, argued that Lenard had carved out a niche by not copying the writing style of Cicero, as other Latinists had.

However, some classicists were more critical. Even before publication, one scholar questioned the utility of the book as a teaching aid, saying "at the time when pupils would be expected to understand your Latin properly they would already have reached the age when the subject matter would be of no interest to them". This line of criticism continued after publication, with C. J. Fordyce remarking that the translation was not sufficiently fun to justify itself. Additionally, even some favorable reviewers, such as Harry C. Schnur, criticized the quality of some of Lenard's Latin.

== Impact ==
The success of Winnie ille Pu spurred further interest in Latin translations of children's books. Five years after its publication, The Tale of Peter Rabbit, The Little Prince, and Alice's Adventures in Wonderland were all translated into Latin. However, after this brief renaissance, the enthusiasm for translation into Latin slowly declined.

== See also ==
- List of Latin translations of modern literature
