= Return to the Hundred Acre Wood =

Book by David Benedictus

- First edition, Dutton Press
- Author: David Benedictus
- Illustrator: Mark Burgess
- Language: English
- Series: Winnie-the-Pooh
- Genre: Children's books
- Publisher: Egmont Books (UK); Dutton (USA)
- Publication place: United Kingdom; United States
- English publication date: 5 October 2009
- Pages: 216 pages
- ISBN: 978-0-525-42160-3
- Preceded by: The House at Pooh Corner
- Followed by: The Best Bear in All the World

Return to the Hundred Acre Wood is a Winnie-the-Pooh novel published on 5 October 2009. Written by David Benedictus and illustrated by Mark Burgess, it was the first such book since 1928 and introduced the character Lottie the Otter.

In the mid-1990s, after completing an audio adaptation of A. A. Milne's Winnie-the-Pooh stories, Benedictus wrote two Pooh short stories of his own and submitted them to the trustees of the Milne estate. The trustees replied that they were unable to publish the stories because "Walt Disney owned all the rights." However, ten years later, Benedictus was contacted by the trustees, who explained that "the sequel rights had reverted to them" and asked Benedictus to make changes to one of the short stories and to submit some more. This collection of stories was published as Return to the Hundred Acre Wood.

== Chapters ==
1. In Which Christopher Robin Returns
2. In Which Owl Does a Crossword and a Spelling Bee Is Held
3. In Which Rabbit Organizes Almost Everything
4. In Which It Stops Raining for Ever and Something Slinky Comes Out of the River
5. In Which Pooh Goes in Search of Honey
6. In Which Owl Becomes an Author and Then Unbecomes One
7. In Which Lottie Starts an Academy and Everybody Learns Something
8. In Which We Are Introduced to the Game of Cricket
9. In Which Tigger Dreams of Africa
10. In Which a Harvest Festival Is Held in the Forest and Christopher Robin Springs a Surprise

== Lottie the Otter ==
Lottie is a new character in Return to the Hundred Acre Wood.

Lottie is said to be a "feisty" character who is also said to be good at cricket and insists on proper etiquette. According to Benedictus, "Lottie the Otter truly embodies Winnie-the-Pooh's values of friendship and adventure seen throughout Milne's work, thus making the perfect companion for everyone's favourite bear."
