= Paul Bright (author) =

English writer (born 1949)

- Born: 19 March 1949 (age 77); Welwyn Garden City, England
- Education: Reading University; Loughborough University (MSc); Cranfield Institute of Technology (PhD)
- Occupation: Writer
- Writing career
- Years active: 1997–2016
- Genres: Children's books; Poetry

Paul Francis Bright (born 19 March 1949) is an English writer, mainly of picture books and poetry for children. His stories have featured on BBC CBeebies and CITV's Bookaboo programmes. Bright has also written stories for CBeebies radio, and for the BBC Jam and BBC RaW web sites, as well as poems for school reading schemes. His picture book Quiet!, illustrated by Guy Parker-Rees, was shortlisted for the Blue Peter Book Award (2004) and I’m Not Going Out There!, illustrated by Ben Cort won the Stockport Schools’ Book Award (2007). Crunch Munch Dinosaur Lunch, illustrated by Michael Terry, was shortlisted for the Red House Book Award (2010). His most recent picture book, The Hole Story, with illustrations by Bruce Ingman, was shortlisted for the 2017 English 4-11 Picture Book Award, given by the English Association. Bright is one of four authors selected to write new Winnie-the-Pooh stories for ‘The Best Bear in all the World’, an official sequel to the classic stories by A. A. Milne, published in October 2016 to celebrate 90 years since the publication of Winnie-the-Pooh. Bright has appeared at the Edinburgh International Book Festival and the Wigtown Book Festival. His name consistently features in the lists of the top 500 most borrowed authors from UK public libraries.

== Biography ==
Bright was born in Welwyn Garden City, Hertfordshire on 19 March 1949, and attended WGC High School. He studied Engineering Science at Reading University and subsequently obtained an MSc in Polymer Technology from Loughborough University and PhD from Cranfield Institute of Technology. He worked for 35 years in the plastics and chemicals industries, in the UK, Switzerland, The Netherlands and Spain. Writing was a hobby for many years. Bright developed his skills by attending a number of residential writing courses run by The Arvon Foundation. His first short story for children appeared in a compilation ‘Time Watch’ published by Orion Children's Books in 1997. In the following years he had many children's poems in compilations published by Macmillan, Hodder, Oxford University Press and others. Bright's first picture book, Under the Bed, illustrated by Ben Cort, was published in 2003 by Little Tiger Press. He is represented by the Curtis Brown agency.

Bright is married, with two children, and lives in Kent.

== Bibliography ==
The Gingerbread Channel, in Time Watch	(Orion Children's Books, 1997)
Under the Bed	(Little Tiger Press, 2003)
Quiet!	(Little Tiger Press, 2003)
Nobody Laughs at a Lion	(Little Tiger Press, 2005)
I'm Not Going Out There!	(Little Tiger Press, 2006)
The Bears in the Bed and the Great Big Storm	(Little Tiger Press, 2008)
Fidgety Fish and Friends	(Little Tiger Press, 2008)
Grumpy Badger's Christmas	(Little Tiger Press, 2009)
Charlie's Superhero Underpants	(Little Tiger Press, 2009)
Crunch Munch Dinosaur Lunch!	(Little Tiger Press, 2009)
What's More Scary Than a Shark?	(Little Tiger Press, 2010)
Fuzzy-Wuzzy Bugs	(Little Tiger Press, 2010)
Boris's Big Bogey	(Little Tiger Press, 2011)
The Not-So Scary Snorklum	(Little Tiger Press, 2011)
Muddypaws’ First Christmas	(Parragon Books, 2012)
If You Meet a Dinosaur	(Little Tiger Press, 2013)
Sam's Super Stinky Socks	(Simon and Schuster, 2014)
The Hole Story	(Andersen Press, 2016)
There's a Bison Bouncing on the Bed	(Little Tiger Press, 2016)
The Best Bear in All the World	(co-writer)(Egmont Publishing, 2016)
