= Mark Burgess (children's author) =

British artist

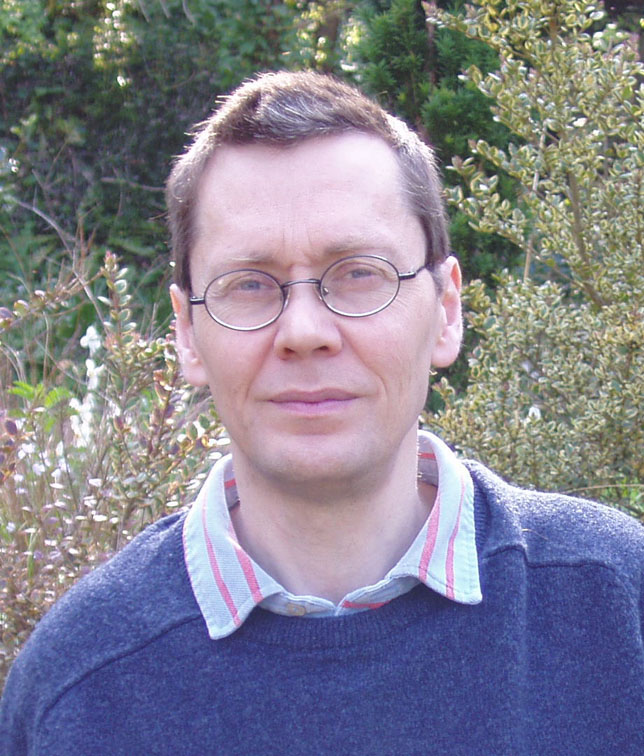
- Mark Burgess in 2009
- Born: Mark Simon Burgess; 26 April 1957 (age 69); Chislehurst, London, England
- Education: Christ's Hospital; Slade School of Fine Art, B.A.
- Occupations: Artist, Writer, Computer Programmer
- Spouse: Rosemary J. Benson.
- Writing career
- Pen name: Simon Goswell (two books only)
- Genre: children's literature
- Website: www.markburgess.co.uk

Mark Burgess (born 26 April 1957; pen name Simon Goswell for two books) is best known as an English author and illustrator of children's literature. He has illustrated books by Tony Bradman and Martin Waddell. Among his most recent assignments, he illustrated Return to the Hundred Acre Wood, the authorized sequel of Winnie-the-Pooh.

Burgess also designs greeting cards and is a computer programmer. Additionally, Burgess has colored and adapted the newer editions of various classic children's books that were drawn by the late E. H. Shepard and Peggy Fortnum.

== Life ==
Mark Simon Burgess was born in Chislehurst on 26 April 1957 to John Frederick Orchard Burgess and Mona Goswell. He was the third child among his four siblings. He attended boarding school at Christ's Hospital in Sussex, England from 1968 to 1974 in the Middleton B house.

In 1975, Burgess began studying at the Slade School of Fine Art of the University College London. Graduating from there with a B.A. in Fine Art in 1979, he began working as a freelance author and illustrator of children's books, magazines and greetings cards (of which he has designed over 500). He also briefly worked at the London Zoo as well as in a library in Cambridge.

The first book Burgess illustrated is Martin Waddell's Harriet and the Crocodiles, published in 1983.

He currently lives in Taunton, Somerset and is married to Malawi-born artist Rosemary Benson, who is his senior by 9 years and who also attended the Slade School of Art from 1977 to 1979.

== Style ==
While Burgess has written and illustrated various books in his own style, his ability to reproduce the style of other (deceased) artists has been noted on more than one occasion. For example, the book Dogs' Night, by Meredith Hooper, begun with Allan Curless as the illustrator. However, since Curless died before its completion, Burgess finished the job such "that most readers would be hard-pressed to identify which artist did which pictures", according to Lauren P. Gattilia for Education World.

Burgess also illustrated Return to the Hundred Acre Wood in the style of E. H. Shepard, whose work he admired. When speaking of his work on that book, Burgess said:

"I approached this project with great trepidation. In my worst moments I wonder if Shepard would absolutely hate what I'm doing. That would be dreadful, I absolutely revere him."

== Reception ==
=== As a writer ===
Chloe Spooner from The Bookbag praised Burgess' Where Teddy Bears Come From (illustrated by Russell Ayto) writing, "The author Mark Burgess has created a wonderful world for children here in this book, and the extra dash of Christmas magic just makes an already lovely story all the more charming."

=== As an illustrator ===
Burgess shared a 2002 Blue Hen Book Award in the Picture Book Winner category for his and Allan Curless' illustrations in Dogs' Night.

Burgess' illustration of Return to the Hundred Acre Wood in particular received good reviews in The Sunday Times as well as in Fantasy Book Review and Kidsreads.com. In The Times, Ann Thwaite wrote, "With the new book, Burgess seems indispensable." Jana Siciliano of Kidsreads.com, wrote:

"...illustrator Mark Burgess has studied the pen-and-ink-and-watercolor elegance of Ernest H. Shepard's original illustrations and created a beautiful book filled with iconic images rendered in such exacting fashion that one, for a moment, questions whether or not they are lost Shepard masterpieces (a two-page spread with all the characters playing cricket towards the end is worthy of framing). It's one thing for someone to copy the language of a simple and elegant story, but it is something else entirely to do the same for famous illustrative accompaniment."

However, Susan Perren, children's book columnist of The Globe and Mail, had reservations on the drawings found in Return to the Hundred Acre Wood. Perren wrote, "This bad-tempered donkey might say, too, that Mark Burgess, as good an illustrator as he might be, is no Ernest Shepherd, and anyway, where are all those lovely line drawings we enjoyed so much in the original?"

Burgess also illustrated the 2016 authorized sequel to Winnie-the-Pooh, The Best Bear in All the World and the 90th anniversary special Winnie-the-Pooh Meets the Queen.

== Bibliography ==
As of 2010, he has written and illustrated over 30 of his own books, and has illustrated an additional 36 books by other authors.

Author and illustrator:

1. What Thomas Did (1986)
2. Is it a Tiger? (1987)
3. Monkey Business (1987)
4. Lucky Thunder (1989)
5. Feeling Beastly (1989)
6. The Cat's Pyjamas (1990; United States title: The Cat's Pajamas)
7. Can't Get To Sleep (1990)
8. The Phantom Phunbook (1991)
9. The Birthday Joke Book (1991)
10. One Little Teddy Bear (1991 )
11. Zoe and the Space Pirates (1991)
12. The Spangly Dragon and other funny poems (1992)
13. Feeling Peckish (poetry collection) (1992)
14. Ho, Ho, Ho! - Bumper Christmas Issue (1993)
15. C.A.T. Crusoe (1993)
16. Mutiny at Crossbones Bay (1994)
17. Night, Night (1994)
18. Hello, Day (1994)
19. Hannah's Hotel: Rainy Weather (1994)
20. Hannah's Hotel: The Late Arrivals (1994)
21. Hannah's Hotel: Many Happy Returns (1994)
22. Hannah's Hotel: Beside The Sea (1994)
23. Teddy and Rabbit's Picnic Outing (1995)
24. Teddy and Rabbit's Muddy Bicycle (1995)
25. Teddy and Rabbit's Runaway Washing (1995)
26. Teddy and Rabbit's Birthday Surprise (1995)
27. Teddy and Rabbit's Shop (1996)
28. Teddy Bears' Picnic (1997)
29. Teddy Time (2000)
30. Little Duck on the Moon (2002)

Author only:

1. Agent Spike & the Vegetables of Doom (2003; U.S. title: When Vegetables Attack)
2. Theo Slugg in Low Spirits (2004; under pen name Simon Goswell)
3. Theo Slugg in Dead Trouble (2004; under pen name Simon Goswell)
4. Where Teddy Bears Come From (2008)

Illustrator only:

1. Harriet and the Crocodiles (1983)
2. Harriet and the Haunted School (1984)
3. The Elephant Joke Book. (1985)
4. Mary had a Crocodile (1985)
5. A Very Mouse Joke Book (1986)
6. Harriet and the Robot (1986)
7. The Holiday Joke Book (1987)
8. Jokes From Outer Space (1987)
9. I'm a Two Times Tabler (1987)
10. I'm a Three Times Tabler (1987)
11. I'm a Four Times Tabler (1987)
12. I'm a Five Times Tabler (1987)
13. The Return of the Elephant Joke Book (1988)
14. Harriet and the Flying Teachers (1988)
15. The Christmas Pudding Joke Book (1989)
16. You and your Child in Hospital (1989)
17. Catchpole, King of the Castle (1989)
18. The Good Egg Yolk Book (1990)
19. Surprise, surprise, Queen Loonia! (1992)
20. Huff, Puff and Ruffly (1992)
21. The King's Sock (1993)
22. The Emerald Conspiracy (1993)
23. Thingumybob (1993)
24. The Invaders (1993)
25. Harry's Treasure Hunt (1995)
26. Follow the Kite (1997)
27. Lots to Do (1997)
28. Out to Work (1997)
29. Going Places (1997)
30. Nature is Busy (1997)
31. Little Toot (1999 classic abridged edition)
32. Sir Ben and the Robbers (1999)
33. Sir Ben and the Monster (1999)
34. Sir Ben and the Dragon (1999)
35. Dogs' Night (2000; illustrated with Allan Curless)
36. Return to the Hundred Acre Wood (2009)
37. Winnie-the-Pooh and the Royal Birthday (2016)
38. The Best Bear in All the World (2016)
39. Winnie-the-Pooh Meets the Queen (2016)
40. Once There Was a Bear: Tales of Before It All Began (2021)
