= Alexander Lenard =

Hungarian physician, writer, translator, painter, musician, and poet

Alexander Lenard (Hungarian: Lénárd Sándor; Latin: Alexander Lenardus; Budapest, 9 March 1910 – Dona Emma, Brazil, 13 April 1972) was a Hungarian physician, writer, translator, painter, musician, poet and occasional language instructor. He was born in Budapest, Hungary and died in Dona Emma, in the state of Santa Catarina, Brazil. He is best known as the Latin translator of A. A. Milne's Winnie the Pooh (Winnie Ille Pu). He wrote non-fiction and translated fiction and non fiction in German, Latin, Hungarian, Italian and English.

== Life ==
Lenard was born in the family of Jenő Lénárd (1878–1924) and Ilona Hoffmann (1888–1938), he was the first son in their family.

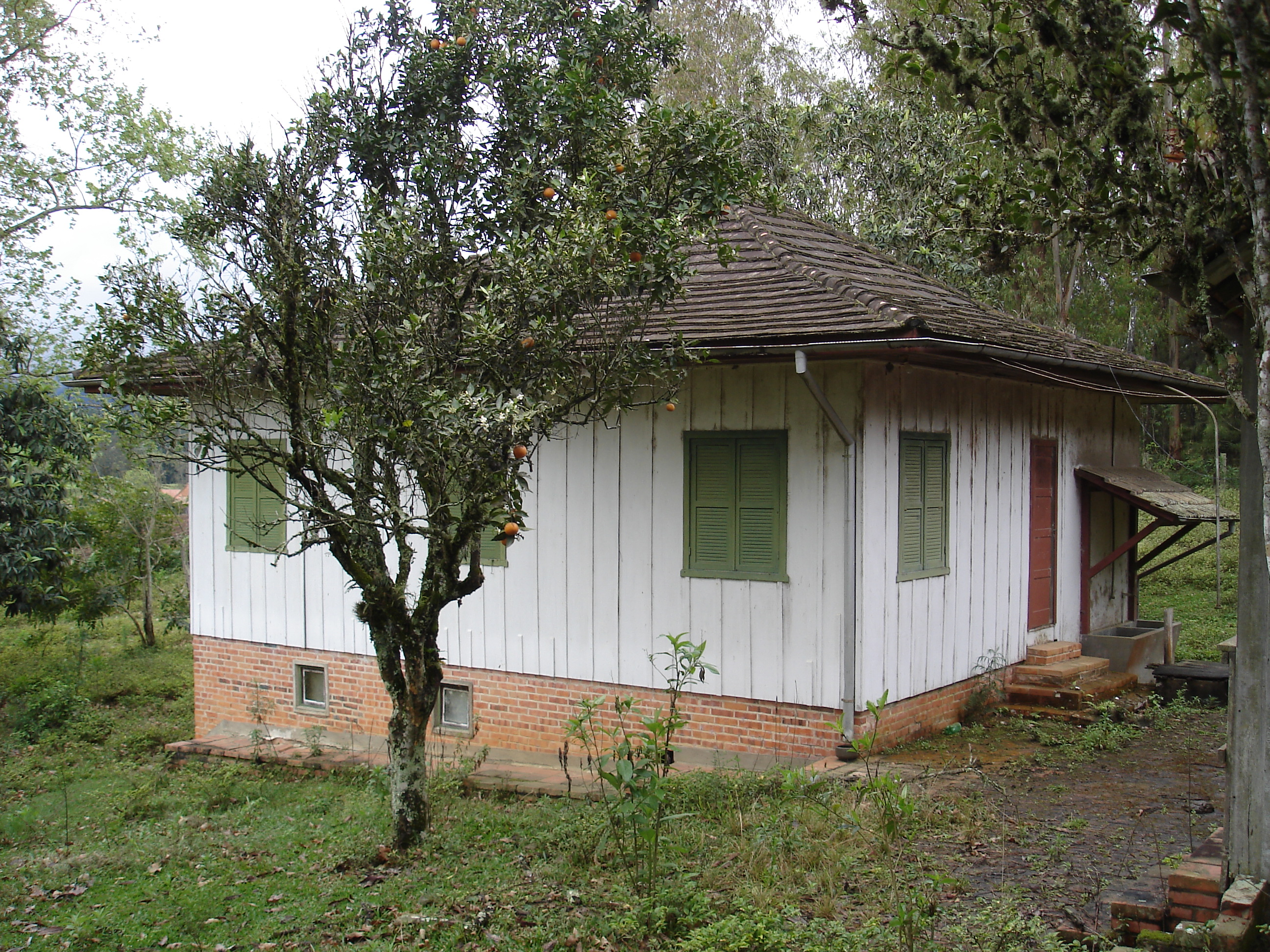
Alexander Lenard's home in Dona Emma.

In 1920 the Lénárd family moved from Hungary to Austria. His first studies were private lessons at home because he couldn't stand being at school. In 1920-1921 he began his study at Wiener Theresianum (a board school in Vienna) where he was hungry and cold, and the few days at home at weekends were a real happiness to him. He didn't stay long in this school, because their family moved to Klosterneuburg and there he finished his studies in 1928. During his leisure time he practiced playing piano, rowing, swimming and running.

Lénárd conducted his medical studies at the University of Vienna. He continued studying in the university till 1936 and had a good relationship with the professors and his fellow students; with some of them, the likes of Karl Adams and Egon Fenz, he had contacts till his death. During the 1930s, he travelled to Greece, Denmark, England, the Czech Republic, France, and Turkey. In 1936 he married Gerda Coste, who gave birth to their son, Hans-Gerd.

After the 1938 "Anschluss" with Germany, he escaped to Italy. There is no notice if he had obtained his certificate in medicine, because literature and poetry were more attractive to him. His staying in Italy he described as a very productive time for his poetry. At the beginning of the World War II he attempted to join the French Army in Basel as a volunteer but failed to do this. During World War II, he escaped the attention of the Fascist regime by leaving no "paper trail" (such as identity card or ration card). He survived by trading his medical services for food and shelter. His leisure hours were spent in the Vatican Library, reading texts in Latin until it became a colloquial language to him. He met his second wife, Andrietta Arborio di Gattinara from a noble Italian family, in 1942. His brother Károly presumably died in 1944 in a Nazi labour camp (Arbeitslager) while his sister settled in England. After the end of the war, his second son, Giovanni Sebastiano, was born in Rome.

In 1952, he emigrated to Brazil, where in 1956 he took part and earned some money in a São Paulo television programme called The Sky is the Limit, answering questions about J. S. Bach. Later he settled in the Dona Emma valley, where he bought a small farm with a house he made "invisible" by surrounding it with his favourite trees. He treated the local population medically until his death in 1972.

== Work ==
While in Brazil, he tutored the children of a local residents in Latin, and they expressed the wish for something interesting to read. In response, he translated Winnie the Pooh into Latin, for which he combed the classics for idiomatic expressions used during ancient times. He was working on this translation for about 7 years and could not find a publisher to have this work edited. And at last he published the first copies by his own money. Privately printed, the book gradually reached larger audiences until it became an international best-seller. He also wrote (prose and poetry), and non-fiction such as musical, culinary, linguistic and medical essays and studies. As of 2010 two of his original books have been published in English – The Valley of the Latin Bear (1965), and The Fine Art of Roman Cooking (1966).

== Bibliography ==
=== Fiction ===
- The valley of the Latin bear - in English: Dutton, 1965, in Hungarian (Völgy a világ végén): Magvető, 1967, in German (Die Kuh auf dem Bast): Stuttgart, 1963
- "A day in the invisible house" - in Hungarian (Egy nap a láthatatlan házban): Magvető, 1969, in German (Ein Tag im unsichtbaren Haus): Stuttgart, 1970
- "The Cagliostro Case"
- "The Great Bear drowns in the sea in Charleston"
- "Roman stories" - in Hungarian (Római történetek): Magvető, 1969
- "The fine art of Roman Cooking" - in English: Dutton, 1966, in German (Die Römische Küche): Stuttgart, 1963, in Hungarian (A római konyha): Magvető, 1986
- My family-stories - in Hungarian (Csaladtorteneteim): Typotex, 2010
- Adventures of three modern Hungarian knights - in Hungarian (Három modern magyar lovag kalandjai - Irodalmi Újság, 1 October 1957 (Párizs))
- Mussolini's "Liberation" - in Hungarian (Mussolini "felszabadítása" (olvasói levél) - Irodalmi Újság, 15 July 1960. (Párizs))
- A Few Words About Winnie-Ille-Pu - in Hungarian (Néhány szó a latin Micimackóról - Élet és irodalom, LIV. évf. 11. sz. 12 March 2010)
- The Byzantine Schnitzel - in Hungarian (A bizánci szelet - in: Magyar Nemzet, 7 May 1966. p. 7)

=== Non-fiction ===
In addition to his non fiction writing, Lenard authored essays and treatises on literary and medical topics.

==== Linguistic and literary ====
- The living Latin - in Hungarian (Az élő latin - Filológiai közlöny, 1972/1-2.)
- Seven days in Babylon - in German (Sieben Tage Babylonisch): Stuttgart, 1964, - in Hungarian (Egy magyar idegenvezető Bábel tornyában): Typotex, 2003
- "Hello Sadness" and "A Certain Smile" - in Hungarian ("Jónapot búbánat" és "Egy bizonyos mosoly" - Ertekezés Francois Sagan regényéről - Kultura, February-March 1957. (Sao Paulo))
- The poems of Weöres Sándor - in Hungarian (Weöres Sándor versei - Kultura, June 1959. (Sao Paulo))
- Walk on an old map of Budapest - co-author with Landy Dezso - in Hungarian (Séta egy régi pesti térképen - Kultura, January 1958. (Sao Paulo))
- The science and the piglet - in Hungarian (A tudomány és a kismalac - Kultura, January 1957. (Sao Paulo))
- Brazil - in Hungarian (Brazília - Irodalmi Újság, 15 December 1957. (Párizs))
- Winnie ille Pu - Latin translation of Winnie the Pooh by A. A. Milne, London, 1960.
- Tristitia salve - Latin translation of Bonjour Tristesse by Francoise Sagan, Stuttgart, 1964.

==== Medical ====
- About the Eugenics - in Hungarian (Az eugenikáról - Kortárs, 1985/2)
- Giving birth without pain - in Italian (Partorire senza dolore - Casa Editrice Mediterranea, Roma, 1950)
- The healthy and sick child - in Italian (Il Bambino Sano e Ammalato, [Róma], 1950)
- Controlling conception and the number of offsprings - in Italian (Controllo della concezione e limitazione della prole, [Róma], 1947)
- The medical office; contribution to the history of the medical ethics - in Italian (De officio medici; contributo alla storia dell'etica medica. [Rome], Tipografia della Bussola, 1947)

=== Poems ===
- Ex Ponto [Róma], 1947
- Orgelbuechlein [Róma], 1947
- Andrietta [Róma], 1949
- Asche [Róma], 1949
- Die Leute sagen [Róma], 1949

== Film portrayal ==
In 2009, the New York Film Festival premiered Lynne Sachs's The Last Happy Day, an experimental retelling of Lenard's life story from the intimate perspective of his distant cousin turned filmmaker. The film features unpublished letters from the 1940s to 1970s written by Lenard to his relatives in the United States, as well as interviews and archival photos. A year after the film's debut, the Hungarian Quarterly published an essay by Sachs along with some of Lenard's letters.

== Literature ==
In Robert Hellenga's 1998 novel The Fall of a Sparrow the Latin inscription for a tombstone is taken from the death notice for Alexander Lenard.
