= Bonjour Tristesse (1958 film) =

1958 film by Otto Preminger

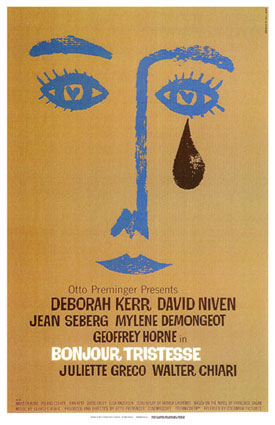
- Theatrical release poster by Saul Bass
- Directed by: Otto Preminger
- Screenplay by: Arthur Laurents
- Based on: Bonjour Tristesse by Françoise Sagan
- Produced by: Otto Preminger
- Starring: Deborah Kerr; David Niven; Jean Seberg; Mylène Demongeot; Geoffrey Horne; Juliette Gréco; Walter Chiari
- Cinematography: Georges Périnal
- Edited by: Helga Cranston
- Music by: Georges Auric
- Distributed by: Columbia Pictures
- Release dates: 15 January 1958 (New York City); 12 May 1958 (United Kingdom)
- Running time: 94 minutes
- Countries: United Kingdom; United States
- Language: English
- Box office: $13.2 million

Bonjour Tristesse ('Hello, Sadness') is a 1958 coming-of-age drama film in CinemaScope, produced and directed by Otto Preminger from a screenplay by Arthur Laurents, based on the 1954 novel by Françoise Sagan. The film stars Deborah Kerr, David Niven, Jean Seberg, Mylène Demongeot and Geoffrey Horne, and features Juliette Gréco, Walter Chiari, Martita Hunt and Roland Culver. It was released by Columbia Pictures. This film had color and black-and-white sequences, a technique unusual for the 1950s, but widely used in silent films and early sound films.

== Plot ==
Cécile is a spoiled, free-spirited, and idiosyncratic teenage girl who shares a life of luxury and frivolity with her widowed father Raymond, a wealthy playboy. At a nightclub in Paris with Raymond and his latest mistress, Cécile wonders if she will ever find happiness again as she felt at the beginning of the previous summer on the French Riviera, when she was 17 years old.

In a flashback to the previous summer, Cécile and Raymond are enjoying their vacation at a villa on the Riviera with Raymond's latest conquest, the flighty and superficial Elsa, who is not much older than Cécile. Cécile meets Philippe, an attractive young law student vacationing with his mother at a nearby villa, and the two quickly develop a mutual attraction. One evening, Raymond receives a letter from Anne, a fashion designer and a friend of his late wife, who has accepted his invitation to spend the summer with them. Upon arrival, Anne is initially upset when Cécile informs her of Elsa's presence.

Over the next few days, Cécile and Elsa notice how Raymond and Anne have grown close. While they are all attending a local casino one night, Raymond and Anne are in his car talking when he expresses his feelings for her and kisses her. Shortly afterwards, Cécile spots Raymond driving off with Anne. While Cécile is angry at Raymond, she is proud that her father has won over the "unattainable" Anne. Cécile lies to a drunken Elsa that Raymond drove Anne home after she fell ill. Bursting into tears, Elsa leaves with Pablo, an old friend from South America, to stay in a hotel.

The next morning, Raymond and Anne inform Cécile that they plan to get married, and Cécile feigns happiness for the couple. Later, Anne interrupts Cécile and Philippe as they are about to have sex. Anne then asserts that Cécile should stop seeing Philippe for a time and instead focus on studying for her upcoming school examinations, to which Raymond agrees. Feeling that her own relation with her father and their carefree lifestyle will be disrupted by Anne's presence, Cécile schemes to break up the relationship. When Elsa returns to the villa to pick up her belongings, Cécile instructs her to provoke Raymond's jealousy by pretending to be romantically involved with Philippe.

When Cécile, Raymond, and Anne go out to dinner with the Lombards—Raymond's business partner and his wife—Raymond sees Elsa dancing with Philippe and becomes jealous. A few days later, Elsa excitedly tells Cécile that Raymond called to apologize and has asked to meet her that afternoon. After lunch, Raymond lies to Anne that he is meeting with the Lombards and leaves. Cécile secretly follows Anne, who spots Raymond and Elsa together in the woods. Overhearing Raymond tell Elsa that he only proposed to Anne so that she would have sex with him, Anne runs back to the villa and drives off in her car, ignoring Cécile's pleas to stay. Cécile and Raymond are soon informed that Anne's car has been found at the bottom of the sea.

In the present, Cécile realizes that Anne allowed them to believe that her death was accidental rather than suicide. She has not heard from Philippe since that summer, and Elsa is now living in South America. Cécile and Raymond, who have an unspoken agreement never to mention the previous summer, are planning to spend their next summer on the Italian Riviera for a change. While removing her makeup with cold cream in front of a mirror, Cécile's eyes fill with tears as she is haunted by memories of the previous summer.

== Cast ==
- Deborah Kerr as Anne Larsen
- David Niven as Raymond, Cécile's father
- Jean Seberg as Cécile
- Mylène Demongeot as Elsa
- Geoffrey Horne as Philippe, Cécile's summer fling on the Riviera
- Juliette Gréco as herself, singing "Bonjour Tristesse"
- Walter Chiari as Pablo, a friend of Elsa
- Martita Hunt as Philippe's mother
- Roland Culver as Mr. Lombard, Raymond's business partner
- Jean Kent as Mrs. Lombard
- David Oxley as Jacques, Cécile's new friend in Paris at start of film
- Elga Andersen as Denise, Raymond's new mistress in Paris at start of film
- Jeremy Burnham as Hubert, Cécile's painter friend in Paris at start of film

== Production ==
Filming took place from August 1 to mid-October 1957 in Paris and Saint-Tropez, France, while interior scenes were filmed in London, England, and the villa scenes were filmed on location at Pointe Croisette in Cannes, France.

== Critical reception ==
The film met with a lukewarm critical reception at the time. The British Film Institute's Monthly Film Bulletin wrote, "The best performance is David Niven's; he gives his part a pathetic touch that the writing never attains. Jean Seberg, who speaks rather than acts her lines, turns in the least effective performance. Bonjour Tristesse is an elegant, ice cold, charade of emotions, completely artificial and eventually torpid." Others enjoyed it rather more and it had some unexpected fans. François Truffaut described Seberg as "The best actress in Europe". Jean-Luc Godard said, "The character played by Jean Seberg (in Breathless) was a continuation of her role in Bonjour Tristesse, I could have taken the last shot of Preminger's film and started after dissolving to a title: 'Three years later'." Stanley Kauffmann described Bonjour Tristesse as "tedious".

The Washington Star's review was mixed: “it is a bitter-sweet bacchanal that could not be more candid in its picture of shallow humanity and how it got that way. Its very flaws, including the unevenness of its half-baked, boozy dream aspects give it emphasis….It is greatly helpful…that its landscapes are those of Paris and the French Riviera, the only possible appropriately sophisticated playgrounds for its wantons. It is even fitting, somehow, that a callow neophyte to acting such as Jean Seberg plays the bewildered heroine of Miss Sagan’s ballad of lost souls. The former’s performance conveys the impression that both she and the original author are over their heads in the experience they are encountering.”.

The New York Post wrote: “two English stars, Deborah Kerr and David Niven, whose acting is of the very first water….The novel, which was widely read for…the outspoken sex and the fact that a young French Mlle. was doing the outspeaking, is brought to the screen reasonably intact….that something has been lost cannot be doubted. The excitements of both sin and sorrow seem considerably muted, and no great duels of wit have been brought in to fill the gap. You feel as if, though pleasant as a place to visit briefly for the sunbathing or swimming, it would be boring to stay longer. It is a pleasant picture, one might almost say innocuous, and that surely means it has missed something it should have hit, and hit hard if it were to be a big success.”

The Philadelphia Inquirer was approving: “A remarkable screen drama….Preminger and…Laurents…have caught not only Mlle. Sagan’s style in telling of the witless evil wrought by a teen-age Electra, but the dance-macabre atmosphere to which the girl and her father are forever bound once brought face-to-face with their own worthlessness and frivolity….Inspired casting plays a vital part….Seberg gives a startlingly good performance….Personality and skill, apparently, rather than suitable accents have influenced Preminger’s casting. And so although the characters are French, voices are everything from British to plain American midwest, and it doesn’t matter.”

In 2012, Tony Paley of The Guardian described it as "an example of Hollywood's golden age, and both its star and its famously tyrannical director are ripe for rediscovery." Also in 2012, Keith Uhlich of Time Out New York wrote, "[T]he director uses the expansive CinemaScope frame and his eye for luxuriant, clinical mise en scène to soberly probe rather than gleefully prod. The cast is across-the-board exemplary. Niven and Kerr keenly satirize their onscreen iconographies—the cad and the goody-goody, respectively—but it's Seberg who cuts deepest."

On the website Rotten Tomatoes, the film holds an approval rating of 84% based on reviews from 25 critics, with an average rating of 7.2/10.

== Remake ==
A second film adaptation of the novel was released in 2024. It was written and directed by Durga Chew-Bose and stars Lily McInerny, Claes Bang, Nailia Harzoune, Aliocha Schneider, and Chloë Sevigny.
