= Winnie Denker =

Danish photographer

Winnie Denker (born 1938) is a Danish photographer known for her pictures of the Eiffel Tower and the State Hermitage Museum of Saint Petersburg.

== Life ==
Denker was born in 1938 in Denmark.

Denker started her career photographing jewellery. She was then asked by UNESCO to take pictures of World Heritage Sites. Her friend Pierre Bidault was asked to design special lighting for Paris's icon and that is when Denker was inspired.

Denker is from Denmark and her obsession with the tower began with a picture taken on 4 January 1986, She is captivated by the lighting and she has taken many pictures at unusual angles. She has published three books containing her photographs. For her first book she had the bad luck to choose the writer Françoise Sagan to supply the text. Sagan disliked the Eiffel Tower but she was convinced to undertake the project when she saw Denker's images.
