= A Certain Smile (disambiguation) =

A Certain Smile is a novel written by Françoise Sagan.

A Certain Smile may also refer to:

- A Certain Smile (film), an adaptation of the novel starring Rossano Brazzi and Joan Fontaine
- "A Certain Smile" (song), written for the film and sung by Johnny Mathis
