= Bonjour Tristesse (2024 film) =

Film by Durga Chew-Bose

- Theatrical release poster
- Directed by: Durga Chew-Bose
- Screenplay by: Durga Chew-Bose
- Based on: Bonjour Tristesse by Françoise Sagan
- Produced by: Christina Piovesan; Noah Segal; Benito Mueller; Wolfgang Mueller; Joe Iacono; Julie Viez; Durga Chew-Bose; Katie Bird Nolan; Lindsay Tapscott
- Starring: Lily McInerny; Claes Bang; Nailia Harzoune; Aliocha Schneider; Chloë Sevigny
- Cinematography: Maximilian Pittner
- Edited by: Amélie Labrèche
- Music by: Lesley Barber
- Production companies: Babe Nation Films; Elevation Pictures; Barry Films; Cinenovo; Film Constellation; MIPA Management
- Distributed by: Elevation Pictures (Canada); Universal Pictures (select territories)
- Release dates: September 5, 2024 (TIFF); May 2, 2025 (Canada)
- Running time: 111 minutes
- Countries: Canada; France; Germany; United Kingdom; United States
- Languages: English; French
- Box office: $459,616

Bonjour Tristesse is a 2024 coming-of-age romantic drama film written and directed by Durga Chew-Bose in her feature-length directorial debut, and starring Lily McInerny, Claes Bang, Nailia Harzoune, Aliocha Schneider, and Chloë Sevigny. Based on the 1954 novel by Françoise Sagan, its plot follows an eighteen-year-old girl whose summer on the French Riviera with her father is disrupted by an unexpected guest. It is the second film adaptation of Sagan's novel after the 1958 version directed by Otto Preminger, starring Deborah Kerr, David Niven, and Jean Seberg.

The film premiered in the Discovery section of the Toronto International Film Festival on September 5, 2024. It was released theatrically in Canada on May 2, 2025, by Elevation Pictures.

== Plot ==
Teenager Cécile is spending a slow, pleasant summer on the French Riviera with her widowed father Raymond and his girlfriend, a dancer named Elsa, who is superficial, perceptive, and gets along well with Cécile. Cécile splits time between her boyfriend Cyril, her father and Elsa.

After some time, fashion designer Anne Larsen, an old friend of Raymond and his late wife, joins the vacation and upends the dynamic: Anne is cultured, intelligent, hard-working, and regards herself as a kind of parent to Cécile. Anne upsets Cécile by questioning her about school exams, which neither Raymond nor Cécile care about. Though Cécile and Anne connect over fashion design, tensions begin to increase.

Reticent but thoughtful Anne soon becomes Raymond's lover and they become engaged. Elsa moves out and Anne tries to take over parenting Cécile, whom she thinks has too much freedom. As the summer progresses, Anne becomes the main focus of Raymond's time and interest. Anne tells Cécile to stop seeing Cyril and to study for her autumn exams. Cécile petulantly resents the interruption to her leisurely summer and devises a plan to prevent the marriage.

Cécile arranges for Raymond to chance upon Cyril and Elsa pretending to be a couple. Raymond becomes jealous of the younger Cyril and begins to pursue Elsa again. Cécile is triumphant, but misunderstands Anne's sensitivity; after seeing Raymond and Elsa together in the woods, Anne drives off in tears and her car plunges from a cliff in an apparent suicide.

Cécile and her father return to the life they lived before Anne interrupted their summer. They discuss the impact Anne had on their lives. Cécile lives with the knowledge that her manipulations led to Anne's death and remembers the summer they shared.

== Cast ==
- Lily McInerny as Cécile
- Claes Bang as Raymond
- Chloë Sevigny as Anne Larsen
- Naïlia Harzoune as Elsa
- Aliocha Schneider as Cyril
- Nathalie Richard as Nathalie

== Production ==
=== Development ===
In May 2023, Film Constellation bought the rights to adapt Françoise Sagan's 1954 novel Bonjour Tristesse, with Durga Chew-Bose attached to direct the film. Producers include Babe Nation Films' Katie Bird Nolan and Lindsay Tapscott for whom it took three years to secure rights to the novel, and for whom it had been a seven-year project prior to the commencement of shooting. Also producing are Elevation Pictures' Noah Segal and Christina Piovesan, Wolfgang Mueller and Benito Mueller of Barry Films and Cinenovo's Julie Viez. Executive producers are Fabien Westerhoff for Constellation Productions, Suzanne Court, and Françoise Sagan's son Denis Westhoff.

=== Filming ===
Principal photography began in May 2023 in Cassis in the south of France.

== Release ==
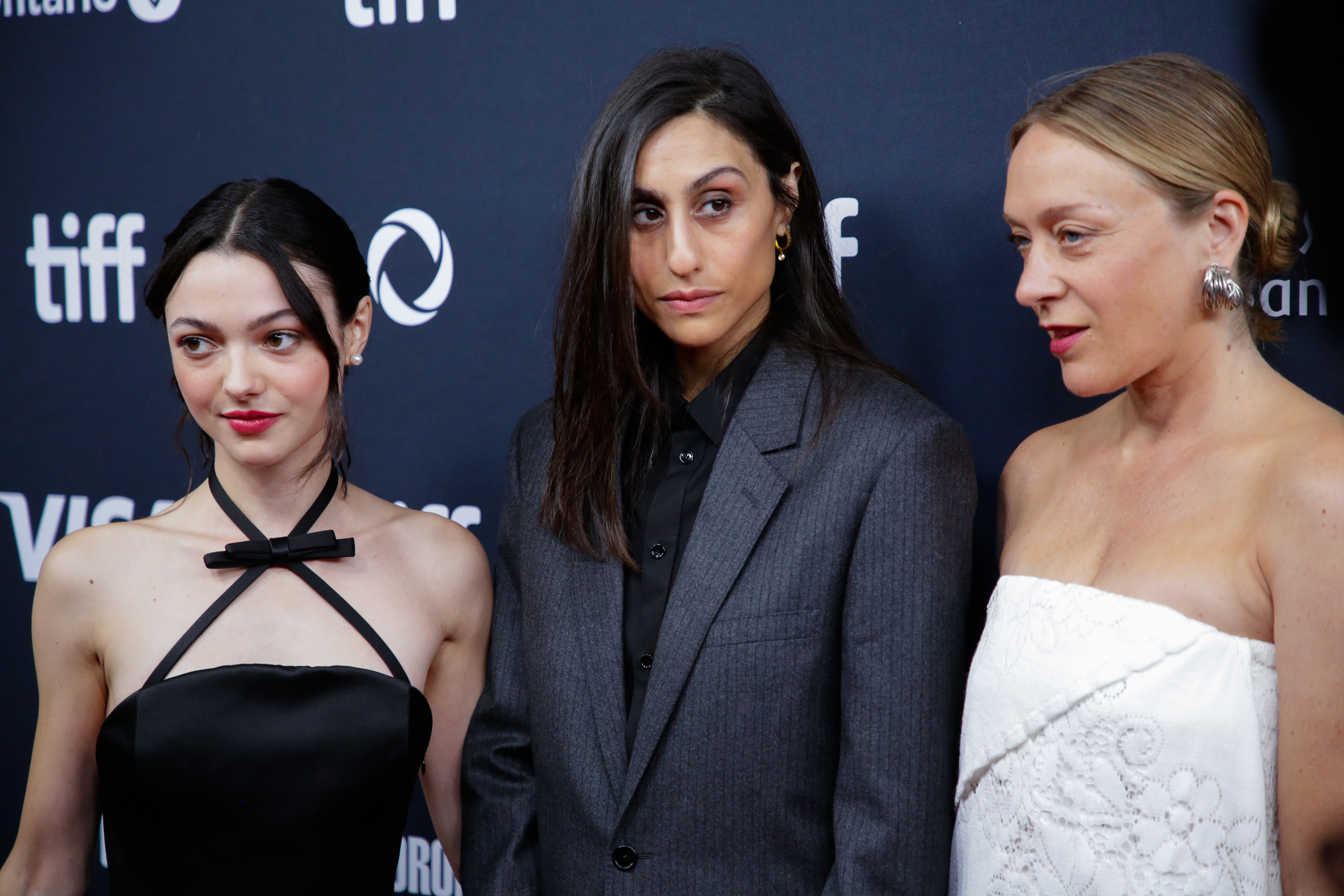
Lily McInerny, Durga Chew-Bose, and Chloë Sevigny at the 2024 Toronto International Film Festival

Bonjour Tristesse premiered in the Discovery section of the Toronto International Film Festival on September 5, 2024. In December 2024, Greenwich Entertainment acquired U.S. distribution rights, while Elevation Pictures, which co-produced the film, distributed it in Canada. The film was also sold to independent distributors in Spain, Portugal, MENA, the CIS, former Yugoslavia, Bulgaria, and airlines, with Universal Pictures acquiring rights to the rest of the world. Bonjour Tristesse was released theatrically in Canada and the United States on May 2, 2025.

=== Home media ===
Kino Lorber released Bonjour Tristesse on DVD on July 8, 2025.

== Reception ==
=== Box office ===
Bonjour Tristesse grossed $256,136 in Canada and $203,480 internationally, making for a worldwide gross of $459,616.

=== Critical response ===
Bonjour Tristesse received mostly positive reviews from critics. On the review aggregator website Rotten Tomatoes, the film holds an approval rating of 68% based on 57 reviews, with an average rating of 6.5/10. Metacritic, which uses a weighted average, assigned the film a score of 64 out of 100, based on 14 critics, indicating "generally favorable" reviews.

Natalia Winkelman of The New York Times, making the film her 'Critic's Choice', wrote: "Chew-Bose directs her camera to elegantly glance off bodies, fabrics and seawater. She individualizes her characters through habits and gestures, like the different ways each woman eats her morning apple. A work of image and mood, Bonjour Tristesse captures the mythopoetic wonder of an adolescent summer, and the effect is trancelike."

In The Hollywood Reporter, Caryn James wrote: "The first film by writer-director Durga Chew-Bose, its story of adolescent longing, jealousy and sexual awakening, updated here to the present, is always glorious to look at—from the brightly colored floor tiles to the glittering water. But once you're inside, its emotional trajectory is curiously flat, even though the cast includes two usually vibrant actors, Claes Bang and Chloë Sevigny."

IndieWire's Kate Erbland graded the film a "B", writing: "While remakes can feel, by their very nature, like the worst kind of retread (to say nothing of remakes of things first made in another medium), Chew-Bose's directorial debut is a sharp offering that adds to the mystique of the original material and makes a strong case for its own existence."

On RogerEbert.com, Marya E. Gates wrote: "Naïlia Harzoune is a wonder as Raymond's current lover Elsa, her passion infusing the film with its sole sense of energy or life. Although the character is more reserved by design, Chloë Sevigny as Ann, the best friend of Cécile's late mother and Raymond's soon-to-be new lover, gives the film's best performance. Behind her reserve is a scathing caustic wit, one that makes you think and laugh. It's a pity, then, that the leisurely pace hampers the escalation of emotions all three women feel, ending the film with a whimper rather than a bang. I'm sure the lowkey tone will work for some viewers, but for me, despite the beautifully rendered summer heat, the film ultimately left me cold."

=== Accolades ===
Award/association	Year	Category	Subject	Result	Ref.
Aegean Film Festival	2025	Audience Award – Feature Fiction	Durga Chew-Bose	Nominated	
Calgary International Film Festival	2024	Best International Narrative Feature	Durga Chew-Bose	Nominated	
La Roche-sur-Yon International Film Festival	2024	Compétition internationale	Durga Chew-Bose	Nominated	
Munich Film Festival	2025	CineCoPro Award	Durga Chew-Bose	Nominated	
Palm Springs International Film Festival	2025	Directors to Watch	Durga Chew-Bose	Won	
Palm Springs International Film Festival	2025	New Voices/New Visions Grand Jury Prize	Durga Chew-Bose	Nominated	
