= Roger Van Hool =

Belgian actor (1940–2023)

- Van Hool in La Chamade (1968)
- Born: 27 September 1940; Antwerp, German-occupied Belgium and Northern France
- Died: 28 August 2023 (aged 82); Paris, France
- Occupation: Actor

Roger Van Hool (27 September 1940 – 28 August 2023) was a Belgian actor. He worked in the theatre in addition to his film and television career. In 1977, he received the Ève du Théâtre.

== Biography ==
Born in Antwerp on 27 September 1940, Van Hool spoke Brabantian with his mother and French with his father. To improve his French, he was sent to a boarding school in Nivelles. He began his acting career with the Nederlands Kamertoneel in Antwerp. After that, he moved to Paris and participated in the theatrical production Le Knack. In the years following, he appeared in multiple French theatre productions, as well as films and television series. In the 1960s, he held roles in the films Oscar and La Chamade.

During the 1970s, Van Hool collaborated with Belgian film director André Delvaux for the films Rendezvous at Bray and Woman Between Wolf and Dog. A decade later, he also collaborated with Delvaux in The Abyss. In the 1980s, Van Hool held prominent roles in the films The Woman Next Door and Iris. He briefly retired and lived in the Pyrenees before returning in the mid-1990s for De ooggetuige, directed by Emile Degelin.

Roger Van Hool died in Paris on 28 August 2023, at the age of 82.

== Filmography ==
- Oscar (1967)
- À tout casser (1967)
- La Chamade (1968)
- Catherine (1969)
- Et qu'ça saute ! (1970)
- Rendez-vous at Bray (1971)
- Louisa (1972)
- The Killer Is on the Phone (1972)
- Prenez garde aux moroses (1973)
- Le Soldat Laforêt (1974)
- Madame Baptiste [fr] (1974)
- Krystyna and Her Night (1977)
- The Garden of Torture (1977)
- Woman Between Wolf and Dog (1979)
- L'Enfant-roi (1980)
- Une femme en fuite (1982)
- The Abyss (1988)
- Un été d'orages (1989)
- Tanguy (2001)
- If I Were a Rich Man (2002)
- Aux abois (2005)
- Conversations with My Gardener (2007)
- Bank Error in Your Favour (2009)
- United Passions (2014)
- As Above, So Below (2014)
- The Odyssey (2016)
- The Truth (2019)
- Isn't She Lovely (2020)
