= 38th Independent Spirit Awards =

US film awards ceremony in 2023

38th Film Independent Spirit Awards
- Awarded for: Best in independent film and independent television
- Date: March 4, 2023
- Site: Santa Monica Pier; Santa Monica, California, U.S.
- Hosted by: Hasan Minhaj

Highlights
- Best Feature: Everything Everywhere All at Once
- Most awards: Film: Everything Everywhere All at Once (7); TV: The Bear (2)
- Most nominations: Film: Everything Everywhere All at Once (8); TV: Abbott Elementary (3)

Television coverage
- Network: YouTube (through @filmindependent + @imdb)

The 38th Film Independent Spirit Awards, honoring the best independent films and television series of 2022, were presented by Film Independent on March 4, 2023. The film nominations were announced live via YouTube on November 22, 2022, by Raúl Castillo and Taylour Paige, while the television nominations were announced on December 13, 2022, by Asia Kate Dillon.

Like last year, the ceremony was separated from its previous longtime berth on the day before the Academy Awards. Instead, there were eight days separating the ceremonies, with the 95th Academy Awards taking place on March 12, 2023. This ceremony occurred during the middle of final Oscar voting, taking place between March 2 and March 7, meaning the winners of this year's ceremony may have had an impact on Oscar voters.

For the first time since 1997, the ceremony wasn't broadcast live on the American basic cable channel IFC but instead streamed live on IMDb's YouTube channel, as well as both Film Independent's YouTube channel and Twitter account. American comedian and actor Hasan Minhaj hosted the ceremony.

The A24 absurdist science-fiction comedy-drama Everything Everywhere All at Once won seven awards, including Best Feature, sweeping every category it was nominated for and winning the most awards for a single film in the history of the Film Independent Spirit Awards.

== Changes ==
This year, gender-neutral categories were introduced. The organization had switched the traditionally separated male and female lead and supporting categories for film and television, and instead combined them with ten nominations each in two new categories: Best Lead Performance and Best Supporting Performance. The same had become true for the television categories with Best Lead Performance in a New Scripted Series as well as the newly added award for Best Supporting Performance in a New Scripted Series. Additionally, a retired film category was re-introduced: Best Breakthrough Performance; it was discontinued in 2005, but is limited to only five nominees. Film Independent had also increased the budget cap for eligible films to $30 million to account for the rising cost of production. Over the years, the budget cap had increased incrementally from $20 million in 2006 to $22.5 million in 2019. The budget cap for the Independent Spirit John Cassavetes Award, presented to a film's writer, director and producer, also increased from $500K to $1 million. In response to the then-continuing impact of COVID-19 on filmmakers and the industry, Film Independent once again waived the theatrical run typically required for eligibility, ensuring more opportunities for independent filmmakers to be recognized and celebrated.

== Winners and nominees ==
=== Film ===
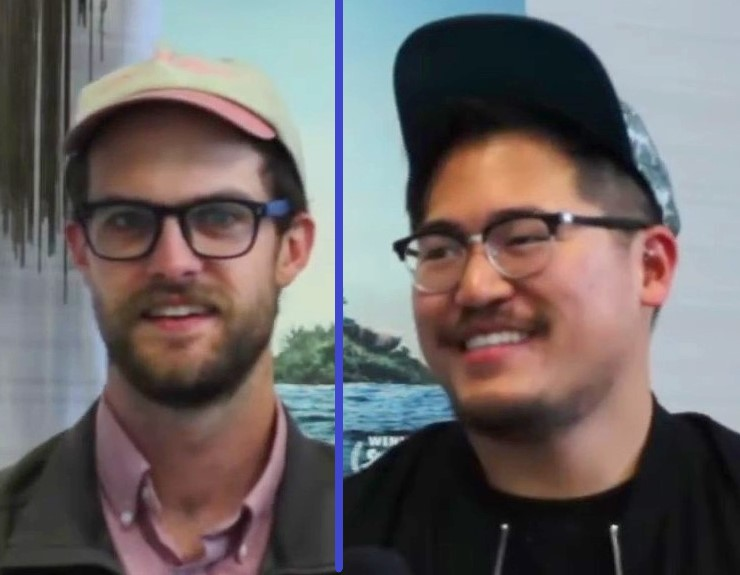
Daniel Scheinert and Daniel Kwan, Best Feature co-winners, and Best Director and Best Screenplay winners

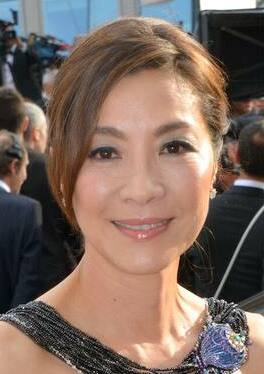
Michelle Yeoh, Best Lead Performance winner

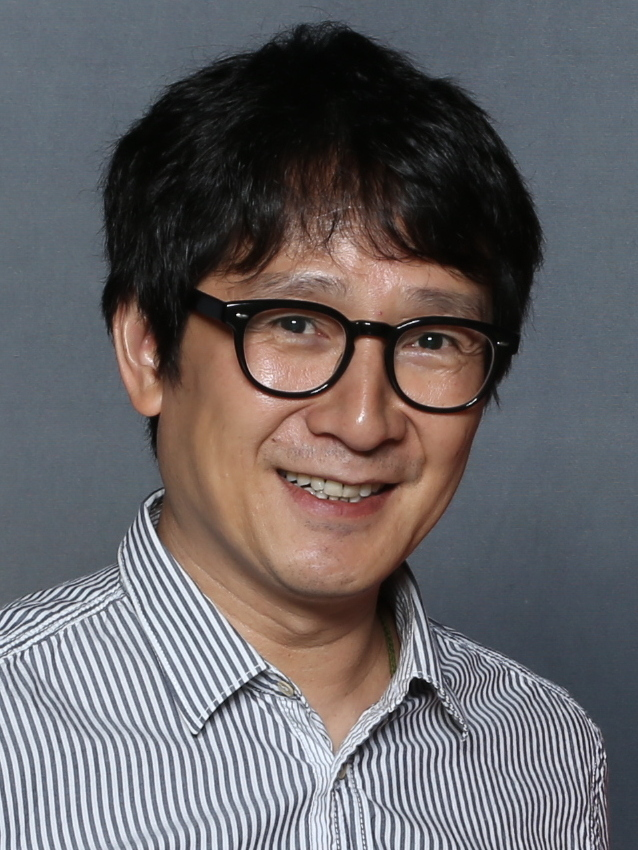
Ke Huy Quan, Best Supporting Performance winner

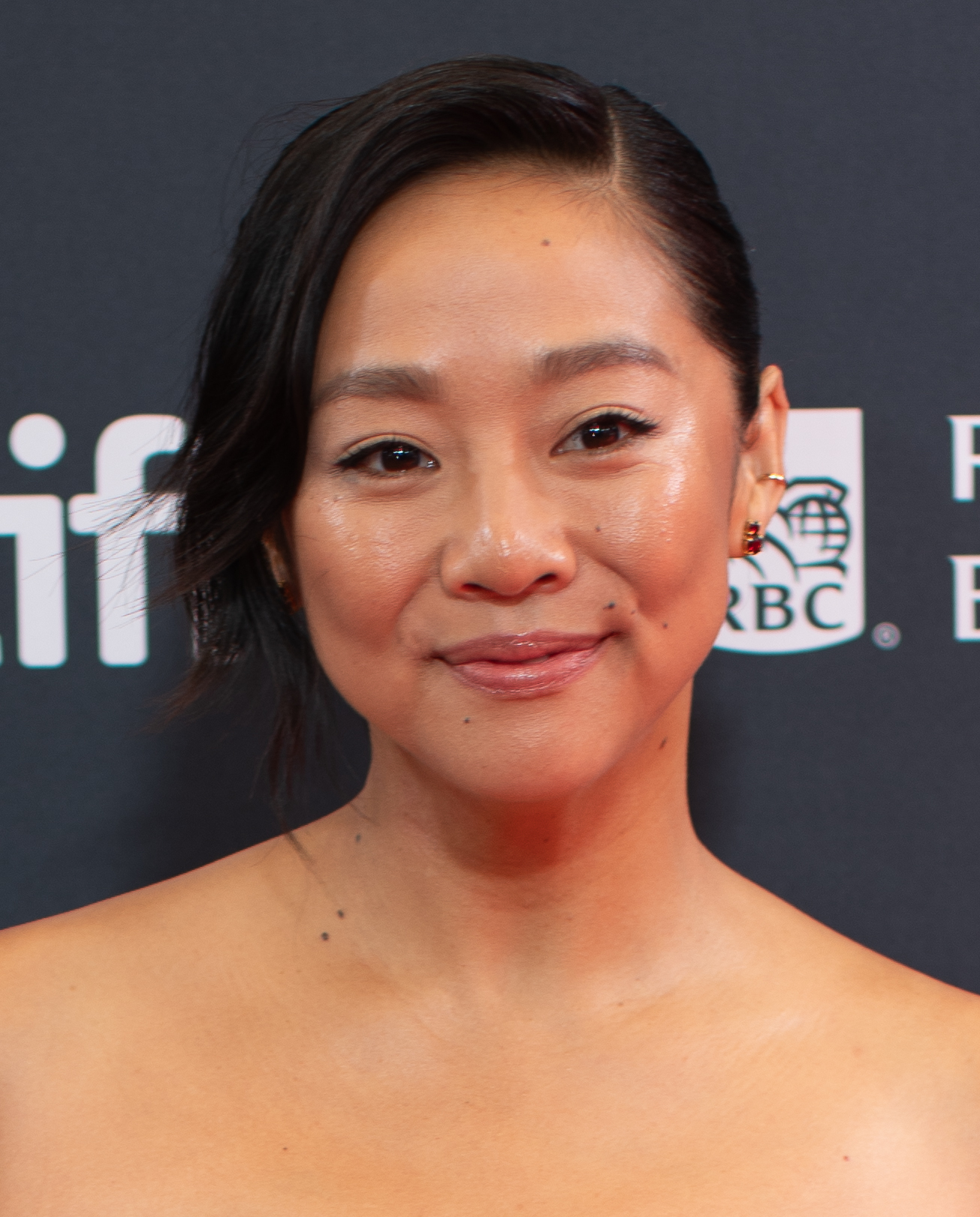
Stephanie Hsu, Best Breakthrough Performance winner

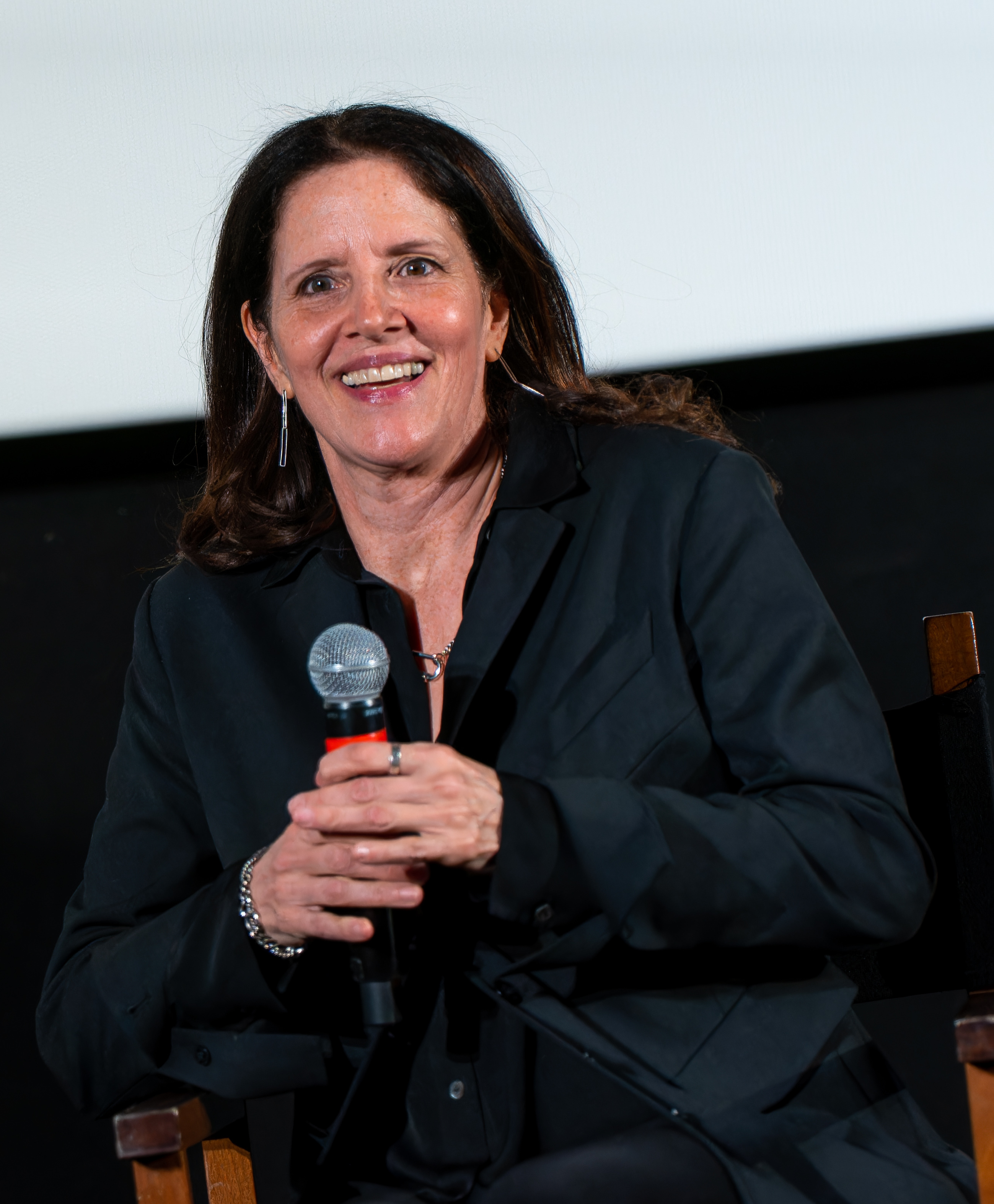
Laura Poitras, Best Documentary Feature co-winner

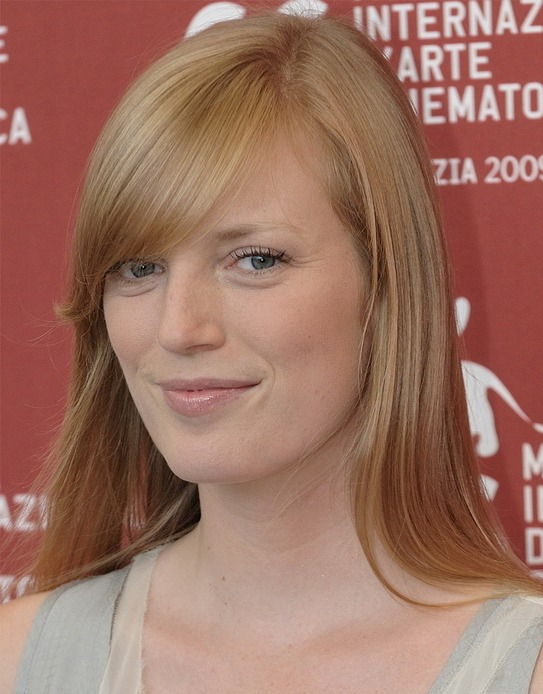
Sarah Polley, Robert Altman Award co-winner

Best Feature	Best Director
Everything Everywhere All at Once – Daniel Kwan, Mike Larocca, Anthony Russo, Joe Russo, Daniel Scheinert, and Jonathan Wang: Bones and All – Timothée Chalamet, Francesco Melzi d'Eril, Luca Guadagnino, David Kajganich, Lorenzo Mieli, Marco Morabito, Gabriele Moratti, Theresa Park, and Peter Spears; Our Father, the Devil – Ellie Foumbi and Joseph Mastantuono; Tár – Todd Field, Scott Lambert, and Alexandra Milchan; Women Talking – Dede Gardner, Jeremy Kleiner, and Frances McDormand	Daniel Kwan and Daniel Scheinert – Everything Everywhere All at Once: Todd Field – Tár; Kogonada – After Yang; Sarah Polley – Women Talking; Halina Reijn – Bodies Bodies Bodies
Best Lead Performance	Best Supporting Performance
Michelle Yeoh – Everything Everywhere All at Once as Evelyn Quan Wang: Cate Blanchett – Tár as Lydia Tár; Dale Dickey – A Love Song as Faye; Mia Goth – Pearl as Pearl; Regina Hall – Honk for Jesus. Save Your Soul. as Trinitie Childs; Paul Mescal – Aftersun as Calum Paterson; Aubrey Plaza – Emily the Criminal as Emily; Jeremy Pope – The Inspection as Ellis French; Andrea Riseborough – To Leslie as Leslie Rowlands; Taylor Russell – Bones and All as Maren Yearly	Ke Huy Quan – Everything Everywhere All at Once as Waymond Wang: Jamie Lee Curtis – Everything Everywhere All at Once as Deirdre Beaubeirdre; Brian Tyree Henry – Causeway as James Aucoin; Nina Hoss – Tár as Sharon Goodnow; Brian d'Arcy James – The Cathedral as Richard Damrosch; Trevante Rhodes – Bruiser as Porter; Theo Rossi – Emily the Criminal as Youcef; Mark Rylance – Bones and All as Sully; Jonathan Tucker – Palm Trees and Power Lines as Tom; Gabrielle Union – The Inspection as Inez French
Best Breakthrough Performance	Best Screenplay
Stephanie Hsu – Everything Everywhere All at Once as Joy Wang / Jobu Tupaki: Frankie Corio – Aftersun as Sophie Paterson; Gracija Filipović – Murina as Julija; Lily McInerny – Palm Trees and Power Lines as Lea; Daniel Zolghadri – Funny Pages as Robert	Daniel Kwan and Daniel Scheinert – Everything Everywhere All at Once: Lena Dunham – Catherine Called Birdy; Todd Field – Tár; Kogonada – After Yang; Sarah Polley – Women Talking
Best First Feature	Best First Screenplay
Aftersun – Charlotte Wells (director); Mark Ceryak, Amy Jackson, Barry Jenkins, and Adele Romanski (producers): Emily the Criminal – John Patton Ford (director); Tyler Davidson, Aubrey Plaza, and Drew Sykes (producers); The Inspection – Elegance Bratton (director); Effie T. Brown and Chester Algernal Gordon (producers); Murina – Antoneta Alamat Kusijanović (director); Danijel Pek and Rodrigo Teixeira (producers); Palm Trees and Power Lines – Jamie Dack (director); Leah Chen Baker (producer)	John Patton Ford – Emily the Criminal: Joel Kim Booster – Fire Island; Jamie Dack and Audrey Findlay; story by Jamie Dack – Palm Trees and Power Lines; K.D. Dávila – Emergency; Sarah DeLappe; story by Kristen Roupenian – Bodies Bodies Bodies
Best Documentary Feature	Best International Film
All the Beauty and the Bloodshed – Laura Poitras (director/producer); Howard Gertler, Nan Goldin, Yoni Golijov, and John Lyons (producers): All That Breathes – Shaunak Sen (director/producer); Teddy Leifer and Aman Mann (producers); A House Made of Splinters – Simon Lereng Wilmont (director); Monica Hellström (producer); Midwives – Snow Hnin Ei Hlaing (director/producer); Mila Aung-Thwin, Ulla Lehmann, and Bob Moore (producers); Riotsville, U.S.A. – Sierra Pettengill (director); Sara Archambault and Jamila Wignot (producers)	Joyland (Pakistan / United States) – Saim Sadiq: Corsage (Austria / Belgium / England / France / Italy / Luxembourg) – Marie Kreutzer; Leonor Will Never Die (Philippines) – Martika Ramirez Escobar; Return to Seoul (Belgium / France / Romania / South Korea) – Davy Chou; Saint Omer (France) – Alice Diop
Best Cinematography	Best Editing
Florian Hoffmeister – Tár: Hélène Louvart – Murina; Gregory Oke – Aftersun; Eliot Rockett – Pearl; Anisia Uzeyman – Neptune Frost	Paul Rogers – Everything Everywhere All at Once: Dean Fleischer Camp and Nick Paley – Marcel the Shell with Shoes On; Ricky D'Ambrose – The Cathedral; Blair McClendon – Aftersun; Monika Willi – Tár

==== Films with multiple nominations and awards ====
Films that received multiple nominations
Nominations	Film
8	Everything Everywhere All at Once
7	Tár
5	Aftersun
4	Emily the Criminal
4	Palm Trees and Power Lines
3	Bones and All
3	The Cathedral
3	The Inspection
3	Murina
3	Women Talking
2	After Yang
2	Bodies Bodies Bodies
2	Holy Emy
2	Honk for Jesus. Save Your Soul.
2	A Love Song
2	Pearl

Films that won multiple awards
Awards	Film
7	Everything Everywhere All at Once

=== Television ===
Quinta Brunson, Best Lead Performance in a New Scripted Series winner

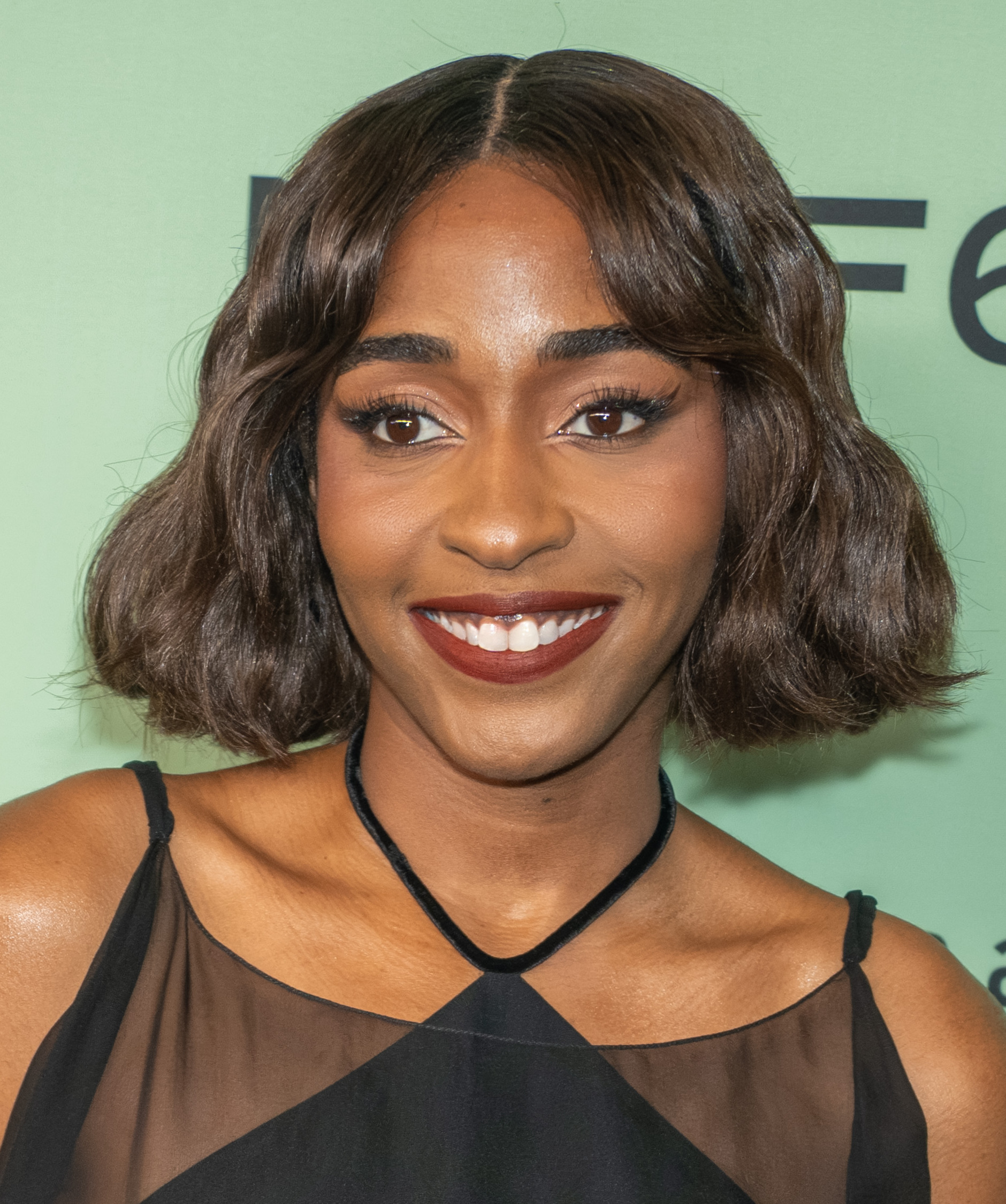
Ayo Edebiri, Best Supporting Performance in a New Scripted Series winner

Best New Scripted Series	Best New Non-Scripted or Documentary Series
The Bear (FX on Hulu): Pachinko (Apple TV+); The Porter (BET+ / CBC Television); Severance (Apple TV+); Station Eleven (HBO Max)	The Rehearsal (HBO): Children of the Underground (FX); Mind Over Murder (HBO); Pepsi, Where's My Jet? (Netflix); We Need to Talk About Cosby (Showtime)
Best Lead Performance in a New Scripted Series	Best Supporting Performance in a New Scripted Series
Quinta Brunson – Abbott Elementary as Janine Teagues (ABC): Aml Ameen – The Porter as Junior Massey (BET+ / CBC Television); Mo Amer – Mo as Mo Najjar (Netflix); Bridget Everett – Somebody Somewhere as Sam (HBO); KaMillion – Rap Shit as Mia Knight (HBO Max); Melanie Lynskey – Yellowjackets as Shauna Sadecki (Showtime); Himesh Patel – Station Eleven as Jeevan Chaudhary (HBO Max); Sue Ann Pien – As We See It as Violet Wu (Prime Video); Adam Scott – Severance as Mark Scout (Apple TV+); Ben Whishaw – This Is Going to Hurt as Adam Kay (AMC+ / BBC One)	Ayo Edebiri – The Bear as Sydney Adamu (FX on Hulu): Danielle Deadwyler – Station Eleven as Miranda Carroll (HBO Max); Jeff Hiller – Somebody Somewhere as Joel (HBO); Gbemisola Ikumelo – A League of Their Own as Clance Morgan (Prime Video); Janelle James – Abbott Elementary as Ava Coleman (ABC); Ebon Moss-Bachrach – The Bear as Richard "Richie" Jerimovich (FX on Hulu); Frankie Quiñones – This Fool as Luis (Hulu); Sheryl Lee Ralph – Abbott Elementary as Barbara Howard (ABC); Molly Shannon – I Love That for You as Jackie Stilton (Showtime); Tramell Tillman – Severance as Seth Milchick (Apple TV+)
Best Ensemble Cast in a New Scripted Series
Pachinko – Soji Arai, Jin Ha, Inji Jeong, Minha Kim, Kaho Minami, Lee Minho, Steve Sanghyun Noh, Anna Sawai, Jimmi Simpson, and Yuh-jung Youn

==== Series with multiple nominations and awards ====
Series that received multiple nominations
Nominations	Series
3	Abbott Elementary
3	The Bear
3	Severance
3	Station Eleven
2	The Porter
2	Somebody Somewhere

Series that won multiple awards
Wins	Series
2	The Bear

== Special awards ==
=== John Cassavetes Award ===
(The award is given to the best feature made for under $1,000,000; award given to the writer, director, and producer)

- The Cathedral – Ricky D'Ambrose (writer/director); Graham Swon (producer)
  - The African Desperate – Martine Syms (writer/director/producer); Rocket Caleshu (writer/producer); Vic Brooks (producer)
  - Holy Emy – Araceli Lemos (writer/director); Giulia Caruso (writer/producer); Mathieu Bompoint, Ki Jin Kim, and Konstantinos Vassilaros (producers)
  - A Love Song – Max Walker-Silverman (writer/director/producer); Jesse Hope and Dan Janvey (producers)
  - Something in the Dirt – Justin Benson (writer/director/producer); Aaron Moorhead (director/producer); David Lawson Jr. (producer)

=== Robert Altman Award ===
(The award is given to the film's director, casting director, and ensemble cast)

- Women Talking – Sarah Polley (director); John Buchan and Jason Knight (casting directors); Shayla Brown, Jessie Buckley, Claire Foy, Kira Guloien, Kate Hallett, Judith Ivey, Rooney Mara, Sheila McCarthy, Frances McDormand, Michelle McLeod, Liv McNeil, Ben Whishaw, and August Winter (cast)

== Emerging Filmmakers Awards ==
=== Producers Award ===
The award honors emerging producers who, despite highly limited resources, demonstrate the creativity, tenacity and vision required to produce quality, independent films.

- Tory Lenosky
  - Liz Cardenas
  - David Grove Churchill Viste

=== Someone to Watch Award ===
The award recognizes a filmmaker of singular vision who has not yet received appropriate recognition.

- Nikyatu Jusu – Nanny
  - Adamma Ebo – Honk for Jesus. Save Your Soul.
  - Araceli Lemos – Holy Emy

=== Truer than Fiction Award ===
The award is presented to an emerging director of non-fiction features who has not yet received significant recognition.

- Reid Davenport – I Didn't See You There
  - Isabel Castro – Mija
  - Rebeca Huntt – Beba

== See also ==
- 95th Academy Awards
- 80th Golden Globe Awards
- 76th British Academy Film Awards
- 43rd Golden Raspberry Awards
- 29th Screen Actors Guild Awards
- 28th Critics' Choice Awards
