= La Chamade (film) =

1968 film by Alain Cavalier

- Theatrical release poster
- Directed by: Alain Cavalier
- Screenplay by: Françoise Sagan; Alain Cavalier
- Based on: La Chamade by Françoise Sagan
- Produced by: Maria Rosaria
- Starring: Catherine Deneuve; Michel Piccoli; Roger Van Hool; Jacques Sereys; Philippine Pascal; Irène Tunc
- Cinematography: Pierre Lhomme
- Edited by: Pierre Gillette
- Music by: Maurice Le Roux
- Production companies: Les Films Ariane; Les Productions Artistes Associés; PEA
- Distributed by: Les Artistes Associés (France); PEA (Italy)
- Release dates: 30 October 1968 (France); March 1969 (Italy)
- Running time: 103 minutes
- Countries: France; Italy
- Language: French

La Chamade (also titled Heartbeat in English) is a 1968 romantic drama film directed by Alain Cavalier from a screenplay he co-wrote with Françoise Sagan, based on Sagan's 1965 novel. It stars Catherine Deneuve and Michel Piccoli, with Roger Van Hool, Jacques Sereys, Philippine Pascal and Irène Tunc. The film follows a young woman (Deneuve) who finds herself torn between her older, wealthy lover (Piccoli) and a working-class man her own age (Van Hool).

== Plot ==
In Paris, 25-year-old Lucile is the beautiful, carefree mistress of Charles, a wealthy, kind-hearted, middle-aged businessman. She refuses to work and enjoys a life of luxury and comfort thanks to Charles, but does not feel true love for him. When she meets Antoine, a charming but penniless young publisher's reader who is the lover of an older socialite named Diane, the two instantly fall in love and begin an affair, regularly spending the afternoons together at his one-room apartment. While Charles is on a business trip to New York City, Antoine suggests that Lucile move in with him, telling her that she must choose between him and Charles.

On the day of Charles's return, Lucile goes to wait for him at Orly Airport, while preparing to tell him that she is leaving him. Upon learning that his flight will be delayed, she worries that his plane may have crashed, but is relieved when he finally arrives. Unnerved by the thought of Charles dying, Lucile calls to tell Antoine that she has not yet broken up with Charles, upsetting Antoine. At the birthday party of Johnny, a mutual friend, Antoine makes a scene when Lucile refuses to dance with him, prompting him to leave. Antoine later ends his affair with Diane, while Lucile accompanies Charles to Saint-Tropez.

Upon learning from Johnny that Lucile is alone in Saint-Tropez and has been drinking excessively, Antoine promptly goes to meet her and they spend some time together at the seaside. Back in Paris, when Lucile breaks up with Charles, he grows agitated, declaring that he will always love her and predicting that Antoine will come to resent who she is, but she leaves with Antoine anyway. Lucile and Antoine are initially happy together, and he finds her a menial job in a publishing firm, but she quickly grows bored and quits the job after a month without informing Antoine. He eventually discovers her ruse and becomes angry but decides to let her have her way.

When Lucile becomes pregnant by Antoine, they plan to move into a larger apartment in a housing project. However, she later tells him that she has no desire to keep the baby and that Charles has agreed to fund her abortion at a Swiss clinic. Antoine is upset at first but ultimately agrees to accompany her to Geneva for the procedure. Some time later, Lucile accepts Charles's invitation to accompany him to a Mozart concert, and they spend the night together. The next morning, she goes to Antoine's apartment and finds him asleep. Tempted by the lure of her former life, Lucile calls Antoine from the café downstairs and ends their relationship before returning to Charles.

== Cast ==
- Catherine Deneuve as Lucile
- Michel Piccoli as Charles
- Roger Van Hool as Antoine
- Amidou as Etienne
- Philippine Pascal as Claire
- Jacques Sereys as Johnny
- Irène Tunc as Diane
- Jean-Pierre Castaldi as the man at Orly Airport (uncredited)

== Production ==
Principal photography took place from 17 April to 6 July 1968 in Paris, Nice, Saint-Tropez and at the Epinay Studios in Épinay-sur-Seine. La Chamade was one of four productions interrupted by the May 68 events in France.

== Reception ==
Upon its theatrical release, La Chamade received generally positive reviews. In his review in The New York Times, Vincent Canby wrote, "Cavalier may have created a practically perfect screen equivalent of the novelist's prose style." In addition to praising the performances by Deneuve and Piccoli, Canby wrote:

La Chamade (literally "the heartbeat") is a movie of technical skill and pure images that capture the textures of things—whitewashed walls, a piece of modern sculpture, cut flowers, flesh tanned in the sun—all of which give reality to a narrative line from which everything nonessential to the affairs of the heart has been refined. The extraordinary thing is that, in this day and age, it not only works but also seems somehow urgent, at least while it is going on.

Conversely, a Time reviewer compared La Chamade unfavourably to other two films starring Deneuve, Belle de Jour (1967) and The April Fools (1969), commenting that it "lacks the surrealistic pathology of Belle and the slick American romance of Fools." The reviewer nevertheless wrote, "To so shallow a role and so bland a story Deneuve brings, of course, her exquisite face and presence—eerily evocative of a warmer Grace Kelly."
