= The Origin of the World (film) =

- Directed by: Brady Corbet
- Written by: Brady Corbet
- Produced by: David Kaplan; Andrew Morrison; Brian Young
- Starring: Selena Gomez; Michael Fassbender; Cate Blanchett; Lily McInerny; Joe Alwyn; Taylor Russell; Amanda Seyfried
- Cinematography: Lol Crawley
- Production company: Kaplan Morrison
- Country: United States
- Language: English

The Origin of the World is an upcoming American epic period drama film written and directed by Brady Corbet. It stars Selena Gomez, Michael Fassbender, Cate Blanchett, Lily McInerny, Joe Alwyn, and Amanda Seyfried.

== Cast ==
- Selena Gomez
- Michael Fassbender
- Cate Blanchett
- Lily McInerny
- Joe Alwyn
- Taylor Russell
- Amanda Seyfried

== Production ==
In April 2026, it was reported that Brady Corbet's next feature film would be a period western drama film about the "American mysticism" and the occult history, with Selena Gomez starring. Corbet confirmed that the story spans from the 19th century to present day, predominantly focused in the 1970s. The script was 200 pages long, and the film was aiming for an NC-17 rating. In May, Michael Fassbender and Cate Blanchett joined the cast, the title was revealed to be The Origin of the World, and that the film would be shot in 8-perf 65 mm cameras. Sadie Soverall was in talks to join the cast. In July 2026, Joe Alwyn joined the cast. Taylor Russell and Amanda Seyfried also joined the cast.

Principal photography began on September 7, 2026, in South Africa, under the working title Salt Flats, with Lol Crawley as the cinematographer, and Lily McInerny joining the cast, replacing Soverall.

In September 2026, the production team shot at the sequoia grove of Cabezón de la Sal, Cantabria.
