= Lily McInerny =

American actress

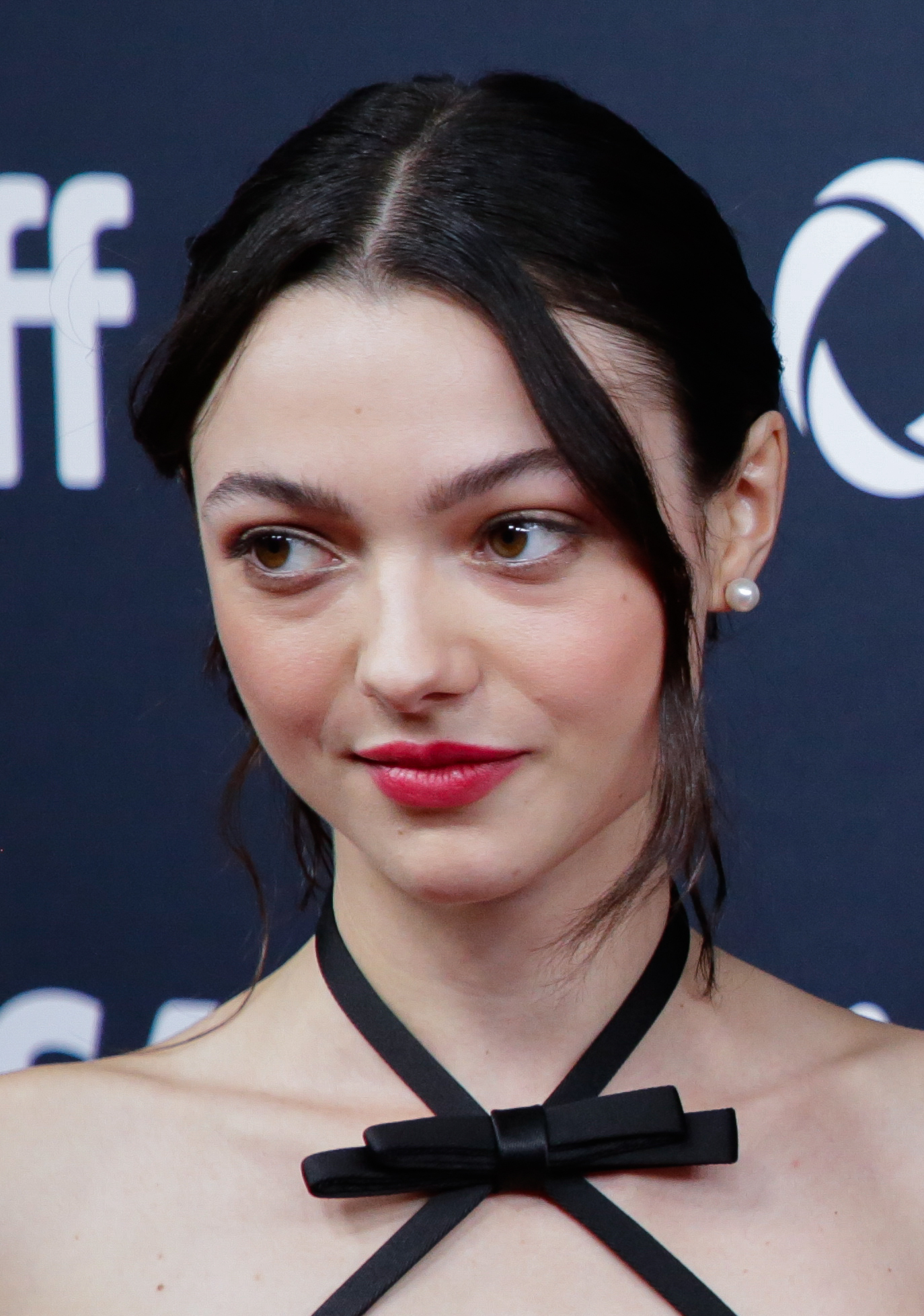
- McInerny at the 2024 Toronto International Film Festival
- Born: New York City, U.S.
- Education: Fiorello H. LaGuardia High School
- Occupation: Actress
- Years active: 2022–present
- Known for: Palm Trees and Power Lines

Lily McInerny is an American actress. She was nominated for Best Breakthrough Performance at the 2023 Film Independent Spirit Awards for her role in the 2022 film Palm Trees and Power Lines.

== Early life ==
Lily McInerny was born and raised in Greenwich Village, Manhattan. McInerny began acting at elementary school when she was eight years old. Aged thirteen, she successfully auditioned for Fiorello H. LaGuardia High School of Music & Art and Performing Arts. After high school she attended college in Vermont studying for a degree in performing arts.

== Career ==
In 2022, McInerny was seen in Palm Trees and Power Lines which premiered at the Sundance Film Festival and later saw her nominated for Best Breakthrough Performance at the 38th Independent Spirit Awards. She was nineteen years old when she first read for the part and early twenties when filming, playing the part of a seventeen-year-old. Prior to performing in the role she sought a therapist to help her with the emotional aspects of the storyline, and the pressure of her first professional role. She said that she “couldn’t have asked for a more special film to be my first”. McInerny was said by Rolling Stone to have “played to perfection” her role.

In November 2022 she made her New York stage debut in Bess Wohl written play Camp Siegfried, directed by David Cromer at Second Stage's Tony Kiser Theater. She also appeared as Macy in Hulu original series Tell Me Lies.

In 2023 she was cast in a contemporary adaptation of the 1958 Françoise Sagan novel Bonjour Tristesse, appearing alongside Claes Bang and Chloë Sevigny.

== Filmography ==
=== Film ===
Year	Title	Role	Notes
2022	Palm Trees and Power Lines	Lea	
2024	Bonjour Tristesse	Cécile	
2026	Magazine	Nora	
TBA	The Origin of the World	TBA	Filming

=== Television ===
Year	Title	Role	Notes
2022	Tell Me Lies	Macy	2 episodes

=== Theatre ===
Year	Title	Role	Venue	Notes
2022	Camp Siegfried	Her	Second Stage Theater	Off-Broadway
2024	The Animal Kingdom	Sofia	Connelly Theater	

== Awards ==
Awards	Year	Category	Nominated work	Result
Independent Spirit Award	2022	Best Breakthrough Performance	Palm Trees and Power Lines	Nominated
