= Aimez-vous Brahms? =

1959 novel by Françoise Sagan

- First UK edition (publ. John Murray)
- Author: Françoise Sagan
- Publication date: 1959

Aimez-vous Brahms? (Do you like Brahms?) is a novel by Françoise Sagan, first published in 1959. It was published in English in 1960 and was made into a film under the title Goodbye Again in 1961, starring Ingrid Bergman and Anthony Perkins. It was also adapted (probably unofficially) as a Hindi film called Jahan Tum Le Chalo in 1999.

== Summary ==
At thirty-nine years old, Paula is a divorced interior designer. Roger, her lover, who is busy with important business, makes distant visits to her, which she awaits with a certain indolence. She is committed to this relationship, but also wishes to preserve her independence and freedom.

At a turning point in her life, and ultimately dissatisfied, she meets Simon, the son of Mrs. Van Der Besh, a wealthy American customer. At 25 years of age, he is handsome, nonchalant, and childish. He falls passionately in love with Paula and she, though touched by his attentions, keeps her distance until the day he invites her to a Brahms concert given at the Salle Pleyel. Believing that she saw in him a being sensitive to music, she gives in and, for several weeks, accepts the passion that the young man offers her.

Paula soon realizes that her love for Roger is, despite everything, more precious to her. Confronted with society's disapproval of the age difference, she puts an end, not without sadness, to her relationship with Simon, envying him his violent and beautiful grief. However, she does not have the strength to burn bridges and sees the young man again, while establishing a more satisfying relationship with Roger.

== In popular culture ==
The title of the novel was cited in the 1960 film À bout de souffle when a young female journalist asks an intellectual poseur, "Aimez-vous Brahms?" He replies "Pas du tout!" (Not at all.)

The novel was adapted into a 1961 American-French film, titled Goodbye Again in the United States and Aimez-vous Brahms? in Europe. The film was directed by Anatole Litvak and starred Ingrid Bergman and Anthony Perkins.

In the music video for the new wave/ska band, The Beat's (The English Beat in USA and Canada) 1982 song, "Save It for Later," an intellectual snob character who has plugged his ears, sits at a table in the club and reads the paperback novel as the band plays on stage.

A 2020 South Korean television series entitled Do You Like Brahms? starred Park Eun-bin and Kim Min-jae. While the title appears to have been borrowed from that of Sagan's novel, the story bears little or no relationship to Sagan's story.
