= Dona Emma =

- Municipality
- Municipality of Dona Emma
- Flag Coat of arms

- Location in Brazil
- Coordinates: 26.985°S 49.7258°W
- Country: Brazil
- Region: South
- State: Santa Catarina
- Mesoregion: Vale do Itajai

Population (2020)
  - Total: 4,186
- Time zone: UTC -3

Dona Emma is a municipality in the state of Santa Catarina in the South region of Brazil.

== Notable people ==
- Hungarian born Alexander Lenard (medic, writer), who translated A. A. Milne's Winnie the Pooh into Latin, lived here.

== See also ==
- List of municipalities in Santa Catarina
