= Goodbye Again (1961 film) =

1961 film by Anatole Litvak

- Original film poster
- Directed by: Anatole Litvak
- Screenplay by: Samuel A. Taylor
- Based on: Aimez-vous Brahms? 1959 novel by Françoise Sagan
- Produced by: Anatole Litvak
- Starring: Ingrid Bergman; Anthony Perkins; Yves Montand; Jessie Royce Landis
- Cinematography: Armand Thirard
- Edited by: Bert Bates
- Music by: Georges Auric; Johannes Brahms
- Distributed by: United Artists
- Release date: June 29, 1961
- Running time: 120 minutes
- Countries: United States; France
- Language: English
- Box office: 2,387,793 admissions (France) $1.6 million (US rentals)

Goodbye Again (released in France as Aimez-vous Brahms?) is a 1961 romantic drama film produced and directed by Anatole Litvak. The screenplay was written by Samuel A. Taylor, based on the novel Aimez-vous Brahms? by Françoise Sagan. The film, released by United Artists, stars Ingrid Bergman, Anthony Perkins, Yves Montand, and Jessie Royce Landis.

== Plot ==
Paula Tessier, a 40-year-old Parisian interior designer, has been the mistress for five years of Roger Demarest, a philandering business executive. On the night of their anniversary, Roger postpones their date until the next day. After their date, Roger connects Paula with Mrs. Van de Besh, a wealthy client, who wants her apartment redecorated. The next morning, Paula meets Mrs. Van de Besh's 25-year-old son Philip, who works for an international law firm.

While driving her home, Philip falls in love with Paula. Later that night, Paula and Roger visit a nightclub. They are approached by Philip, who is drunk and mistakenly assumes Roger is Paula's husband. They leave the nightclub and Roger drives Philip back to his apartment.

The next morning, Philip apologizes to Paula for his drunken behavior, and they lunch at a restaurant. Philip becomes enamored of Paula, but she resists his advances. Elsewhere, Roger initiates another affair with one of his young mistresses, whom he calls his "Maisies". He cancels his weekend plans with Paula, claiming he is leaving on a business trip.

Paula is invited by Mrs. Van de Besh to a dinner party. She sees Philip there, who makes an advance towards her. He calls later to apologize and Paula accepts his invitation to a Brahms concert. After the concert, Philip questions her devotion to Roger. Later that night, Roger returns to Paula's apartment, where she deduces that Roger was with one of his other mistresses.

Paula receives a letter from Philip. He is leaving for London to work on a case; he says that even if she never wants to see him again, he will always love her.

In London, Philip receives Paula's letter and he rushes back to Paris. Meanwhile, Paula has finished renovating Mrs. Van de Besh's apartment. She and Roger attend her dinner party. Philip arrives unexpectedly. After the party, Philip follows Paula home, but she rushes inside when he kisses her.

Some time later, Roger leaves for another business trip, but he refuses to bring Paula along and tells her to not see Philip. Paula calls Philip at his office to tell him not to see her. Depressed, Philip waits outside Paula's apartment. When she eventually returns, she welcomes him inside.

Roger returns from his trip. While having dinner with him, Paula confesses her love for Philip and confronts Roger about his other mistresses. Roger excuses his affairs as normal, which upsets her.

Paula and Philip's friends and business associates disapprove of their relationship due to the age difference. Philip quits his job when asked to relocate to New York. Roger sees Paula again at a nightclub. A day later, they agree to be married. Upset at the news, Philip leaves Paula and goes to New York.

Paula waits for Roger to take her to dinner, but he phones her to cancel. Realizing that Roger will not change, Paula looks at herself in the mirror as she applies moisturizer to her face.

== Cast ==
- Ingrid Bergman as Paula Tessier
- Yves Montand as Roger Demarest
- Anthony Perkins as Philip Van der Besh
- Jessie Royce Landis as Mrs. Van der Besh
- Pierre Dux as Maitre Fleury
- Jackie Lane as First Maisie
- Jean Clarke as Second Maisie
- Michèle Mercier as Third Maisie
- Uta Taeger as Gaby
- André Randall as Mr. Steiner
- Peter Bull as Client
- Alison Leggatt as Alice
- David Horne as Queen's Counsel
- Diahann Carroll as Night Club Singer

Uncredited Cast

- Lee Patrick as Mme. Fleury
- Annie Duperoux as Madeline Fleury
- Raymond Gerome as Jimmy
- Jean Hebey as Mons. Cherel
- Michel Garland as Young Man in Club
- Colin Mann as Assistant Lawyer

The cast includes brief, uncredited cameo appearances by Yul Brynner and Jean-Pierre Cassel.

== Production ==
Litvak and others thought Aimez-vous Brahms? would be a confusing title for U.S. audiences, and initially chose Time on My Hands as the title for the American release, after the song of that name they had selected as the main theme. But when the song's publishers insisted on a $75,000 license for its use, Litvak dropped plans to use the song. The production team settled on Goodbye Again as the title, a suggestion from Perkins which he had taken from a Broadway production in which his father Osgood had had a role.

These two actors [Montand and Perkins] are wonderful for their parts. It's a long time since I worked with two actors I enjoyed so much. They are both charming, both great personalities and very different, and you understand why I—in my part as Paula—love them both.

— Letter written by Ingrid Bergman while on set

Scenes were filmed on location in Paris. During principal photography, Perkins thought Bergman was a "little too persistent" in her attempts to get him to rehearse their kissing scenes; Perkins later said "Bergman would have welcomed an affair with him."

But Bergman had a different explanation in her 1980 autobiography, saying it was her shyness and tendency to blush: "You see, although the camera has no terrors at all for me, I'm very bad at this sort of intimacy on the screen, especially when the men are practically strangers."

Uncredited "stars" of the film were the automobiles: as Time magazine pointed out, Goodbye Again "is thoroughly French. That is to say, all of its important scenes take place in restaurants or automobiles."

== Music ==
The score is by Georges Auric, with additional music by Brahms. The Brahms motifs are the 4th movement from Symphony No. 1 in C minor, Op. 68, and the 3rd Movement from Symphony No. 3 in F major, Op. 90. Film critic Bosley Crowther called the score "almost as elegant as the settings, which are the most respectable things in the film."

The soulful theme of the third movement of Brahms' Symphony No. 3 is heard repeatedly, including as the tune of a song ("Love Is Just a Word") sung by the night club singer (Diahann Carroll). Lyrics to the film are by Dory Langdon (later known as Dory Previn).

The soundtrack was released by United Artists Records (UAS 5091) in "electronic" (i.e., simulated) stereo.

== Reception ==
The film "found success in Europe, where Perkins won an award at the Cannes Film Festival for his performance, but in America critics and audiences were generally unenthusiastic." According to Bosley Crowther, "Taylor's derivative screen play has a few flights of fancy and wit, but on the whole it is solemn and pedestrian"; "Perkins not only has the most engaging role but he also plays it in the most engaging fashion and almost carries the picture by himself." Years later, Andrea Foshee, writing for Turner Classic Movies, agreed:

Co-star Anthony Perkins was just coming off his smash 1960 success as Norman Bates in Alfred Hitchcock's Psycho, a role that would typecast him for the rest of his career. Yet, as the charming, aimless Philip in Goodbye Again, Perkins clearly demonstrates his versatility as an actor in a role that couldn't be further removed from his turn as a cross-dressing schizophrenic killer.

Perkins won the Best Actor Award at the 1961 Cannes Film Festival and Anatole Litvak was nominated for the Palme d'Or.

It was the 25th most popular movie of the year in France.

Stanley Kauffmann of The New Republic described Goodbye Again as a "syrupy saga."

== See also ==
- List of American films of 1961
