= Anne Green =

American novelist and translator who lived in France

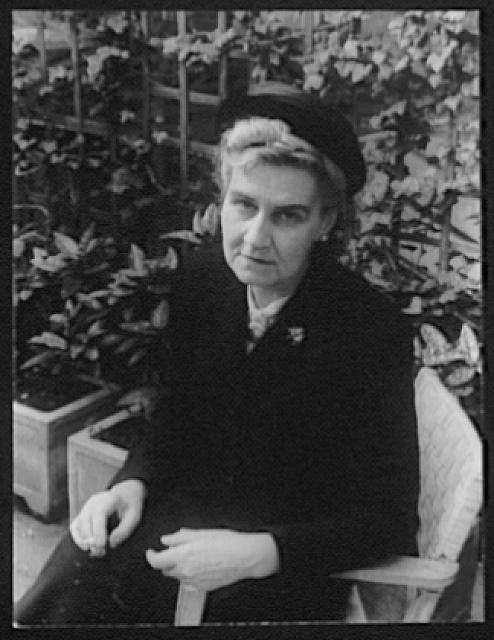
Portrait of Anne Green by Carl Van Vechten.

Anne Green (born 11 November 1891, Savannah, Georgia, died 30 December 1979, Draveil, Essonne) was an American writer and translator, the sister of Julien Green. While a child, Green's parents moved to France, where her father, ruined by a financial crisis and poor investments, came to settle. The family lived for a few years in Le Havre before moving to Paris, where her brother Julien was born. She and her brother both participated in World War I, in which she volunteered as an ambulance driver.

Her best known work is With Much Love (1948), a fictionalized account of her childhood. She wrote fifteen novels in English and nine volumes of fiction in French. She also translated fiction and non-fiction from English to French and from French to English, sometimes in collaboration with her brother.

== Works ==
=== Author ===
==== Anglophone phase ====
- The Selbys, Dutton, 1930
- Reader, I Married Him, Dutton, 1931
- Marietta, Dutton, 1932
- A Marriage of Convenience, Dutton, 1933
- Fools Rush In, Dutton, 1934
- That Fellow Perceval, Dutton, 1935
- Winchester House, Dutton, 1936
- 16 Rue Cortambert, Dutton, 1937
- Paris, Dutton, 1938
- The Silent Duchess, Harper, 1939
- The Delamer Curse, Harper, 1940
- The Lady in the Mask, Harper, 1942
- Just before Dawn, Harper, 1943
- The Old Lady, Harper, 1947
- With Much Love, memoir, Harper, 1948
  French translation by Marie Canavaggia: Mes jours évanouis, Plon, 1951, reissued Le Livre de Poche, 1974 — literally My Vanished Days

==== Francophone phase ====
The publication of Green's memoir and homage to her mother, With Much Love, marked something of a turning point, with all her subsequent work written and published in French.

- Le Goret, short stories, Plon, 1954, reissued Le Livre de Poche, 1977
- Adeline, Corrêa, 1954
- La Lanterne magique, written with Didier Mesnil, Émile-Paul, 1956
- Le Vestiaire des anges, Denoël, 1958
- L'Or et l'Argent, Stock, 1962
- La Fille du grand marais, Albin Michel, 1964
- La Bonne Aventure, Albin Michel, 1966
- Corinne et le prince persan, Albin Michel, 1967
- La Porte des songes, Plon, 1969

=== Screenwriter ===
- Her Sister's Secret, American film, 1946
- Orient Express, British television series, 1953–1954
  Two episodes: The Red Sash (1953) and European Edition (1953)
- The Adventures of Robin Hood, British television series, 1955–1959
  Eight episodes under the name of Anne Rodney: Maid Marian (1955), Checkmate (1955), The Inquisitor (1956), Tables Turned (1956), The Prisoner (1956), Hubert (1957), The Dream (1957), and The Shell Game (1957); some of Green's work appeared in the trilogy of colorized movie-length recuts released in 1991 to capitalize on the success of Robin Hood: Prince of Thieves

=== Translator ===
- Georges Bernanos, A Crime (1936) — a translation of Un crime (1935)
- Robert de Saint Jean, France Speaking (1941) — a translation of Démocratie, beurre et canons (1941)
- Charles Péguy, Basic Verities: Prose and Poetry, translated with Julien Green (1943) — a translation of selected works
- Charles Péguy, Men and Saints: Prose and Poetry, translated with Julien Green (1944) — a translation of selected works
- Theodora Keogh, Meg et le lion (1950) — a translation of Meg (1950)
- William Saroyan, Contes (1953) — a translation of selected short stories
- Françoise Sagan, A Certain Smile (1956) — a translation of Un certain sourire (1955)
- Christine Arnothy, God Is Late (1957) — a translation of Dieu est en retard (1955)
- Julien Green, The Transgressor (1957) — a translation of Le Malfaiteur (1956)
- Mary Norton, Les Chapardeurs (1957) — a translation of The Borrowers (1952)
- Julien Green, Each in His Darkness (1961), reissued as Each Man in His Darkness (1990) — a translation of Chaque homme dans sa nuit (1960)
- Françoise Sagan, Wonderful Clouds (1961) — a translation of Les Merveilleux Nuages (1961)
- Julien Green, Diary, 1928–1957 (1964) — a translation of selections from Green's Journal
- Julien Green, To Leave Before Dawn (1967), reissued as The Green Paradise: 1900–1916 (1993) — a translation of Partir avant le jour (1963)
