= Cajarc =

- Commune
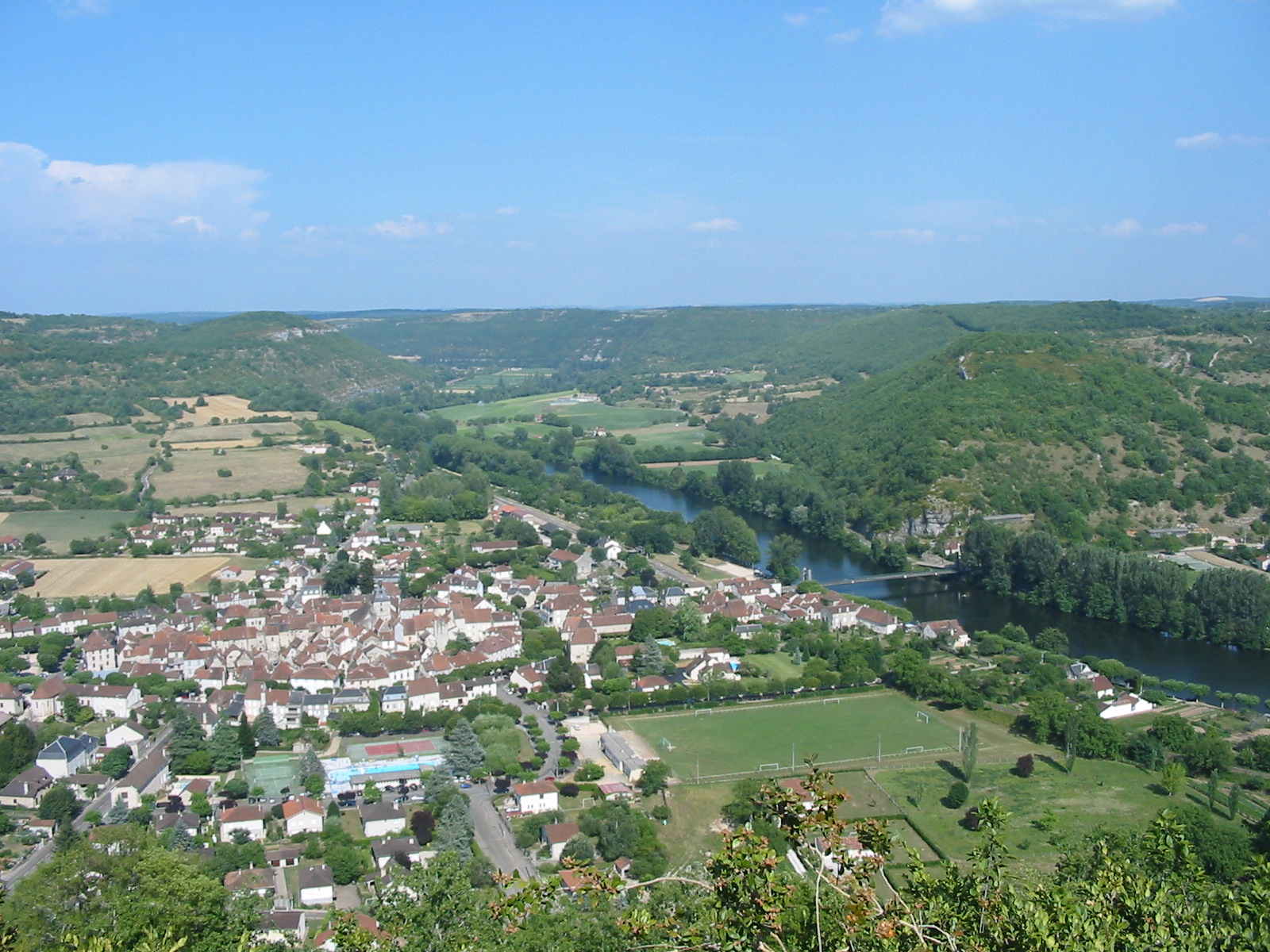
- Lot River at Cajarc

- Coat of arms
- Location of Cajarc
- Location within France Location within Occitanie
- Coordinates: 44°29′11″N 1°50′37″E
- Country: France
- Region: Occitania
- Department: Lot
- Arrondissement: Figeac
- Canton: Causse et Vallées
- Intercommunality: Grand-Figeac

Government
  - Mayor (2020–2026): Jacques Viratelle
- Area^{1}: 25.1 km^{2} (9.7 sq mi)
- Elevation: 160 m (520 ft)
- Highest elevation: 394 m (1,293 ft)
- Lowest elevation: 140 m (460 ft)
- Population (2023): 1,136
  - Density: 45.3/km^{2} (117/sq mi)
- Time zone: UTC+01:00 (CET)
  - Summer (DST): UTC+02:00 (CEST)
- INSEE/Postal code: 46045 /46160
- ^{1} French Land Register data, which excludes lakes, ponds, glaciers > 1 km^{2} (0.386 sq mi or 247 acres) and river estuaries.

Cajarc (French pronunciation: [kaʒaʁ]) is a commune in the Lot department, Occitania, France.

It is a stopping place on the Via podiensis, the medieval pilgrimage route from Le Puy-en-Velay to Santiago de Compostela, but also attracts tourists on account of its medieval town centre, its plan d'eau, a 4 km-long dammed section of the river Lot, and its beautiful setting in the Lot valley and the surrounding limestone plains (le causse). Its major cultural event is Africajarc, a four-day festival of contemporary African music and culture which runs in the last week of July each year; in 2008 it celebrated its tenth anniversary.

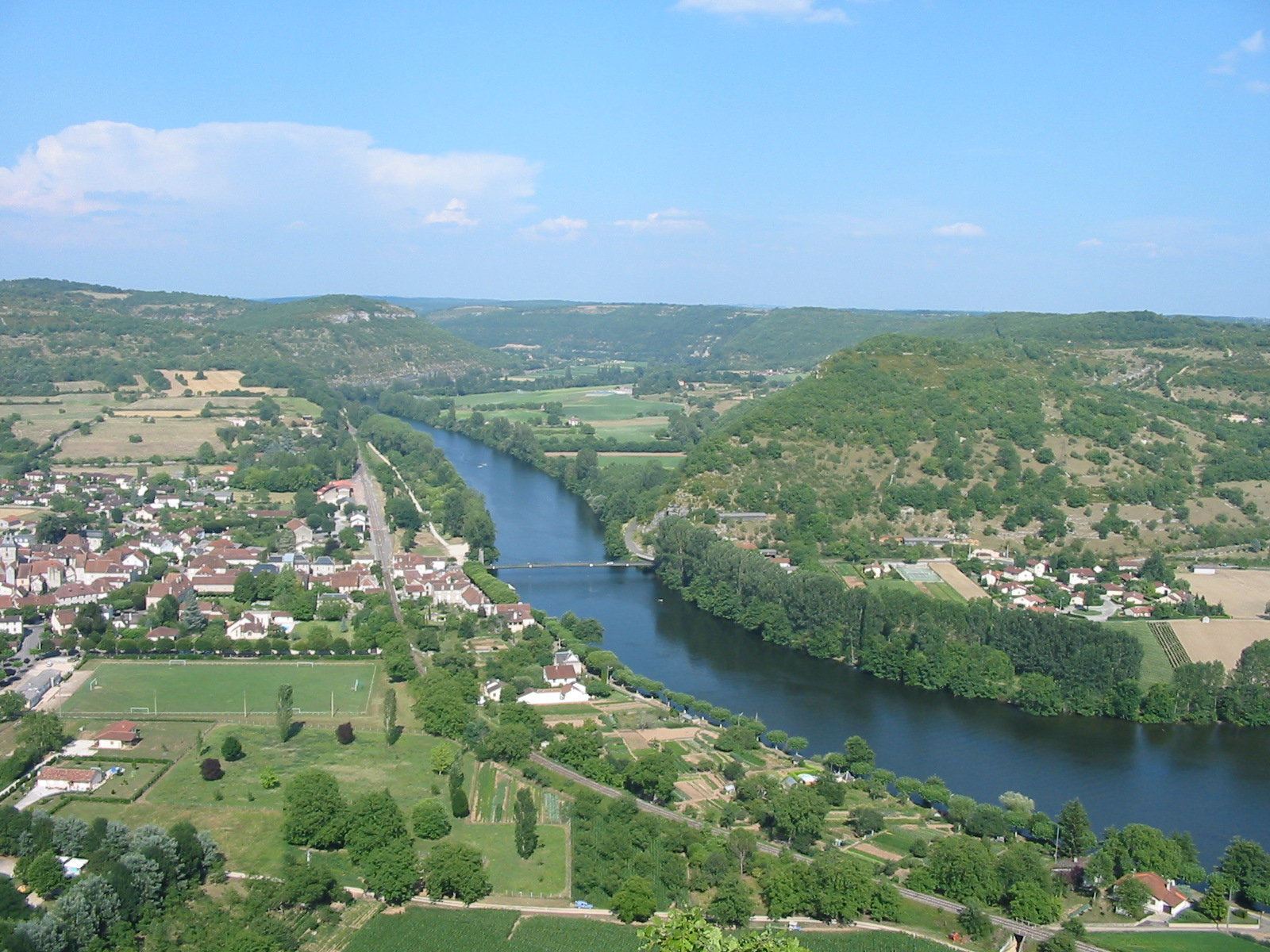
View from Cajarc

== Notable people ==
Cajarc was the birthplace of playwright, novelist and screenwriter Françoise Sagan (1935–2004) born Françoise Quoirez.

President of France Georges Pompidou was an MP for the area in the National Assembly.

== See also ==
- Communes of the Lot department

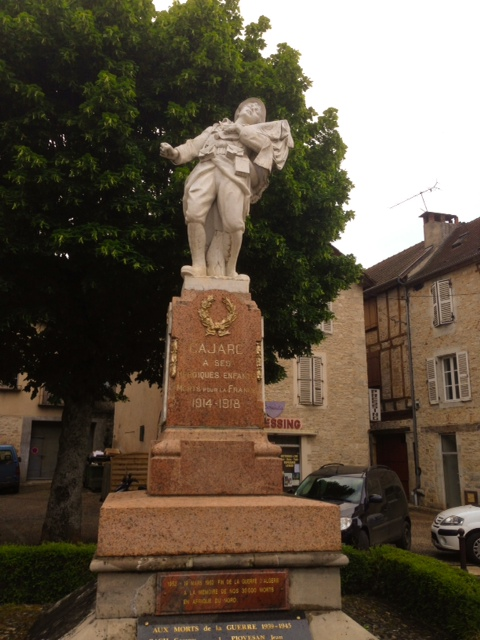
Monument to the dead
