= Palm Trees and Power Lines (film) =

2022 film by Jamie Dack

- Release poster
- Directed by: Jamie Dack
- Screenplay by: Jamie Dack; Audrey Findlay
- Story by: Jamie Dack
- Based on: Palm Trees and Power Lines by Jamie Dack
- Produced by: Leah Chen Baker; Jamie Dack
- Starring: Lily McInerny; Jonathan Tucker; Gretchen Mol
- Cinematography: Chananun Chotrungroj
- Edited by: Christopher Radcliff
- Production companies: Fiesta Island Films; Neon Heart Productions
- Distributed by: Momentum Pictures
- Release dates: January 24, 2022 (Sundance); March 3, 2023 (United States)
- Running time: 110 minutes
- Country: United States
- Language: English

Palm Trees and Power Lines is a 2022 American coming-of-age drama film directed by Jamie Dack in her feature directorial debut, based on her 2018 short film of the same name. The screenplay by Dack and Audrey Findlay is from a story by Dack. The film stars Lily McInerny as a disconnected teenage girl falling into a relationship with a man (Jonathan Tucker) twice her age.

The film had its world premiere at the 38th Sundance Film Festival on January 24, 2022, where Dack won the U.S. Dramatic Competition Directing Award. It was released in select theaters in the United States and on VOD on March 3, 2023, by Momentum Pictures. The film received positive reviews from critics and earned four nominations at the 38th Independent Spirit Awards, including Best First Feature.

== Plot ==
Lea is a 17-year-old girl spending the last few weeks of her summer hanging out with her best friend Amber. She lives in suburban Southern California with her emotionally absent single mother, Sandra. Lea's father is not present in her life and lives in Arizona with his new family. Lea and Amber hang out with boys their age, and Lea has a casual relationship with one of them, Jared. However, Jared only values Lea for sex and their hookups are not satisfying for her.

One night, as the group of friends eat at a diner, Lea makes eye contact with an older guy sitting at another table who winks at her on his way out. Lea's friends run out on the bill, but Lea is left behind when she hesitates to follow them. When she does try running out, a cook accosts her, but the same man from earlier intervenes and Lea is able to get away. As she walks home, the older man drives his truck alongside her and coaxes her into getting in and giving her a ride home. He introduces himself as Tom and tells Lea he is 34 years old, while Lea shares her age. Before she departs, he adds his mobile number into her cell phone.

Lea is charmed by Tom and confides to Amber that she has met someone, but doesn't disclose the details and says the guy is a boy at another school. Lea's relationship with her mom becomes further strained when she welcomes an ex-boyfriend back into their house. Lea turns to Tom for attention and validation, and he acts sympathetically to her problems, telling her that he too does not have a close relationship with his parents. When Lea asks Tom what he does for a living, he vaguely responds that he runs his own small business doing home repairs and remodeling, a job that grants him complete freedom.

Lea soon enters into a romantic relationship with Tom. When she agrees to spend the night with him, he takes her to a motel, reasoning he is temporarily staying there until he finds a new place. Lea senses something is wrong when Tom must leave the room to attend to a domestic dispute upstairs, but he insists to Lea that he was just helping out a female neighbor with her drunk boyfriend. On a day out with Tom at the beach, Lea is spotted by a friend from school, and Tom introduces himself to her. Word gets back to Amber, and Lea makes her promise not to tell anyone about their relationship. Tom also asks Lea not to see other guys, telling her affectionately, "You're mine". Lea appreciates feeling wanted and desired.

Lea and Tom are at a restaurant one day and the waitress suspects Lea is in a coercive relationship. When Tom steps outside to take a phone call, the waitress covertly tells Lea that if she needs to get away, she can help her. Confused and unaware that she is being groomed by Tom, Lea asks why she would need help, and the waitress mentions that Tom frequents the eatery with other young girls. When Tom returns, he can sense Lea's unease and gets her to talk about what's troubling her. When she confesses the waitress said she's seen him before with other girls, he plays it off and claims she must have him mistaken with someone else.

Later, while Lea is out drinking and smoking with friends, Jared mockingly jokes she has been seen "hanging out with the geriatric". Lea, angry that Amber is the one who told Jared, storms off and shows up distraught at Tom's motel room. Tom comforts Lea by telling her he loves her and reassuring her that her friends and family's opinions don't matter. He also gifts her a bracelet inscribed with an inside joke they share. When he asks if she wants to go on a vacation with him, Lea agrees without hesitation and the two head to a hotel. On their second night at the hotel, Tom sits Lea down and asks her if she can do something for him. He says she needs to sleep with another man for money, and if she loves him she'll do it for him. Having coerced her into prostitution, he leaves her with a middle-aged man. The unnamed man coaxes a reluctant Lea into oral and vaginal sex. While the man is in the shower, an emotional Lea packs her things and leaves the room, but Tom catches her in an embrace before she can leave the hotel.

Tom takes her to get food at a restaurant, and Lea uses an excuse to go to the restroom as an opportunity to leave, walking to a nearby gas station by herself. She tearfully calls Amber to come pick her up, and when she arrives the two reconcile. At home, Lea makes an effort to spend more time with her mother and returns to her usual activities with Amber. After Amber compliments Lea's bracelet, she feels compelled to try and phone Tom several times, but his mobile number is disconnected. She goes to the motel and knocks on his door, but it goes unanswered. She inquires about Tom's whereabouts from an upstairs tenant she had seen Tom helping out before, and the girl reluctantly dials his number and puts her through to Tom. Lea sobs into the phone and asks why Tom abandoned her. The film ends with Lea's affirmations of her feelings for Tom and she smiles hearing him reciprocate his love for her.

== Cast ==
- Lily McInerny as Lea
- Jonathan Tucker as Tom
- Gretchen Mol as Sandra
- Auden Thornton as Katie
- Quinn Frankel as Amber
- Timothy Taratchila as Jared
- Armani Jackson as Patrick
- Kenny Johnston as Jimmy

== Production ==
Jamie Dack's short film of the same name premiered at the Cannes Film Festival as a Cinéfondatio selection in 2018. Dack said she was inspired to revisit the story and further explore themes of manipulation and consent due to a personal connection to the material and the MeToo movement, saying, "I was thinking a lot about some relationships I had when I was younger, and how, when I was in them I thought that I was in control of them and consciously choosing them for myself. But now that I am an adult, when I look back on them, I realize that that wasn’t necessarily the case. I wanted to write this character who kind of serves as a proxy for my younger self, which allowed me to explore what had happened to me, but also what could have happened to me." The script, which was written by Dack and Audrey Findlay, was constructed to show the different stages of grooming, including "targeting a victim, gaining their trust, filling a need, isolating them, and then whatever the abuse ends up being."

The short and the feature were inspired from a series of 35-millimeter film photographs that Dack took in her native Southern California. The title refers to the "suburban malaise that [Lea’s] experiencing…[which] is one of the things that cause her to be vulnerable to [Tom’s] manipulation".

The film was shot over 25 days in the Los Angeles area in 2021. Beach scenes were filmed in Malibu and San Diego.

== Release ==
The film premiered at the Sundance Film Festival on January 24, 2022, where it won the U.S. directing award. It also screened at the San Francisco International Film Festival, the Melbourne International Film Festival, the Deauville Film Festival, the Filmfest Hamburg, the London Film Festival, the Busan International Film Festival, the São Paulo International Film Festival, the Valladolid International Film Festival, the Thessaloniki International Film Festival, the Tallinn Black Nights Film Festival, the Stockholm International Film Festival and the Torino Film Festival.

In November 2022, Momentum Pictures acquired US and UK distribution rights to Palm Trees and Power Lines, with a limited theatrical and VOD release on March 3, 2023.

== Reception ==
=== Critical response ===
On the review aggregator website Rotten Tomatoes, the film holds an approval rating of 90% based on 77 reviews, with an average score of 7.6/10. The website's critics consensus reads, "Palm Trees and Power Lines tells a difficult story with searing skill – and marks Lily McInerny as a young actor with brilliant potential." On Metacritic, which uses a weighted average, the film has a score of 73 out of 100 based on 20 critic reviews, indicating "generally favorable" reviews.

K. Austin Collins of Rolling Stone commented "This is a movie operating on the principle that the most routine form of this violence isn't sensational, but subtle." Writing for RogerEbert.com, Brian Tallerico called the film "a character study that’s anchored by a moving breakthrough performance from Lily McInerny, and one that ably supports and balances it from Jonathan Tucker." Tomris Laffly of Harper's Bazaar wrote the film "goes somewhere even darker than Andrea Arnold's Fish Tank, with a brave query into the notion of consent and a gut-wrenching parting note that feels like a scream stuck in one's throat."

Roxana Hadadi of Vulture wrote, "Tucker's performance here is so mesmerizingly disquieting", and he uses "the ability to temper the predatory glint in his eye with soft-spoken sensitivity" to "tremendously unsettling effect". Hadadi added the film "doesn't deviate from where you predict it will go", but concluded "the relationship McInerny and Tucker build is so convincing in its mixture of exploitation and yearning that Palm Trees and Power Lines capably secures what Lea desires most too: your attention."

While some critics said the film felt "frustratingly underdeveloped", Richard Brody of The New Yorker conceded, "the revelation of [Tom's true intent], when it arrives, is a shock nonetheless, to Lea and to viewers...[becoming] clear in a powerful, agonizing scene that Dack films with a supreme inspiration of empathy and understanding distilled into a single, fixed-frame, five-minute-plus shot, during which the anguish of anticipation yields to terror and revulsion."

=== Accolades ===
Award	Date of ceremony	Category	Recipient(s)	Result	Ref.
Sundance Film Festival	January 28, 2022	Grand Jury Prize Dramatic	Palm Trees and Power Lines	Nominated	
Sundance Film Festival	January 28, 2022	Best Director	Jamie Dack	Won	
San Francisco International Film Festival	April 30, 2022	New Directors Award	Jamie Dack	Nominated	
Deauville American Film Festival	September 10, 2022	Grand Prize	Jamie Dack	Nominated	
Deauville American Film Festival	September 10, 2022	Jury Prize	Jamie Dack	Won	
Torino Film Festival	December 3, 2022	Best Feature Film	Jamie Dack	Won	
Torino Film Festival	December 3, 2022	Best Screenplay	Jamie Dack and Audrey Findlay	Won	
Independent Spirit Awards	March 4, 2023	Best First Feature	Jamie Dack and Leah Chen Baker	Nominated	
Independent Spirit Awards	March 4, 2023	Best First Screenplay	Jamie Dack and Audrey Findlay	Nominated	
Independent Spirit Awards	March 4, 2023	Best Breakthrough Performance	Lily McInerny	Nominated	
Independent Spirit Awards	March 4, 2023	Best Supporting Performance	Jonathan Tucker	Nominated	
