= La Chamade =

1965 novel by Françoise Sagan

- First US edition
- Author: Françoise Sagan
- Original title: La Chamade
- Language: French
- Publisher: Julliard (France); E. P. Dutton (US)
- Publication date: 1965
- Publication place: France
- English publication date: 1966
- Media type: Print (Hardback & Paperback)

La Chamade is a 1965 novel by French playwright and novelist Françoise Sagan.

It was adapted into a 1968 movie starring Catherine Deneuve and Michel Piccoli.

== Plot summary ==
Like many of Sagan's novels, this is a story of lost love. A couple meet and move in together, but the woman cannot get used to his life, his working-class existence. She leaves her lover to return to her affair with a man of means.

Ostensibly, she is rejecting her lover because she feels stifled by his position in society. But the class differences are metaphor for the quality of the love, with a woman deciding to be with a man who loves her for who she is rather than as an object of affection, merely the focus of a selfish love. She wants to be with the one who doesn't ask her to change.
