= The Woman Next Door (1981 film) =

1981 film by François Truffaut

- Theatrical release poster
- French: La Femme d'à côté
- Directed by: François Truffaut
- Written by: François Truffaut; Suzanne Schiffman; Jean Aurel
- Produced by: Armand Barbault; François Truffaut
- Starring: Gérard Depardieu; Fanny Ardant; Henri Garcin; Michèle Baumgartner; Roger Van Hool; Véronique Silver
- Cinematography: William Lubtchansky
- Edited by: Martine Barraqué
- Music by: Georges Delerue
- Production companies: Les Films du Carrosse; TF1 Films Production
- Distributed by: Gaumont Distribution
- Release date: 30 September 1981 (France)
- Running time: 106 minutes
- Country: France
- Language: French
- Box office: 1,101,537 admissions (France)

The Woman Next Door (French: La Femme d'à côté) is a 1981 French romantic drama film directed by François Truffaut. Reminiscent of the medieval legend of Tristan and Iseult but set among young middle-class people in a provincial city, it tells the story of a fatal romance between a loving husband (Gérard Depardieu) and the attractive woman (Fanny Ardant) who moves in next door. Truffaut's penultimate film, being followed by the more light-hearted Vivement dimanche!, it was the 39th highest-grossing film of the year, with a total of 1,087,600 admissions in France.

== Plot ==
Bernard lives happily with his wife Arlette and young son Thomas in a village outside Grenoble. One day a married couple, Philippe and Mathilde, move into the house next door. Bernard and Mathilde are shocked at meeting each other because years before, when both single, they had a stormy affair that ended painfully. At first Bernard avoids Mathilde, until a chance meeting in a supermarket reawakens long-buried passions and soon, while openly good neighbours, in secret they pursue an affair. Though both find the strain of living their normal family and working lives unbearable, it is Bernard who cracks first. After publicly revealing his violent passion for Mathilde at a garden party, he keeps away from her and the two households try to get on with their lives. But the rejected Mathilde then cracks and, after publicly collapsing at the tennis club, is hospitalised with depression. When she is released, she finds that to get far away from Bernard her husband has moved them out of the village. One night Bernard is woken by a banging shutter on the empty house next door and gets up to investigate. In the house, he spots Mathilde in the darkness. After they have had sex on the bare floor, taking a gun out of her handbag she shoots first him and then herself.

== Cast ==
- Gérard Depardieu as Bernard Coudray
- Fanny Ardant as Mathilde Bauchard
- Henri Garcin as Philippe Bauchard
- Michèle Baumgartner as Arlette Coudray
- Roger Van Hool as Roland Duguet
- Véronique Silver as Madame Odile Jouve
- Philippe Morier-Genoud as doctor
- Olivier Becquaert as Thomas Coudray

== Reception ==
On review aggregator website Rotten Tomatoes, the film holds an approval rating of 85% based on 13 reviews, with an average rating of 7.8/10.
