= A Certain Smile =

1956 novel by Françoise Sagan

- First US edition
- Author: Françoise Sagan
- Original title: Un Certain Sourire
- Translator: Anne Green
- Cover artist: Catherine Denvir
- Language: French
- Genre: Romance novel
- Publisher: E. P. Dutton (US)
- Publication place: France
- English publication date: 1956; 70 years ago
- Preceded by: Bonjour Tristesse
- Followed by: Dans un mois, dans un an

A Certain Smile was originally published in French as Un certain sourire by the Paris publisher Juillard in 1956. It was the second novel by Françoise Sagan and was written in two months. Two translations into English then followed in 1956. That by Anne Green was published by E.P. Dutton in New York and that by Irene Ash was published by John Murray in London, followed in the same year by a Penguin Books paperback edition. The story is related by a Parisian student who has an experimental love affair with a much older man.

== Plot ==
Dominique is a sophisticated twenty-year-old law student at the Sorbonne in mid-1950s Paris who is introduced by her lover Bertrand to his uncle and aunt, the worldly businessman Luc and his wife Françoise. Both Luc and Dominique are aware of their mutual attraction from the beginning, but Dominique holds off for fear of hurting both Bertrand and Françoise. The latter has become close to Dominique, relating to her almost as a mother, buying her presents and using the familiar form tu with her.

Tiring of Bertrand, Dominique eventually decides on the experiment of accepting Luc's desire to make love to her and spends two weeks with him in a luxurious hotel in Cannes. Though she had promised herself not to fall in love with Luc, after their sexual separation and return to Paris, Dominique becomes obsessed with the memory of their past happiness and appeals to Luc not to end the affair. But for Luc their relationship had simply been a pleasant adventure and he can only pity Dominique's inexperience.

Meanwhile Catherine, a fellow student, has told Bertrand of Dominique's affair and he informs Dominique that he is not prepared to share her affections. Then Pierre, a family friend who had caught sight of Luc and Dominique together in Cannes, tells Françoise about it out of jealousy, breaking up their friendship. But after some months of misery, while Luc is away in the US on business, Dominique is reconciled with Françoise and accepts the transience of her sexual relationship. "But what of it?" she concludes, "I was a woman, I had loved a man. It was a simple story; there was nothing to make a fuss about." For the future she has the accepting friendship of Alain, another student she has met recently, who is more her intellectual equal.

== Background ==
Sagan's novella reflects its author and the time when it was written. It is "studiedly young" and makes its appeal to a young readership under the thrall of the contemporary climate of existentialism (to which reference is made in the course of the story) and its moral ambivalence. Another study notes that the novel's appearance was followed by the even greater challenge to conventional morality in the film Et Dieu créa la femme, embodied in its star Brigitte Bardot. The book's amoral stance is that of the well-off middle class to which its author belonged, as conveyed through her deceptively simple narrative style. Thus it appeared in French intellectual terms, while the review in Time stated less sympathetically that "Sagan's prose is as disciplined as her characters are not... her novel is a petition in spiritual and emotional bankruptcy."

== Interpretations ==
The novel's style was satirised by Jean Kerr in Harper's Bazaar in a 1956 parody titled "Toujours Tristesse." The short piece takes its beginning "After reading A Certain Smile by Françoise Sagan" and makes fun of the book's mood of melancholy boredom and amorality. The parody also later appeared in Kerr's 1957 collection of essays, Please Don't Eat the Daisies.

In 1958 there was a US film adaptation of Sagan's novel but it was only allowed to be made after substantial changes to the story. Sagan disapproved of it publicly, and even its director Jean Negulesco has admitted that there is "not much of Sagan" in the film.
