= Bonjour Tristesse =

1954 novel by Françoise Sagan

- First English edition cover
- Author: Françoise Sagan
- Language: French
- Publisher: Éditions Julliard (France); John Murray (UK)
- Publication date: 1954
- Publication place: France
- English publication date: 1955

Bonjour Tristesse (English: "Hello Sadness") is a novel by Françoise Sagan. Published in 1954, when the author was only 18, it was an overnight sensation. The title is derived from a poem by Paul Éluard, "À peine défigurée", which begins with the lines "Adieu tristesse/Bonjour tristesse..." An English-language film adaptation was released in 1958, directed by Otto Preminger.

== Plot summary ==
Seventeen-year-old Cécile spends her summer in a villa on the French Riviera with her father Raymond and his current mistress, the young, superficial, fashionable Elsa, who gets on well with Cécile. Raymond is an attractive, worldly, amoral man who excuses his serial philandering by quoting Oscar Wilde: "Sin is the only note of vivid colour that persists in the modern world." Cécile says, "I believed that I could base my life on it", and accepts their languorous lifestyle as the ideal of privileged status. One of its advantages for Cécile is that her father, who has no intellectual interests, does not care if she studies or not. Another is that he gives her leeway to pursue her own interests, with the assumption that she will be an amusing addition to the superficial social gatherings he favors. In the next villa to theirs is a young man in his 20s, Cyril, with whom Cécile has her first sexual romance.

Their peaceful holiday is shattered by the arrival of Anne, whom Raymond had vaguely invited. A cultured, principled, intelligent, hard-working woman of Raymond's age who was a friend of his late wife, Anne regards herself as a sort of godmother to Cécile. The three women all have claims on Raymond's attention; the remote, enigmatic Anne soon becomes Raymond's lover, and the next morning she announces their engagement. Elsa moves out, then Anne tries to take over parenting Cécile. Raymond starts to take Anne's side in many arguments and fails to stand up for Cécile which angers her more. Anne tells Cécile to stop seeing Cyril and get back to her schoolbooks. Cécile is horrified at this threat to her pampered life as her father's darling, especially as Anne becomes the entire focus of Raymond's interest. She devises a plan to prevent the marriage, while nevertheless feeling ambiguous about her scheming.

To make Raymond jealous, Cécile arranges for Elsa and Cyril to pretend to be a couple and appear together at specific moments. When Raymond predictably becomes jealous of the younger Cyril, he renews his pursuit of Elsa. But Cécile has misjudged Anne's sensitivity. After she sees Raymond and Elsa together in the woods, with Raymond brushing pine needles off of his suit, Anne drives off in tears and her car plunges from a cliff in an apparent suicide.

Cécile and her father return to the empty, desultory life they were living before Anne interrupted their summer and consider the impact Anne has had on their lives. Cécile lives with the knowledge that her manipulations led to Anne's death and longs for the summer they shared.

== Characters ==
- Cécile, a wealthy and careless seventeen-year-old girl
- Raymond, her middle-aged father, a notorious partier and ladies' man
- Elsa, Raymond's latest mistress at the beginning of the novel
- Anne, an old friend of Cécile's mother, who mentored Cécile after she withdrew from Catholic boarding school
- Cyril, a young man who lives near the house Raymond rents for the summer

== Reception ==
An early brief review of Irene Ash's English translation (John Murray, 1955), in The Times of 19 May 1955, describes it as "An unusual little fiction ... written by a 19-year-old girl from the Dordogne ... a nice piece of precocity". The reviewer in The Spectator of the same date said "Bonjour, Tristesse, which has achieved remarkable celebrity by virtue of its subject-matter and its authoress's age, is a vulgar, sad little book".

== Translations into English ==
Bonjour Tristesse was translated into English by Irene Ash in 1955. Ash's translation censors much of the amoral and sexual themes of the original text, removing over 100 lines of Sagan's original writing to make it more palatable for contemporary British publication. A 2013 translation by Heather Lloyd includes the full uncensored text.

== Cultural adaptations ==
- German-American filmmaker Otto Preminger produced and directed a film adaptation of the book through his film production company Wheel Productions. Bonjour Tristesse was released in 1958 and stars Jean Seberg, Deborah Kerr and David Niven.
- Canadian dark ambient band Soufferance based and themed their 2011 concept extended play on the book. Titled Bonjour Tristesse, the EP features a single 17-minute song. A follow-up concept album was released a year later, titled Adieu Tristesse, which also took elements from the novel.
- French artist Frédéric Rébéna had adapted Bonjour Tristesse into a graphic novel, with NBM Publishing scheduled to release an English version in 2026.
- Canadian filmmaker Durga Chew-Bose adapted Bonjour Tristesse into a feature film in 2024, starring Lily McInerny, Claes Bang, Nailia Harzoune, Aliocha Schneider, and Chloë Sevigny.

== See also ==
- Le Monde's 100 Books of the Century
