= Durga Chew-Bose =

Canadian essayist

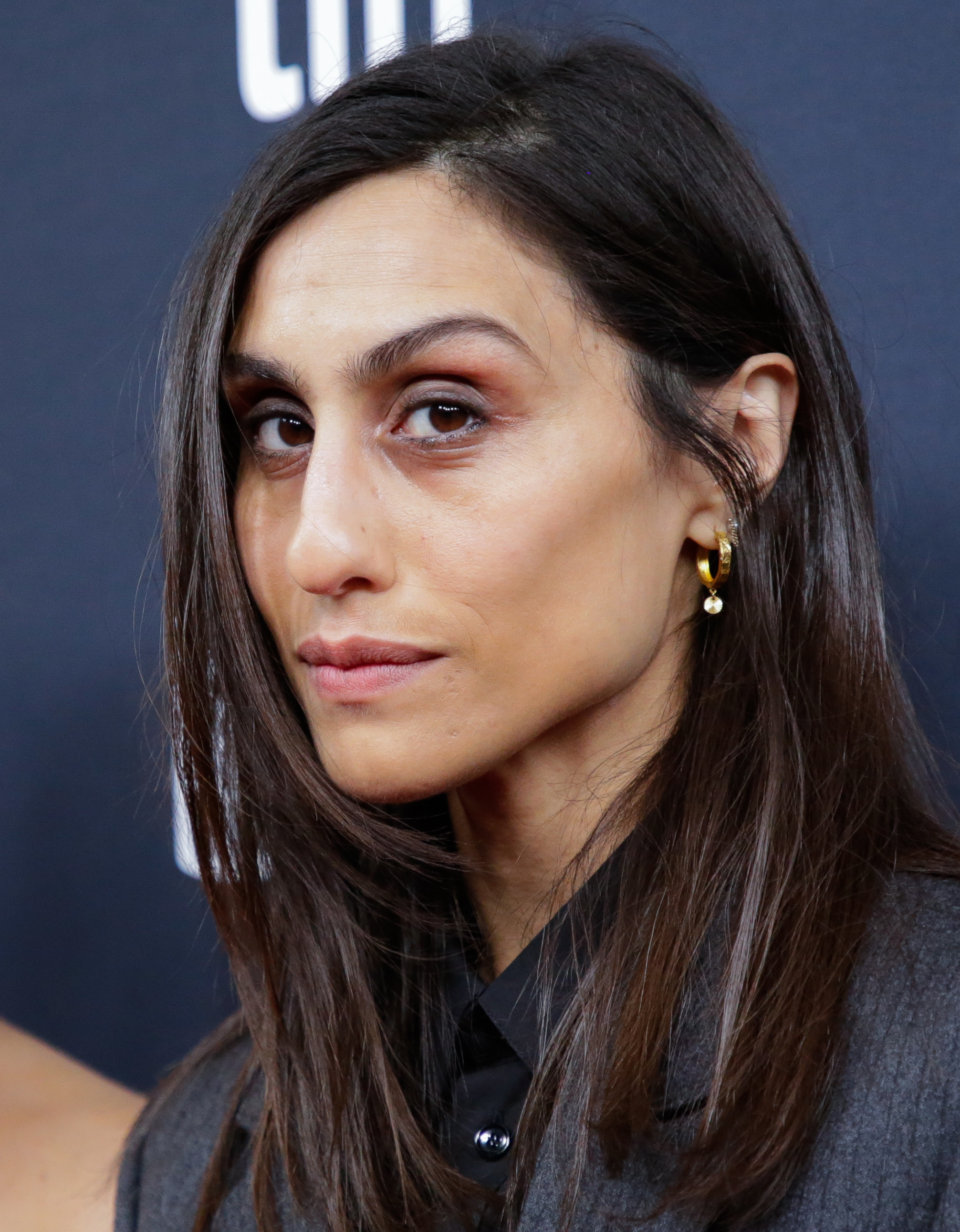
- Chew-Bose in 2024
- Born: Montreal, Canada
- Education: Sarah Lawrence College
- Occupation: Writer
- Notable work: Too Much and Not the Mood

Durga Chew-Bose is a Canadian writer and film director. Her first book, Too Much and Not the Mood, was published in 2017. Her first film, Bonjour Tristesse, which she adapted from the Françoise Sagan novel by the same name, debuted at the 2024 Toronto International Film Festival.

== Early life ==
Chew-Bose was born in Montreal; her parents are from Kolkata, India. Her parents named her after the character Durga in the Satyajit Ray-directed film Pather Panchali. Chew-Bose moved to the United States at 17 to attend boarding school in New Mexico for two years. She studied at Sarah Lawrence College and spent a year at the University of Oxford.

== Career ==
Chew-Bose has written for publications including The Guardian, BuzzFeed, The Hairpin, Rolling Stone, GQ, The New Inquiry, n+1, Interview, Paper, Hazlitt, and This Recording. In Nylon, Kristen Iverson described Chew-Bose as "one of our most gifted, insightful essayists and critics"; in The Guardian, Sarah Galo said: "If millennials have an intelligentsia, Brooklyn-based writer Durga Chew-Bose is a member of it[, writing] thoughtful long reads on identity and culture that command readers’ attention."

Chew-Bose has also taught writing at Sarah Lawrence College. She has listed Agnès Varda and Wong Kar-wai among her important influences.

=== Too Much and Not the Mood ===
Taking its title from one of Virginia Woolf's diary entries from 1931, Chew-Bose's Too Much and Not the Mood is an essay collection describing "the complications of growing up and establishing oneself...what it means to be a brown girl in a white world and 'the beautiful dilemma of being first-generation' Canadian."

Critics have emphasized the stylistic innovation of Chew-Bose's writing in the collection. Naming Too Much and Not the Mood to a Bustle list of "15 Most Anticipated Feminist Book Releases Of 2017," Sadie L. Trombetta described the book as a "collection of essays, letters, prose, and poetry." Listing Too Much and Not the Mood among the 25 "Most Exciting Book Releases for 2017", Maris Kreizman said in New York Magazine's Vulture: "If you admire Maggie Nelson’s ability to combine the personal and the academic into a thrilling new art form, Durga Chew-Bose will be your next favorite writer." Publishers Weekly said of the collection: "Twists in language and heady cultural references elevate Chew-Bose’s debut above the recent crop of personal essay collections by young writers."

=== Writers of Color ===
In 2015, Chew-Bose cofounded the website Writers of Color with Buster Bylander, Jazmine Hughes and Vijith Assar. The site is a searchable database of contemporary writers of color.

=== Bonjour Tristesse ===
Bonjour Tristesse, Chew-Bose's debut feature film as a director premiered at the 2024 Toronto International Film Festival. She was also announced as the winner of the Emerging Talent Award at the 2024 TIFF Tribute Awards.

== Publications ==
- Too Much and Not the Mood. New York: Farrar, Straus and Giroux. 2017. ISBN 9780374535957. OCLC 946693764.
