= Françoise Sagan =

French writer (1935–2004)

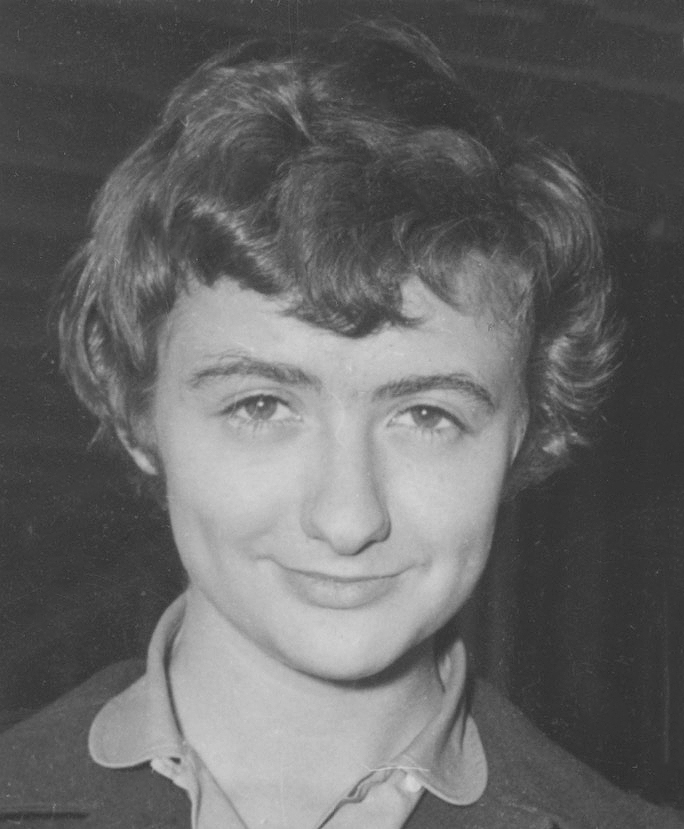
- Sagan in 1958
- Born: Françoise Delphine Quoirez; 21 June 1935; Cajarc, France
- Died: 24 September 2004 (aged 69); Équemauville, France
- Resting place: Cimetière de Seuzac, Cajarc, France
- Occupations: Novelist; screenwriter; dramatist
- Spouse(s): Guy Schoeller (m. 1958; div. 1960) Bob Westhoff (m. 1962; div. 1963)
- Children: 1

Françoise Sagan (French: [fʁɑ̃swaz saɡɑ̃]; born Françoise Delphine Quoirez; 21 June 1935 – 24 September 2004) was a French playwright, novelist, and screenwriter. Sagan was known for works with strong romantic themes involving wealthy and disillusioned bourgeois characters. Her best-known novel was her first, Bonjour Tristesse (1954), which was written when she was a teenager.

== Biography ==
=== Early life ===
Sagan was born on 21 June 1935 in Cajarc, Lot, and spent her early childhood in Lot, surrounded by animals, a passion that stayed with her throughout her life. Nicknamed 'Kiki', she was the youngest child of bourgeois parents – her father a company director, and her mother the daughter of landowners.

Her family spent World War II (1939–1945) in the Dauphiné, then in the Vercors. Her paternal great-grandmother was Russian from Saint Petersburg. The family had a home in the prosperous 17th arrondissement of Paris, to which they returned after the war. Sagan was expelled from her first school, a convent, for "lack of deep spirituality". She was expelled from the Louise-de-Bettignies School because she had "hanged a bust of Molière with a piece of string". She obtained her baccalauréat on the second attempt, at the cours Hattemer, and was admitted to the Sorbonne in the fall of 1952. She was an indifferent student, and did not graduate.

=== Career ===
During a literary career lasting until 1998, Sagan produced dozens of works, many of which have been filmed. She took the pseudonym "Sagan" from a character (Princesse de Sagan) in Marcel Proust's À la recherche du temps perdu (In Search of Lost Time). Sagan's first novel, Bonjour Tristesse (Hello Sadness), was published in 1954, when she was 18 years old. It was an immediate international success. The novel concerns the life of a pleasure-driven 17-year-old named Cécile and her relationship with her boyfriend and her widowed playboy father. Following the international success of Bonjour Tristesse, Sagan became a defining figure of post-war French youth culture. In 1958, The New York Times designated her one of France's "Fabulous Five" cultural stars alongside painter Bernard Buffet, actress Brigitte Bardot, filmmaker Roger Vadim, and couturier Yves Saint Laurent, characterizing Sagan as the "voice" of the new generation.

Sagan maintained the austere style of the French psychological novel, even while the nouveau roman was in vogue. The conversations between her characters are often considered to contain existential undertones. In an interview in 1960, she said her main themes were "solitude and love." In his study of Sagan’s cultural impact, French scholar, Flavien Falantin traces the links between Sagan and existentialism and its most-noted philosopher, Jean-Paul Sartre.

Though never his disciple, in a chapter titled “Love Letter to Jean-Paul Sartre” in her memoir, With Fondest Regards, Sagan recounts how important the philosopher’s writings were to her when she was young. Sagan became friendly with Sartre and included a moment in her second novel, A Certain Smile, when the narrator “threw herself” into Sartre’s “very beautiful book, The Age of Reason.” Sartre returned the compliment: her writing was “innovative” and expressed “something new, drawn from her own experience.” Her success, he felt, was “justified.”

In addition to novels, plays, and an autobiography, she wrote song lyrics and screenplays. In the 1960s, Sagan became more devoted to writing plays, which, though lauded for excellent dialogue, were only moderately successful. Afterward, she concentrated on her career as a novelist.

In 1960, at the height of the Algerian war, she signed the Manifesto of the 121. In retaliation, the extreme right-wing terrorist organization OAS planted a bomb at her parents' home on August 23, 1961, but the explosion caused only material damage.

=== Personal life ===
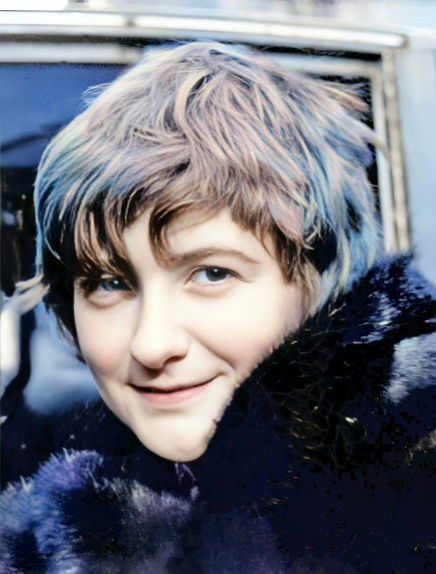
Sagan boarding a ferry during the honeymoon after her marriage with Robert Westhoff, 1962

Sagan was married twice. On 13 March 1958, she married her first husband, Guy Schoeller, an editor with Hachette, who was 20 years older than Sagan. The couple divorced in June, 1960. In 1962, she married Bob Westhoff, a young American playboy and would-be ceramicist. The couple divorced in 1963; their son Denis Westhoff was born in June 1962. She then had a long-term relationship with fashion stylist Peggy Roche. She also had a male lover, Bernard Frank, a married essayist and began a long-term affair with the French Playboy editor Annick Geille, after Geille approached Sagan for an article for her magazine.

Fond of traveling in the United States, Sagan often was seen with Truman Capote and Ava Gardner. On 14 April 1957, while driving her Aston Martin sports car at speed, she was involved in an accident that left her in a coma for some time. During her recovery she became dependent on the pain medication she was prescribed, a topic she wrote about in her nonfiction work, Toxique. She also loved driving her Jaguar automobile to Monte Carlo for gambling sessions.

In the 1990s, Sagan was charged with and convicted of possession of cocaine.

In 2010, her son Denis established the Prix Françoise Sagan.

=== Death ===
Sagan’s health was reported to be poor in the 2000s. In 2002, she was unable to appear at a trial in which she was convicted of tax fraud in a case involving the former French President François Mitterrand and she received a suspended sentence. Sagan died of a pulmonary embolism in Honfleur, Calvados on 24 September 2004 at the age of 69. At her own request she was buried in Seuzac (Lot), close to her beloved birthplace, Cajarc.

In his memorial statement, the French President Jacques Chirac said: "With her death, France loses one of its most brilliant and sensitive writers – an eminent figure of our literary life."

She wrote her own obituary for the Dictionary of Authors compiled by Jérôme Garcin: "Appeared in 1954 with a slender novel, Bonjour tristesse, which created a scandal worldwide. Her death, after a life and a body of work that were equally pleasant and botched, was a scandal only for herself."

== Film ==
Sagan's life was dramatized in a biographical film, Sagan, directed by Diane Kurys, released in France on 11 June 2008. The French actress Sylvie Testud played the title role.

== Works ==
=== Novels ===
- Bonjour tristesse (1954, translated twice with the same title: by Irene Ash, 1955; and by Heather Lloyd, 2013)

The British edition of Ash's translation (John Murray) contained many small cuts and alterations to Sagan's text. Some of these were restored and rectified in the U.S. edition (E. P. Dutton). Lloyd's translation is unexpurgated.

- Un certain sourire (1955, translated three times as A Certain Smile: by Anne Green into American English, 1956; by Irene Ash into British English, 1956; and by Heather Lloyd, 2013)

Dissatisfied with Ash's translation of Bonjour tristesse, the costs of which it shared with John Murray, E. P. Dutton ended the collaboration and turned to the Paris-based American writer Anne Green, who produced a "pacey" and "somewhat less coy" translation of Sagan's second novel for the U.S. market. Ash's translation of Un certain sourire again suffered from cuts and alterations, although these were less extensive than those to Bonjour tristesse. Lloyd's translation is unexpurgated.

- Dans un mois, dans un an (1957, translated twice as Those Without Shadows: into American English by Frances Frenaye, 1957; and into British English by Irene Ash, 1957)

The second and last of Sagan's novels to appear in separate British and U.S. translations.

- Aimez-vous Brahms? (1959, translated by Peter Wiles with the same title, 1960)

With Aimez-vous Brahms? John Murray and E. P. Dutton resumed their collaboration, minus Irene Ash and with Dutton initially choosing the translator. All of Sagan's work from this point was introduced to anglophone readers in a common transatlantic translation, localised for the British and U.S. markets as necessary, whether from these publishers or others.

- Les Merveilleux Nuages (1961, translated by Anne Green as Wonderful Clouds, 1961)
- La Chamade (1965, translated by Robert Westhoff with the same title, 1966; and by Douglas Hofstadter as That Mad Ache, 2009)
- Le Garde du cœur (1968, translated by Robert Westhoff as The Heart-Keeper, 1968)
- Un peu de soleil dans l'eau froide (1969, translated by Joanna Kilmartin as Sunlight on Cold Water, 1971; the American English version appeared as A Few Hours of Sunlight, 1971, credited to Terence Kilmartin)
- Des bleus à l'âme (1972, translated by Joanna Kilmartin as Scars on the Soul, 1974)
- Un profil perdu (1974, translated by Joanna Kilmartin as Lost Profile, 1976)
- Le Lit défait (1977, translated by Abigail Israel as The Unmade Bed, 1978)
- Le Chien couchant (1980, translated by C. J. Richards as Salad Days in the U.S., 1984; and as Le Chien couchant in the UK, 1985)
- La Femme fardée (1981, translated by Lee Fahnestock as The Painted Lady, 1983)
- Un orage immobile (1983, translated by Christine Donougher as The Still Storm, 1984; American English version, 1986)
- De guerre lasse (1985, translated by Christine Donougher as Engagements of the Heart in the UK and as A Reluctant Hero in the U.S., both 1987)
- Un sang d'aquarelle (1987, translated by Anthea Bell as Painting in Blood, 1991)
- La Laisse (1989, translated by Christine Donougher as The Leash, 1991)
- Les Faux-fuyants (1991, translated by Elfreda Powell as Evasion, 1993)
- Un chagrin de passage (1994, translated by Richard Seaver as A Fleeting Sorrow, 1995)
- Le Miroir égaré (1996)
- Les Quatre Coins du cœur (2019, translated by Sophie R. Lewis as The Four Corners of the Heart, 2023)

=== Short story collections ===
- Des yeux de soie (1975, translated by Joanna Kilmartin as Silken Eyes, 1977)
- Musiques de scène (1981, translated by C. J. Richards as Incidental Music, 1983)
- La Maison de Raquel Vega (1985)

=== Plays ===
- Château en Suède (1960, translated by Lucienne Hill as Castle in Sweden, 1962)
- Les Violons parfois (1961)
- La Robe mauve de Valentine (1963)
- Bonheur, impair et passe (1964)
- L'Écharde (1966)
- Le Cheval évanoui (1966)
- Un piano dans l'herbe (1970)
- Il fait beau jour et nuit (1978)
- L'Excès contraire (1987)

=== Ballet ===
- Le Rendez-vous manqué (1958)
  Created in January 1958 at the Opéra de Monte-Carlo before transferring to Paris; music by Michel Magne, direction by Roger Vadim, sets by Bernard Buffet. Variety's reviewer thought Buffet's sets and Claude Bolling's playing in the orchestra were the best things about it.

=== Autobiographical works ===
- Toxique (1964, journal, translated by Frances Frenaye with the same title, 1965)
- Réponses (1975, translated by David Macey as Night Bird: Conversations with Françoise Sagan, 1980)
- Avec mon meilleur souvenir (1984, translated by Christine Donougher as With Fondest Regards, 1985)
- Au marbre: chroniques retrovées 1952–1962 (1988, chronicles)
- Répliques (1992, interviews)
- ...Et toute ma sympathie (1993, a sequel to Avec mon meilleur souvenir)
- Derrière l'épaule (1998, autobiography)

Published posthumously by L'Herne:

- Bonjour New-York (2007)
- Un certain regard (2008, compilation of material from Réponses and Répliques)
- Maisons louées (2008)
- Le Régal des chacals (2008)
- Au cinéma (2008)
- De très bons livres (2008)
- La Petite Robe noire (2008)
- Lettre de Suisse (2008)

=== Biographical works ===
- Brigitte Bardot (1975)
- Sarah Bernhardt, ou le rire incassable (1987, translated by Sabine Destrée as Dear Sarah Bernhardt, 1988)

=== Screenwriter ===
- Landru, directed by Claude Chabrol (1963)
- The Ball of Count Orgel, directed by Marc Allégret (1970)
- Les Borgia, ou Le Sang doré, directed by Alain Dhénaut (1977)
- The Blue Ferns, directed by Françoise Sagan (1977, TV film)

== Selected screen adaptations of Sagan's work ==
- Bonjour Tristesse, directed by Otto Preminger (1958, based on the novel Bonjour Tristesse)
- A Certain Smile, directed by Jean Negulesco (1958, based on the novel A Certain Smile)
- Love Play, directed by François Moreuil and Fabien Collin (1961, based on the short story La Récréation)
- Goodbye Again, directed by Anatole Litvak (1961, based on the novel Aimez-vous Brahms?)
- Nutty, Naughty Chateau, directed by Roger Vadim (1963, based on the play Château en Suède)
- La Chamade, directed by Alain Cavalier (1968, based on the novel La Chamade)
- Un peu de soleil dans l'eau froide, directed by Jacques Deray (1971, based on the novel Un peu de soleil dans l'eau froide)
- The Blue Ferns, directed by Françoise Sagan (1977, TV film, based on the short story Des yeux de soie)
- Bonheur, impair et passe, directed by Roger Vadim (1977, TV film, based on the play Bonheur, impair et passe)
- De guerre lasse, directed by Robert Enrico (1987, based on the novel De guerre lasse)
- La Femme fardée, directed by José Pinheiro (1990, based on the novel La Femme fardée)
- Château en Suède, directed by Josée Dayan (2008, TV film, based on the play Château en Suède)
- Bonjour Tristesse, directed by Durga Chew-Bose (2024, based on the novel Bonjour Tristesse)
