= Hayley Barker =

American painter

Hayley Barker is an American painter.

== Biography ==
Hayley Barker was born in Oregon in 1973. She received her BA from the University of Oregon, and her MA & MFA in Intermedia from the University of Iowa. She has had solo exhibitions at Ingleby Gallery, Edinburgh, Scotland; Night Gallery, Los Angeles, CA; SHRINE New York, NY and BozoMag, Los Angeles, CA. She has participated in group shows at Acquavella, New York, NY; Harper's, East Hampton, NY; Nicodim, Los Angeles, CA; Night Gallery, Los Angeles, CA; and SHRINE New York, NY, among others. Barker has been featured in several publications including Artforum, Artillery Magazine, BOMB Magazine, Forbes, Hyperallergic, Juxtapoz, LA Weekly, and W Magazine. She lives and works in Los Angeles, California.

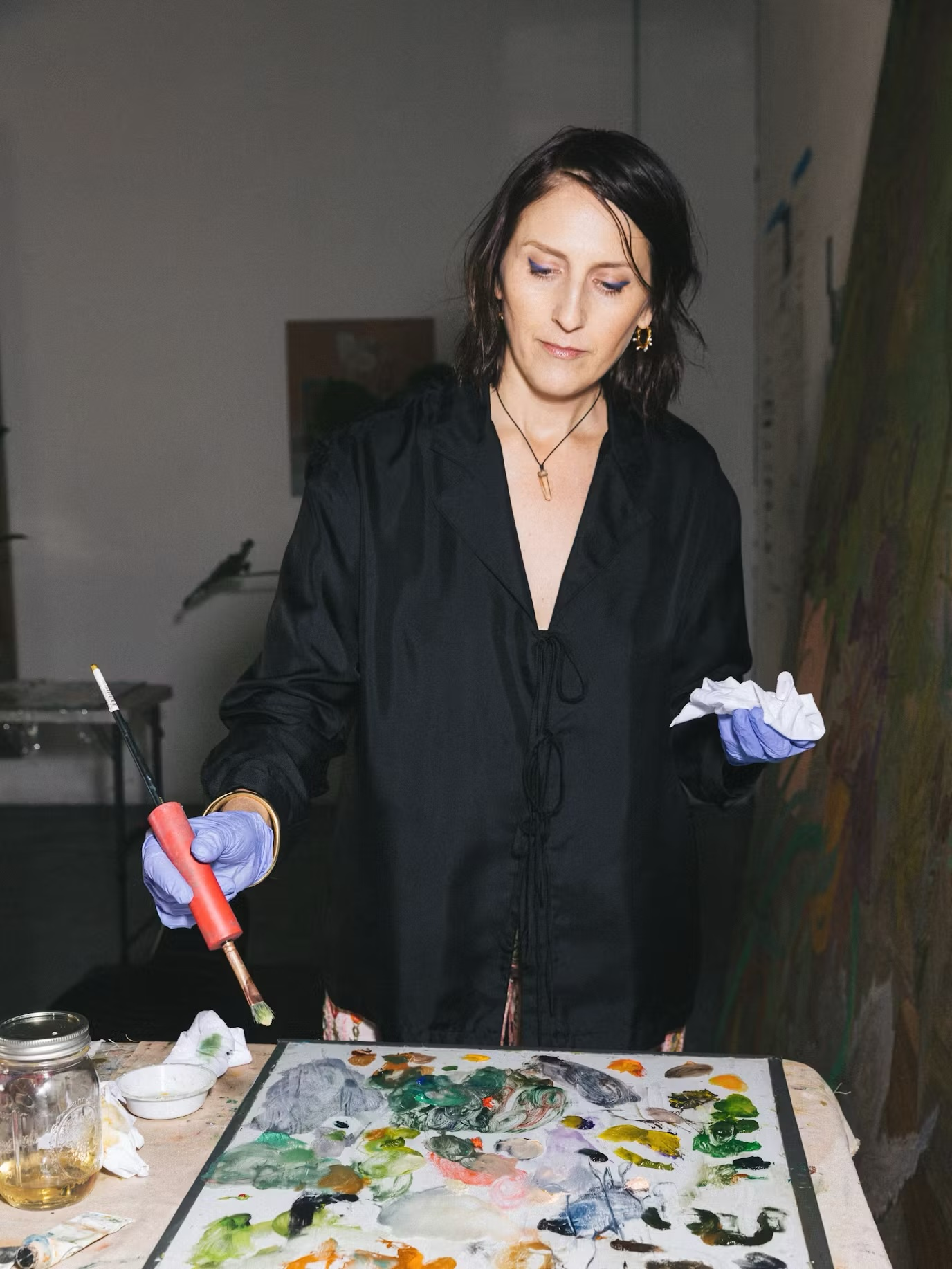
Hayley Barker in her studio.

== Background and early work ==
Hayley Barker's father worked for the Department of Energy, while her mother worked in bookstores and raised Barker and her four sisters. Born in Dallas, Oregon, and raised in Salem, Oregon, in a progressive, intellectual household, Barker recalls her father writing poetry and horror stories, and being surrounded by books on Dada and Duchamp.

While earning a Bachelor of Fine Art at the University of Oregon, Barker was heavily influenced by the Riot Grrrl movement and became interested in performance and video art. Drawn to the legacy of Ana Mendieta, she chose to pursue a Master of Fine Art at the University of Iowa in performance and video art, where Mendieta had studied. Barker describes the work she created in her 20s as dramatic, symbolic, and ritualistic—an attempt to transform pain into something between beauty and horror.

Although drawing and sometimes painting remained a consistent part of her practice throughout her life, Hayley Barker switched from performance and video art to drawing after graduate school. She recalls the transition as natural and necessary, stating "I no longer need an audience as witness" in an interview with Juxtapose Magazine. Not until her move from Oregon to Los Angeles, in approximately 2016 did she transition to creating the landscape paintings for which she is now known.

=== Themes ===
Hayley Barker's paintings feature intimate depictions of everyday landscape that explore themes of spirituality, nature, and transformation. Using individual brushstrokes on raw linen, she captures a sense of mystery in familiar scenes, aiming to deepen her understanding of her relationship to her surroundings through memory and imagination over time . Color plays a central role in Barker's practice, with her experience of synesthesia influencing her holistic interpretation of the landscape as a multi-sensory experience. In an interview with Paul Maziar from Bomb Magazine, she shares that she strives to produce scenes "not how I see, but how I feel, and how that affects what I see". Barker’s engagement with earth-based spirituality, drawing from goddess traditions and seasonal cycles, informs the sense of space in her work, where passageways lead to dense flora or celestial elements, as seen in Aquarius Moon, Valentine St., 2023. In The Ringing Stone exhibition at Ingleby, Edinburgh (15 June–31 August 2024), she explores lunar and seasonal cycles used in the Wheel of the Year.

=== Influences ===
During her education, Barker drew inspiration from Ana Mendieta and the Riot Grrrl movement. In the transition to painting, Barker was drawn to the painterly brush strokes and use of color of Pierre Bonnard, Peter Doig, and Marlene Dumas, while also citing Gustav Klimt, Gustave Moreau, Edvard Munch, and Odilon Redon as influences.

==== Important exhibitions ====
Of Barker's first solo exhibition in New York with Shrine in 2020 Barry Schwabsky, art critic and historian, wrote:

Barker's paintings elaborate spaces that can't be nailed down and identified. She calls them "spaces of passage," of transition—across the immeasurable distance from life to death, perhaps, but also within life, from one physical or spiritual state to another. Her works speak of mystery, loss: intimations of what lies beyond the boundaries of the self."

Her 2024 solo exhibition "The Ringing Stone" in Edinburgh, Scotland was deemed "One of the most beautiful shows" in the Edinburgh Art Festival by Wallpaper* reviewer Hugo Macdonald. The exhibition's titular painting depicts a prehistoric carved stone on the island of Tiree.

In response to earlier work in 2011, art critic Sue Taylor reviewed Barker's show "Cathedrals" in "Art in America":

In depictions of sylvan streams and animated skies, Barker conveys a hypersensitive communion with the environment; in the process, she also imparts, with thick impasto and buttery surfaces, an ecstatic sense of the sumptuous materiality of oil paint.

Taylor compared Barker's paintings to the work of Georgia O'Keeffe and Vincent van Gogh. Barker's "Cathedrals" is inspired by the childhood diary of Opal Whiteley, who had visionary, spiritual experiences but was later diagnosed as schizophrenic:

In art, as in religion and madness, consciousness can be other than ordinary. Barker strives to imagine and approximate this deranged susceptibility, listening attentively for voices in the wind.

== Solo exhibitions ==
- 2024 "The Ringing Stone," Ingleby Gallery
- 2023 "Last Morning at El Centro," CVG Foundation, Beijing
- 2023 "Laguna Castle," Night Gallery, Los Angeles
- 2022 "Bozo House," BozoMag, Los Angeles
- 2022 "The Spider," SHRINE, NYC
- 2021 "Incense", The Armory Art Fair with Shrine, NYC
- 2020 "The Grass is Blue", SHRINE, NYC
- 2020 ALAC, Bozo Mag, LA
- 2019 "LATE BLOOMER," Bozo Mag, LA
- 2018 "Hayley Barker: Open Studio," Bozo Mag, LA
- 2018 "AMPM," Holding Contemporary/Williamson Knight, Portland, OR
- 2017 "New Paintings" Bozo Mag/Abode, LA

== Group exhibitions ==
- 2024 "Afterglow: A Collaboration with Night Gallery," Acquavella Gallery, Palm Beach
- 2024 "Connections: Wingate Studio at David Krut Projects"
- 2024 "Arcadia and Elsewhere," James Cohan
- 2023 "Clairvoyance," SHRINE NYC
- 2023 "PUBLIC PRIVATE," Pond Society, Shanghai
- 2023 "Death of an Outsider," SHRINE, Los Angeles
- 2022: "Unnatural Nature: Post-Pop Landscapes," Acquavella Gallery, NYC
- 2022: "Shrubs," Night Gallery, Los Angeles
- 2021: "The Rock," BozoMag in collaboration with Pocket Studio, Los Angeles
- 2021 "36 Paintings," Harper's East Hampton
- 2021 "The Language of Flowers," Reyes Finn, Detroit, MI
- 2020 "Eartha" Adams and Ollman, Portland, OR
- 2020 "Untitled, (But Loved)" Bosse & Baum, London
- 2020 NADA: This is fair
- 2020 "New Beginnings..." Nicodim, LA
- 2020 Connections: Shrine, NYC
- 2020 "Conscious Collaboration with Spirit," SOIL Gallery, Seattle
- 2019 "Summer Formal," La Loma Projects, LA
- 2018 "Take Care," GAS, LA
- 2018 "The Divine Joke," Anita Rogers Gallery, NY
