= Vinegar tasters =

Traditional subject in Chinese painting

The Vinegar Tasters
- Traditional Chinese: 三酸圖
- Simplified Chinese: 三酸图
Transcriptions
Standard Mandarin
- Hanyu Pinyin: Sān suān tú
Yue: Cantonese
- Yale Romanization: Sāam syūn tòuh
- Jyutping: Saam1 syun1 tou4

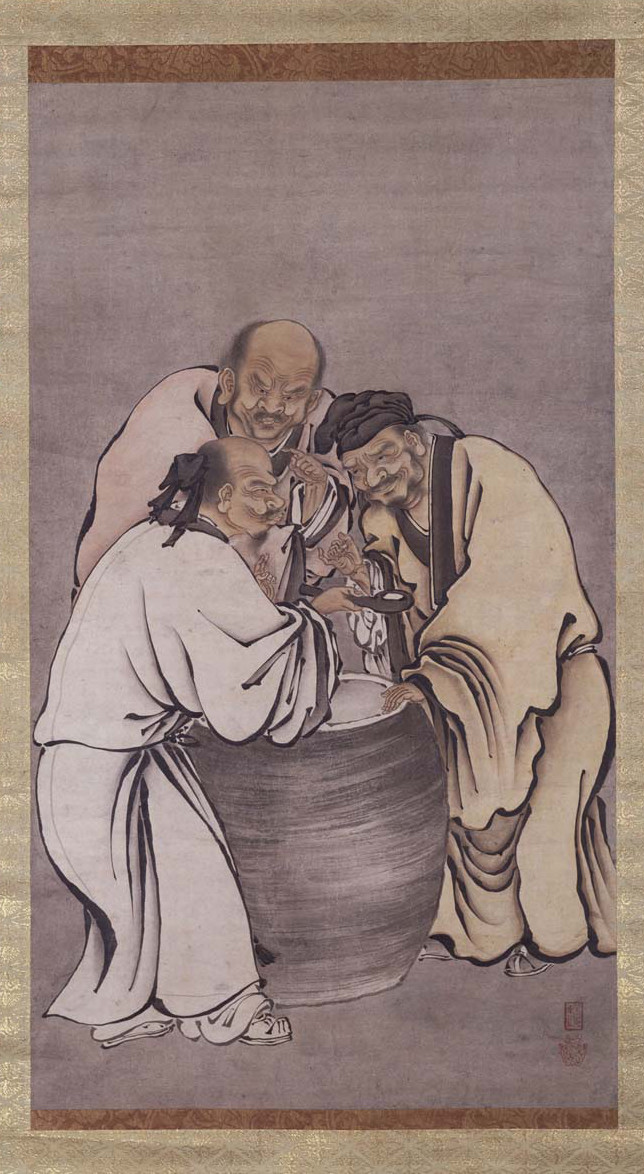
The Three Vinegar Tasters, depicting Confucius, Buddha, and Laozi over a pot of vinegar, respectively perceiving it as sour, bitter and sweet. Painting by an artist of the Kanō school. Japan, Muromachi period, 16th century.

The Vinegar Tasters (三酸圖; 'three sours'; 嘗醋翁; 'vinegar-tasting old men'; 嘗醋圖, 尝醋图) is a traditional subject in Chinese painting, which later spread to other East Asian countries.

The allegorical image represents three elderly men tasting vinegar. The identity of the three men varies. Chinese versions often interpret the three men to be Su Shi, Huang Tingjian, and a monk named Foyin. Other variations depict the three men to be the founders of China's major religious and philosophical traditions: Confucianism, Buddhism, and Taoism. The three men are dipping their fingers in a vat of vinegar and tasting it; one man reacts with a sour expression, one reacts with a bitter expression, and one reacts with a sweet expression. The three men are Confucius, Buddha, and Laozi, respectively. Each man's expression represents the predominant attitude of his philosophy: Confucianism saw life as sour, in need of rules to correct the degeneration of people; Buddhism saw life as bitter, dominated by pain and suffering due to the attachment to possessions and material desires; and Taoism saw life as sweet due to it being fundamentally perfect in its natural state. Another interpretation of the painting is that, since the three men are gathered around one vat of vinegar, the "three teachings" are one.

== Interpretations ==
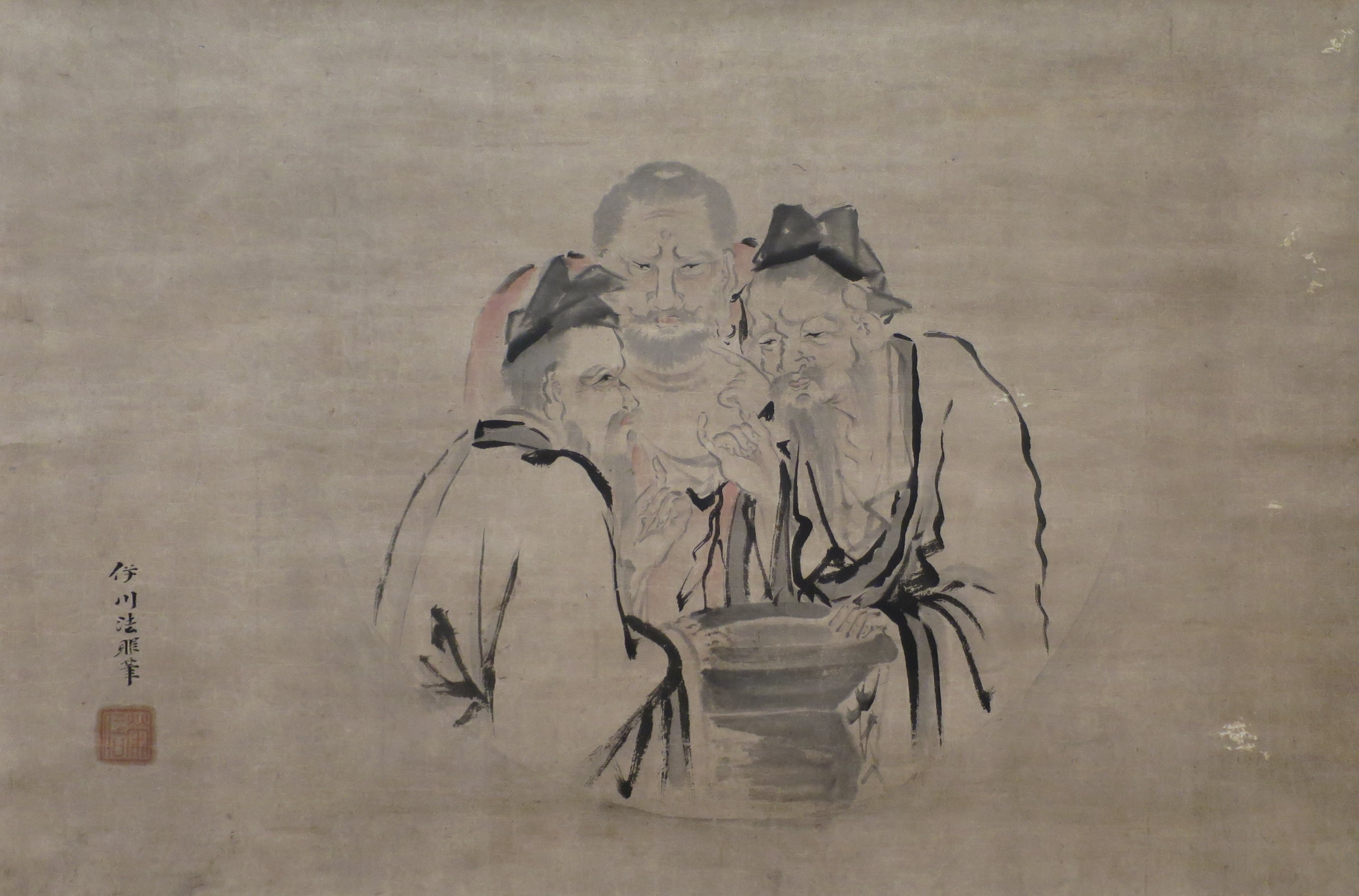
Painting by Kanō Isen'in. Japan, Edo period, 1802-1816.

=== Confucianism ===
Confucianism saw life as sour, in need of rules to correct the degeneration of people, and the present was out of step of the past and that the government and the people had no understanding of the way of Heaven—the right response was to worship the ancestors.

Confucianism, being concerned with the outside world, viewed the vinegar as "polluted wine".

=== Buddhism ===
During Buddha's first sermon he preached, "neither the extreme of indulgence nor the extremes of asceticism was acceptable as a way of life and that one should avoid extremes and seek to live in the middle way". "Thus the goal of basic Buddhist practice is not the achievement of a state of bliss in some heaven but the extinguishing of Taṇhā. When tanha is extinguished, one is released from the cycle of life (birth, suffering, death, and rebirth)", only then will they achieve Nirvana.

With this in mind, it is interpreted that Buddhism, being concerned with the self, viewed the vinegar as a polluter of the taster's body due to its extreme flavor. Another interpretation for the image is that Buddhism reports the facts as they are, that vinegar is vinegar and isn't naturally sweet on the tongue. Pretending it is sweet is denying what it is, while the equally harmful opposite is being disturbed by the sourness.

=== Taoism (Daoism) ===
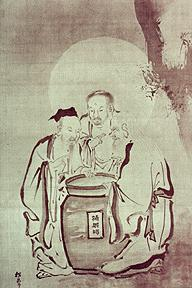

Taoism sees life as sweet due to it being fundamentally perfect in its natural state.

From the Taoist point of view, sourness and bitterness come from the interfering and unappreciative mind. Life itself, when understood and utilized for what it is, is sweet. That is the message of "The Vinegar Tasters".

— Benjamin Hoff, The Tao of Pooh

In the vinegar tasters picture, Laozi's (Lao Tzu) expression is sweet because of how the teachings of Taoism view existence. Every natural thing is intrinsically good as long as it remains true to its nature. This perspective allows Laozi to experience the taste of vinegar without judging it. "Ah this," he might be thinking, "this is vinegar!" From such a perspective, the taste doesn't need to be sweet, sour, bitter or bland. It is simply the taste of vinegar. By openly experiencing vinegar as vinegar, Laozi acknowledges and participates in the harmony of nature. As this is the very goal of Taoism, whatever the taste of vinegar, the experience is good.

At the core of Taoist doctrine is the concept of the Tao or "the way". According to Taoist philosophy, everything originates from Tao. Tao is all embracing, existing anywhere and everywhere though it is invisible. It gives birth to the all, which then gives birth to everything in it. The Tao in this sense is the way of the everything, the driving power behind all.

== See also ==
- East Asian philosophy
- Three laughs at Tiger Brook
