= Colton, Washington =

Colton
- Town
- Colton, Washington
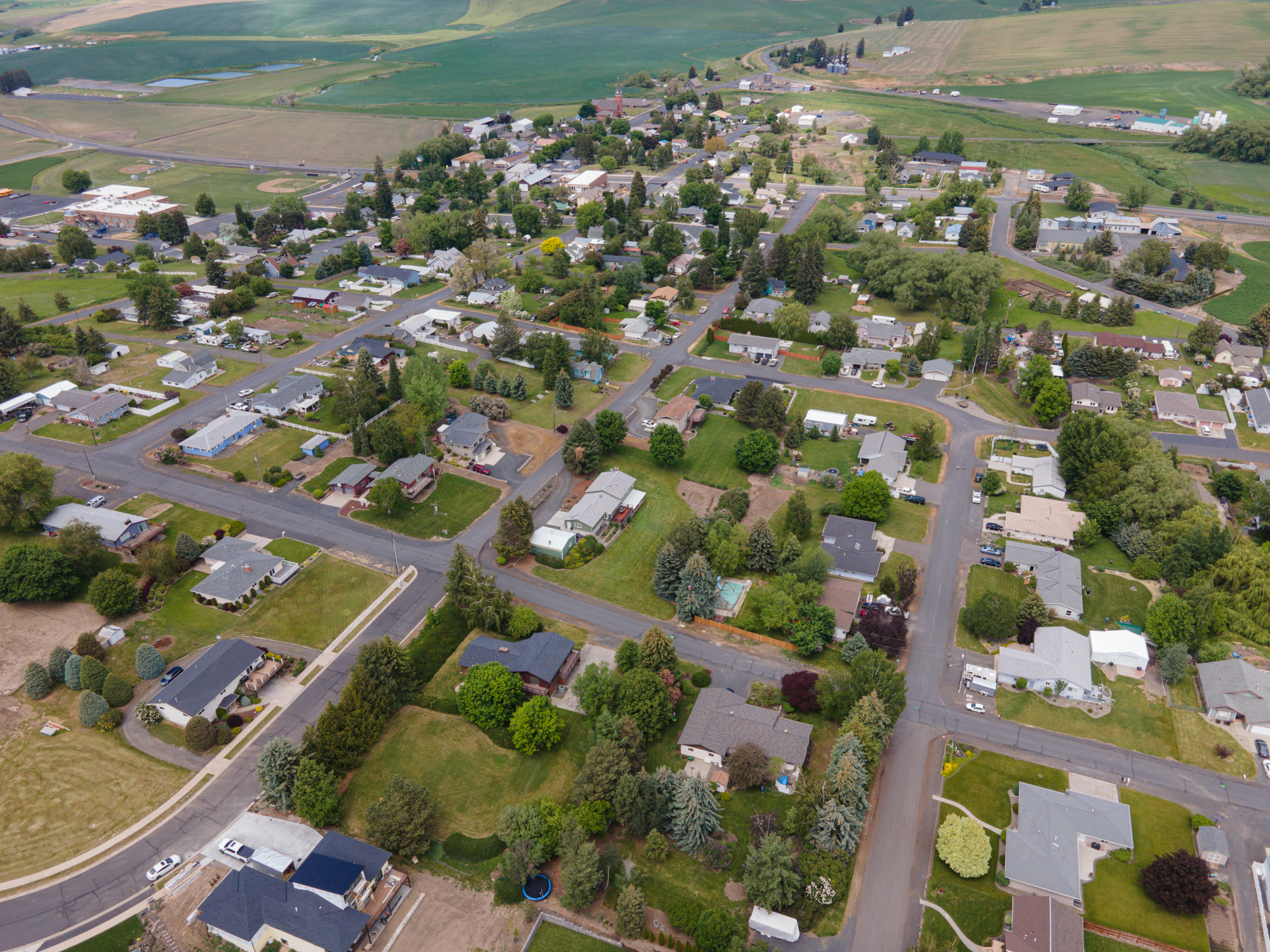
- Aerial view of Colton in 2023

- Location of Colton, Washington
- Coordinates: 46°34′03″N 117°07′32″W
- Country: United States
- State: Washington
- County: Whitman

Government
  - Type: Mayor–council
  - Mayor: Jerry Weber

Area
  - Total: 0.62 sq mi (1.60 km^{2})
  - Land: 0.62 sq mi (1.60 km^{2})
  - Water: 0 sq mi (0.00 km^{2})
- Elevation: 2,562 ft (781 m)

Population (2020)
  - Total: 401
  - Density: 649/sq mi (251/km^{2})
- Time zone: UTC-8 (Pacific (PST))
  - Summer (DST): UTC-7 (PDT)
- ZIP code: 99113
- Area code: 509
- FIPS code: 53-13890
- GNIS feature ID: 2413231
- Website: www.coltonwashington.us

Colton is a town in Whitman County, Washington, United States. The population was 401 at the 2020 census.

== History ==
Colton was first settled in 1879 by J.A. Cole, and was founded in 1882 by J.B. Stanley. Colton was incorporated in 1890; however, the incorporation documents were not recorded until 1893.

Plans for the formation of Colton were made in 1879. Several residents of the town of Uniontown, which was settled a few years earlier, had grown dissatisfied with the proprietor of that town. In June 1879, the town of Colton was surveyed and platted on the 480-acre farm of Gregor Kosher. That month L.J. Wolford moved his hotel to Colton and Chris Adamson moved his blacksmith shop to the new town. Dr. Cole erected the first new building on the corner of Steptoe and Broadway (now Main Street); J.B. Standley moved his small supply of merchandise into the new building. The town took its name from the first three letters of Cole, and the last three from Clinton, a son of Mr. Wolford, whose family was the first to live in Colton.

On October 10, 1879, John Standley was appointed postmaster and opened a post office in his own store. During the summer of 1880, a petition was granted by the county government at Asotin to separate Colton from the school district of Uniontown. The first school was opened in the Cole Building. Mrs. Viola Flowers was the first teacher.

Colton was a filming location for country artist Kenny Chesney in his 1995 hit song Me and You.

== Notable natives ==
- Mike Kramer, former head football coach at Eastern Washington, Montana State, and Idaho State
- Albert Rooks, captain of USS Houston (CA-30), posthumous Medal of Honor recipient
- Lowell Ward Rooks (1893−1973), army officer (brother of Albert)
- Opal Whiteley, nature writer and diarist

== Geography ==
Colton is located along U.S. Route 195 in the Palouse region of southeastern Washington, just west of the Idaho border.

According to the United States Census Bureau, the town has a total area of 0.59 square miles (1.53 km^{2}), all of it land.

Distances

- Pullman - 14 miles (23 km) north
- Lewiston, Idaho - 22 miles (35 km) south-southeast
- Clarkston - 23 miles (37 km) south
- Moscow, Idaho - 24 miles (39 km) north-northeast
- Colfax - 28 miles (45 km) north-northwest
- Spokane - 87 miles (140 km) north
- Walla Walla - 127 miles (204 km) southwest
- Kennewick - 151 miles (243 km) west-southwest
- Boise, Idaho - 288 miles (463 km) south

=== Climate ===
This region experiences warm (but not hot) and dry summers, with no average monthly temperatures above 71.6 °F. According to the Köppen Climate Classification system, Colton has a warm-summer Mediterranean climate, abbreviated "Csb" on climate maps.

== Demographics ==
Historical population
Census	Pop.	Note	%±
1900	251		—
1910	393		56.6%
1920	382		−2.8%
1930	269		−29.6%
1940	262		−2.6%
1950	207		−21.0%
1960	253		22.2%
1970	279		10.3%
1980	307		10.0%
1990	325		5.9%
2000	386		18.8%
2010	418		8.3%
2020	401		−4.1%
Source: U.S. Decennial Census

=== 2010 census ===
As of the 2010 census, there were 418 people, 164 households, and 126 families living in the town. The population density was 708.5 inhabitants per square mile (273.6/km^{2}). There were 167 housing units at an average density of 283.1 units per square mile (109.3 units/km^{2}). The racial makeup of the town was 95.5% White, 0.2% Native American, 0.7% Asian, 0.5% from other races, and 3.1% from two or more races. Hispanic or Latino of any race were 3.1% of the population.

There were 164 households, of which 33.5% had children under the age of 18 living with them, 68.9% were married couples living together, 6.7% had a female householder with no husband present, 1.2% had a male householder with no wife present, and 23.2% were non-families. 18.9% of all households were made up of individuals, and 6.1% had someone living alone who was 65 years of age or older. The average household size was 2.55 and the average family size was 2.91.

The median age in the town was 44.2 years. 26.1% of residents were under the age of 18; 5.3% were between the ages of 18 and 24; 19.9% were from 25 to 44; 33.3% were from 45 to 64; and 15.6% were 65 years of age or older. The gender makeup of the town was 51.0% male and 49.0% female.

=== 2000 census ===
As of the 2000 census, there were 386 people, 148 households, and 108 families living in the town. The population density was 655.0 people per square mile (252.9 people/km^{2}). There were 152 housing units at an average density of 257.9 units per square mile (99.6 units/km^{2}). The racial makeup of the town was 97.41% White, 1.04% Native American, 0.78% Asian, and 0.78% from two or more races. Hispanic or Latino of any race were 0.78% of the population.

There were 148 households, out of which 35.1% had children under the age of 18 living with them, 65.5% were married couples living together, 5.4% had a female householder with no husband present, and 26.4% were non-families. 24.3% of all households were made up of individuals, and 10.8% had someone living alone who was 65 years of age or older. The average household size was 2.61 and the average family size was 3.14.

In the town, the age distribution of the population shows 29.0% under the age of 18, 3.6% from 18 to 24, 28.2% from 25 to 44, 25.4% from 45 to 64, and 13.7% who were 65 years of age or older. The median age was 38 years. For every 100 females, there were 96.9 males. For every 100 females age 18 and over, there were 94.3 males.

The median income for a household in the town was $47,500, and the median income for a family was $56,875. Males had a median income of $38,125 versus $28,611 for females. The per capita income for the town was $21,506. About 3.5% of families and 2.7% of the population were below the poverty line, including 5.0% of those under age 18 and none of those age 65 or over.
