= USS Rooks =

Fletcher-class destroyer

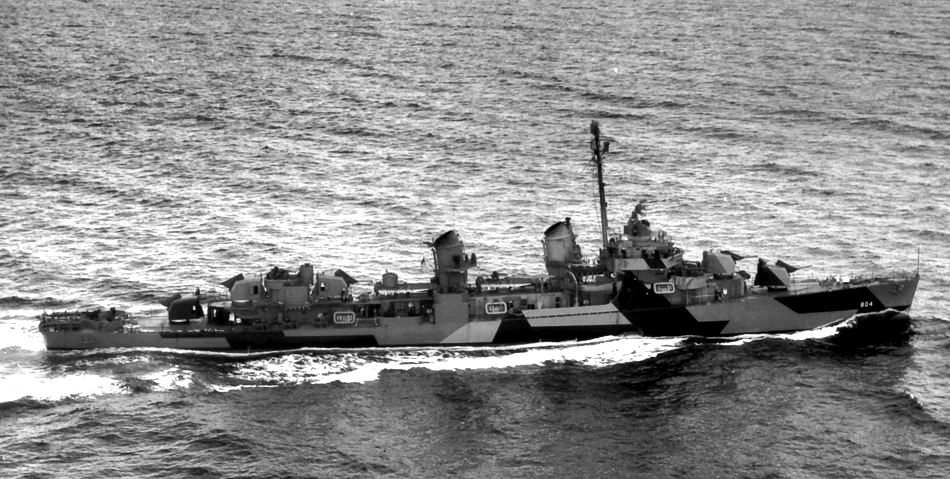
- USS Rooks in 1944

History

United States
- Name: Rooks
- Namesake: Albert H. Rooks
- Builder: Todd Pacific Shipyards, Seattle
- Laid down: 27 October 1943
- Launched: 6 June 1944
- Commissioned: 2 September 1944
- Decommissioned: 26 July 1962
- Stricken: 1 September 1975
- Identification: DD-804
- Fate: Transferred to Chile, 26 July 1962

Chile
- Name: Cochrane
- Namesake: Thomas Cochrane
- Acquired: 26 July 1962
- Stricken: 1983
- Fate: Scrapped, 1983

General characteristics
- Class & type: Fletcher-class destroyer
- Displacement: 2,050 tons
- Length: 376 ft 5 in (114.73 m)
- Beam: 39 ft 7 in (12.07 m)
- Draft: 17 ft 9 in (5.41 m)
- Propulsion: 60,000 shp (45,000 kW); Geared turbines; 2 propellers
- Speed: 37 kn (69 km/h; 43 mph)
- Range: 6,500 nmi (12,000 km; 7,500 mi) at 15 kn (28 km/h; 17 mph)
- Complement: 319
- Armament: 5 × 5 in (130 mm)/38 guns, 10 × 40 mm AA guns, 7 × 20 mm AA guns, 10 × 21 inch (533 mm) torpedo tubes, 6 × depth charge projectors, 2 × depth charge tracks

USS Rooks (DD-804) was a Fletcher-class destroyer of the United States Navy, named for Captain Albert H. Rooks (1891–1942) who was posthumously awarded the Medal of Honor after the Battle of Sunda Strait.

Rooks was laid down on 27 October 1943 by the Todd Pacific Shipyards, Seattle, Washington; launched on 6 June 1944; sponsored by Mrs. Edith R. Rooks, widow of Captain Rooks; and commissioned on 2 September 1944.

== Service history ==
=== World War II ===
Following shakedown off San Diego, California and an availability at the Puget Sound Navy Yard, Rooks steamed to the Hawaiian Islands for amphibious landing rehearsals and shore bombardment exercises. On 22 January 1945, she got under way in company with a flotilla of LSTs for Eniwetok, Marshall Islands—the first stop en route to the forward battle area. Rooks and her LSTs then proceeded to Saipan for another landing rehearsal.

Arriving at Iwo Jima on D-Day, 19 February 1945, Rooks sent her LSTs on their way to the beach, then assumed duties as a radar picket vessel. In the afternoon she proceeded to the southeastern corner of the island to cover the Marine landings and silenced several enemy batteries. Rooks again fired on the Iwo Jima beaches 21–22 February and 25–26 February losing one seaman to shrapnel from a mortar on the 22d. During this period Rooks also provided radar warning and antisubmarine protection on the screening cordon thrown around the island.

On 28 February, Rooks departed Iwo Jima for Saipan in the screen of a group of transports. She then proceeded in company with another destroyer to Ulithi; escorted two escort carriers to Leyte; and after training exercises, departed Leyte for Okinawa Gunto on 25 March.

Arriving at Okinawa Jima on Easter Sunday, 1 April 1945, Rooks began 87 consecutive days of shore bombardment during which she fired 18,624 rounds of 5 inch shells. During this period she went to general quarters for bona fide air alerts 131 times, and on four occasions was the direct target of kamikaze attack. She was credited with shooting down six enemy aircraft during the battle of Okinawa.

In addition to shore bombardment, Rooks also occupied antisubmarine and antiaircraft patrol stations, and for a number of nights steamed with the surface covering force for the island operation. Every second or third day she proceeded to Kerama Retto to replenish ammunition, fuel, and provisions.

6 April was the most critical day in Rooks' career. At 01:00 she assisted in shooting down six planes which attacked the Allied force. At about 16:00, her area was subjected to an enemy air attack by at least 110 planes and, between then and 16:48, she shot down one kamikaze and assisted in downing five others. At 17:12 she was called upon to assist and escort to port Hyman which had been badly damaged by a Japanese suicide plane. Arriving on the scene, Rooks found Hyman again under attack. After shooting down a Mitsubishi A6M "Zeke" and an Aichi D3A "Val", she escorted Hyman into the Hagushi anchorage and sent a medical officer and pharmacist's mates aboard to aid the wounded.

On 4 July, Rooks sortied with minecraft of various types and sizes, for a large-scale minesweeping operation to open the East China Sea. The only destroyer in the group, she was assigned as a fire support vessel, but her firing was confined to sinking drifting mines. She acted as a radar picket, as a "pointing" vessel in guiding the sweepers along their track, and was frequently called upon to furnish accurate navigational positions of the buoys laid to mark the limits of the swept area. This operation lasted throughout July.

On 1 August, Rooks sortied from Buckner Bay, Okinawa, to escort the cruisers Salt Lake City and Chester to Saipan. Proceeding on to Ulithi, she then escorted three transports to Leyte and after repairs, departed Leyte on 1 September. She escorted a group of LSTs to Okinawa, then, on the 11th, steamed for Nagasaki to assist in the repatriation of prisoners of war. She departed Nagasaki on the 15th for Okinawa with 92 former POWs, mostly British officers captured at Singapore. She then returned to Nagasaki and carried Rear Admiral William H. P. Blandy, Commander Destroyers, Pacific Fleet, to inspect the former great Japanese naval base of Sasebo. She continued to operate in Japanese and Okinawan waters until departing Yokosuka on 26 October for Pearl Harbor and San Francisco, where she arrived on 10 November.

On 15 November 1945, Rooks reported to the Pacific Reserve Fleet at Bremerton, Washington Assigned to the San Diego Group, she was placed out of commission, in reserve, on 11 June 1946 and was completely inactivated by 17 August 1946.

=== 1951 – 1962 ===
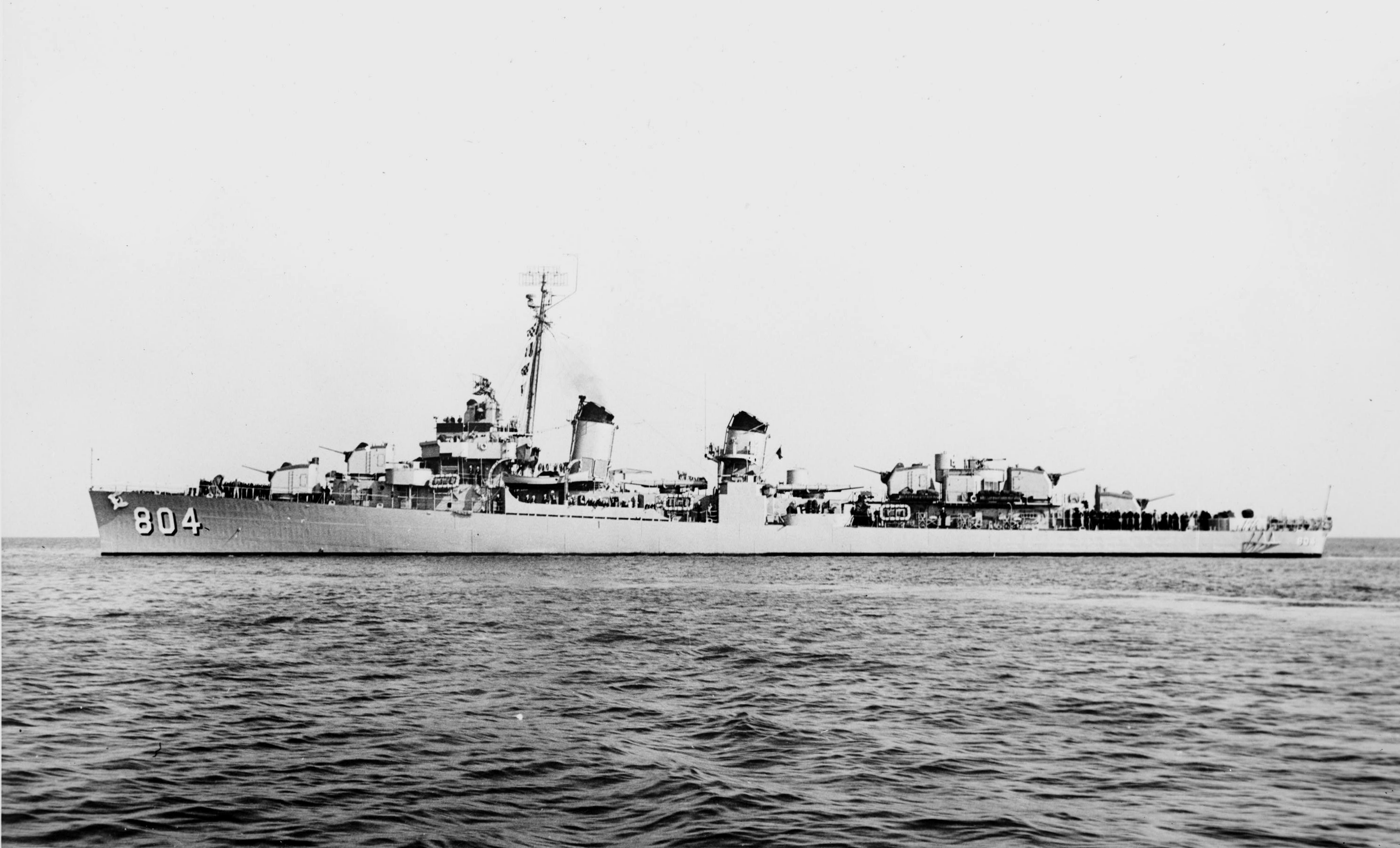
Rooks, in 1951.

Rooks recommissioned at San Diego on 19 May 1951 and after a brief tour of duty with the Pacific Fleet, transited the Panama Canal to join the Atlantic Fleet and Destroyer Squadron 20 (DesRon 20) at Newport, Rhode Island, on 13 October. During the next year she underwent training, particularly in ASW and completed a major overhaul. On 6 September 1952, Destroyer Squadron 20 departed the east coast of the United States for Korea where Rooks supported the U.N. effort by serving as escort and planeguard for the fast carrier task force, TF 77, and the U.N. Blockade and Escort Force, TF 95. She was most active in shore bombardment, shelling the North Korean ports of Songjin, Wonsan, and Chongjin. In February 1953 she got under way to return to Newport, Rhode Island, via the Indian Ocean, Mediterranean, and North Atlantic, reaching Newport, Rhode Island, 11 April.

At Newport, Rooks resumed operations with the 2d Fleet. During mid-1954 she underwent overhaul and from September to February 1955 she was deployed to the Mediterranean. On her return to the United States she served as afloat training ship for the students of the Destroyers, Atlantic Gunnery School, then with the summer, shifted to ASW and convoy exercises in which she was employed for the balance of the year.

During 1956 Rooks operated off the Atlantic coast and in the Caribbean. During December she served on the Atlantic barrier patrol, then, with the new year, 1957, resumed normal operations off the Atlantic coast, making two separate deployments to the Mediterranean, including one sortie into the Red Sea, by September 1958.

Following overhaul and further exercises off the Atlantic coast and in the Caribbean, Rooks again deployed to the Mediterranean until August 1959. During 1960 she conducted a 2-month midshipman cruise and made a deployment to the Arabian Sea, via the Mediterranean, for a combined CENTO exercise. During 1961 she underwent training in the Caribbean and Atlantic; then stood by, on station, for America's first crewed space shot, Freedom 7; conducted a midshipman cruise to Halifax; and participated in ASW operations in the northeast Atlantic, with calls at Portsmouth, England, and Rotterdam.

Rooks continued to operate with the Atlantic Fleet until 26 July 1962, when she was loaned to Chile under the Military Assistance Program.

=== Cochrane ===
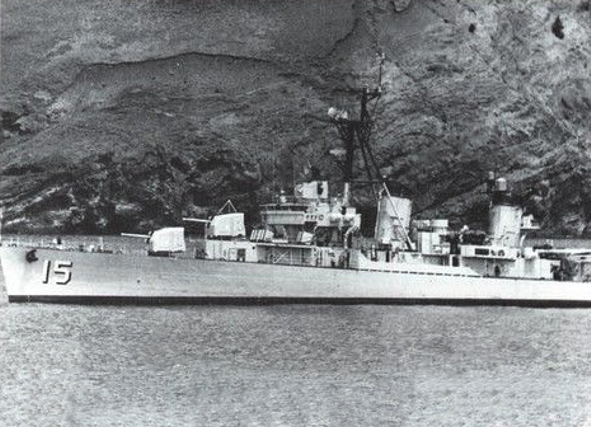
Cochrane (D-15) during the exercise UNITAS XV, in 1974.

The ship served in the Chilean Navy (Armada de Chile) as Cochrane (D-15), named after Admiral Thomas Cochrane (1775–1860), who commanded the Chilean navy (1817–1822).

She was in the Port of San Antonio during the 1973 Chilean coup d'etat, and was ultimately stricken and broken up for scrap in 1983.

== Awards ==
Rooks earned three battle stars for World War II services and two battle stars for service in the Korean War.
