= The United Travel Service =

American garage rock band

- Origin: Portland, Oregon, United States
- Genres: Garage rock; psychedelic rock
- Years active: 1966 - 1969
- Labels: Laurie
- Past members: John Reeves; Dale Sweetland; Benjamin Hoff; Ray Doern; John Carter; Jim Richards; Steve Bennett

The United Travel Service was an American garage rock band formed in Portland, Oregon, in 1966. The group gained recognition as outsiders, taking a musical route that separated them from the trends set in the region by the Sonics and the Fabulous Wailers. Though largely overlooked on a national level, the United Travel Service has become revered for two psychedelia-tinged singles.

== History ==
College student John Reeves (lead vocals, rhythm guitar), while studying at Oregon State University, formed the United Travel Service in late-1966 with the intention of bringing the San Francisco Sound to the Northwest. In order to accomplish this task, Reeves first sent advertisement flyers in search of band members, and recruited Dale Sweetland (drums, vocals) who signed on to the project after Reeves played the Grateful Dead's song, "Viola Lee Blues", to exemplify the future group's sound. Musicians Benjamin Hoff (bass guitar, vocals), and Jim Richards (lead guitar) joined soon thereafter. Prior to being known as the United Travel Service, the band played at one gig as the Virgin Forest; however, the performance was without Hoff and Richards.

The band first gained notoriety by performing around Portland, with a repertoire that included cover versions of the group's inspirations, San Francisco bands Jefferson Airplane and Quicksilver Messenger Service, the latter of which inspired the United Travel Service's moniker. However, over time, the group was more recognized for Hoff's unique folk-psychedelic rock originals. After establishing themselves on the local live circuit, the band signed with record producer Rick Keefer and sound engineer Ken Bass. They entered Keefer and Bass's home studio, and recorded the compositions "Wind and Fire"—with instrumentals marked by a raga-like guitar solo—and "Drummer of Your Mind", which is inspired by poet Henry David Thoreau's quote: “If a man does not keep pace with his companions, perhaps it is because he hears a different drummer”. The songs were coupled together on the United Travel Service's debut single, which was distributed on Laurie Records' subsidiary record labels Rust and Ridon Records. It became immensely popular regionally, charting at number three on Portland's KFLY radio station charts.

In 1968, the group released their second and final single, "Gypsy Eyes" (an original song with no relation to Jimi Hendrix's composition of the same name). It appeared the United Travel Service was nearing a national breakthrough as they commenced a tour with their idol band, Quicksilver Messenger Service, and were in preparation for a gig at the Fillmore West. However, the group mutually decided with Laurie Records—who were no longer going to seriously advertise the band—to void their recording contract, which left the two songs, "Snow" and "Slightest Possibility", unreleased. In addition, Reeves departed the United Travel Service in July 1969 to join the U.S. Air Force, leaving the band short-handed and consequently causing their disbandment later in the year.

After the group broke up, Hoff went on to be a successful author, writing such works like The Tao of Pooh. Over the years, the United Travel Service's material has appeared on numerous compilation albums, including Echoes in Time, Highs in the Mid-Sixties, Volume 16, Sixties Archives, Volume 5, and Psychedelic Moods, Part Two. In 2009, Break-A-Way Records released Wind and Stone, an album that features.the group's complete discography, both released and previously unissued. In 2009, Break-A-Way Records released Wind and Stone, an album that features.the group's complete discography, both released and previously unissued.
