= Albert H. Rooks =

United States Navy Medal of Honor recipient (1891–1942)

Albert Rooks
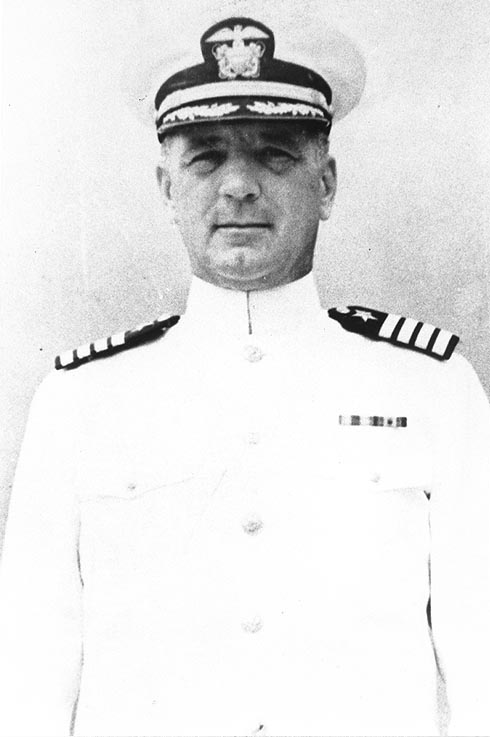
- Captain Albert H. Rooks, circa 1940–41
- Born: December 29, 1891; Colton, Washington, United States
- Died: March 1, 1942 (aged 50); Sunda Strait, Netherlands East Indies
- Burial place: At sea
- Military career
- Allegiance: United States
- Branch: United States Navy
- Service years: 1914–1942
- Rank: Captain
- Commands: USS Houston
- Conflicts: World War II: Battle of Makassar Strait; Battle of the Java Sea; Battle of Sunda Strait †
- Awards: Medal of Honor; Purple Heart; Knight 4th Class of the Military William Order (Netherlands)

Albert Harold Rooks (December 29, 1891 – March 1, 1942) was a captain in the United States Navy who posthumously received the Medal of Honor during World War II.

== Biography ==
Albert Harold Rooks was born in Colton, Washington, on December 29, 1891, to Albert Rooks (1859–1932) and Ruth Naomi Richardson (1871–1941). His younger brother was Major General Lowell Ward Rooks.

He entered the United States Naval Academy as a midshipman July 13, 1910, and was commissioned in the rank of ensign upon graduation on June 6, 1914. During the next seven years, among them the First World War years of 1917–18, he served in several ships, including USS West Virginia (ACR-5), USS St. Louis (C-20). He commanded the submarines USS Pike (SS-6), USS B-2 (SS-11), USS F-2 (SS-21), and USS H-4 (SS-147).

In 1921, Lieutenant Rooks joined the staff of the Twelfth Naval District, at San Francisco, California, remaining there until 1925, the year he was promoted to lieutenant commander. He next spent three years on board the battleship USS New Mexico (BB-40), followed by duty at the U.S. Naval Academy. In 1930, he helped commission the new cruiser USS Northampton (CA-26) and served on her until 1933, when he returned to the Naval Academy for a second tour.

In February 1936 Commander Rooks placed the new destroyer USS Phelps (DD-360) in commission and remained as her commanding officer until 1938. His next assignment was as a student at the Naval War College, and, upon completion of his studies, he served on that institution's staff. He was promoted to the rank of captain on July 1, 1940, while still at the War College. In 1941 Rooks took command of the heavy cruiser USS Houston (CA-30), flagship of the Asiatic Fleet. He took his ship through the painfully difficult first three months of the Pacific War, when the Asiatic Fleet and its British and Dutch counterparts fought desperately against an overwhelming Japanese onslaught into Southeast Asia, the Philippines and the East Indies. Both Houston and her commanding officer were lost in the Battle of Sunda Strait, on March 1, 1942.

Captain Rooks posthumously received the Medal of Honor for "extraordinary heroism, outstanding courage, gallantry in action and distinguished service in the line of his profession as Commanding Officer of the USS Houston during the period of 4 to February 27, 1942, while in action with superior Japanese enemy aerial and surface forces." During this period Houston survived six air attacks and one major naval engagement, doing considerable damage to the enemy while being heavily damaged herself in one air attack and in the naval engagement. Captain Rooks died on the bridge as a result of enemy-inflicted wounds and went down with his ship after her courageous fight against overwhelming odds.

== Namesake and honors ==
In 1944, the destroyer USS Rooks (DD-804) was named in honor of Captain Rooks.

The U.S. Army Corps of Engineers maintains Rooks Park, five miles east of Walla Walla, Washington, named in honor of Captain Rooks.

== Medal of Honor citation ==
Rank and organization: Captain, U.S. Navy. Born: December 29, 1891, Colton, Wash. Appointed from: Washington.

Citation:

for extraordinary heroism, outstanding courage, gallantry in action and distinguished service in the line of his profession, as commanding officer of the U.S.S. Houston during the period 4 to February 27, 1942, while in action with superior Japanese enemy aerial and surface forces. While proceeding to attack an enemy amphibious expedition, as a unit in a mixed force, Houston was heavily attacked by bombers; after evading 4 attacks, she was heavily hit in a fifth attack, lost 60 killed and had 1 turret wholly disabled. Capt. Rooks made his ship again seaworthy and sailed within 3 days to escort an important reinforcing convoy from Darwin to Koepang, Timor, Netherlands East Indies. While so engaged, another powerful air attack developed which by Houston's marked efficiency was fought off without much damage to the convoy. The commanding general of all forces in the area thereupon canceled the movement and Capt. Rooks escorted the convoy back to Darwin. Later, while in a considerable American-British-Dutch force engaged with an overwhelming force of Japanese surface ships, Houston with H.M.S. Exeter carried the brunt of the battle, and her fire alone heavily damaged 1 and possibly 2 heavy cruisers. Although heavily damaged in the actions, Capt. Rooks succeeded in disengaging his ship when the flag officer commanding broke off the action and got her safely away from the vicinity, whereas one-half of the cruisers were lost.

== See also ==
- Hector Waller
- List of Medal of Honor recipients for World War II
