= Lowell Ward Rooks =

United States Army officer

Major General Lowell Ward Rooks (April 11, 1893 − January 11, 1973) was an officer in the United States Army who commanded the 90th Infantry Division in 1945 and served with the Supreme Headquarters Allied Expeditionary Force at the end of World War II in Europe. He later served as Director General of the United Nations Relief and Rehabilitation Administration.

== Education and army career ==
Born in Colton, Washington, to Albert Rooks (1859–1932) and Ruth Naomi Richardson (1871–1941), Rooks attended Walla Walla High School before studying at Whitman College and later at Washington State College (1913−1914) and the University of Washington (1914−1917). His university studies were cut short by the American entry into World War I. He later studied at the Infantry School (1926−1927), the Command and General Staff College (1933−1935) and the Army War College (1936−1937).

Rooks rose through the ranks of the United States Army, serving overseas in World War I and on the Mexico–United States border. He was an instructor at the Infantry School from 1930 to 1933 and at the Command and General Staff College from 1937 to 1941. From 1941 to 1942 he served as chief of the ground forces training division of the Army War College. In June 1942 he became chief of staff of II Corps.

In December 1942 he joined the staff of General Eisenhower. He served at the North African campaign headquarters and in January 1944 was appointed deputy chief of staff of Allied Force Headquarters and took part in the Battle of the Bulge. He commanded the 90th Infantry Division briefly at the beginning of 1945. In March 1945 he was appointed to the Supreme Headquarters Allied Expeditionary Force (SHAEF), in which role he helped to dissolve the German supreme military command and the acting German government in May 1945, leading to the arrest of Admiral Dönitz.

== Post-war career and retirement ==
Rooks retired from the army in December 1945. He was chief executive officer of the United Nations Relief and Rehabilitation Administration in 1946, and from 1 January 1947 to 30 September 1948 he served as its third and final Director General, overseeing the agency's closure. He then worked as a fundraising coordinator for UNICEF until his resignation in November 1950.

He later moved to a cattle ranch in Arizona and died there, in Nogales, Arizona, in 1973. He was buried in Arlington National Cemetery.

== Honours ==
Rooks was awarded the American Distinguished Service Medal for the North African and Italian campaigns during World War II, the French Legion of Honour and Croix de Guerre, the Brazilian Order of Military Merit and the Belgian Order of the Crown.

== Family ==
Rooks was married to Martha C. Phillips (1901–1972), with whom he had two daughters.

Rooks's older brother Albert was a United States Navy officer who was killed at sea in 1942.

Military offices
Preceded by James Van Fleet	Commanding General 90th Infantry Division; 1945	Succeeded by Herbert L. Earnest
Non-profit organization positions
Preceded by Fiorello La Guardia	Director General of the United Nations Relief and Rehabilitation Administration; 1947−1948	Succeeded by Agency closed
