= The Te of Piglet =

1992 book by Benjamin Hoff

- Author: Benjamin Hoff
- Language: English
- Subject: Taoism, Philosophy
- Publisher: Dutton Books
- Publication date: 1992
- Pages: 257
- ISBN: 0-525-93496-0
- OCLC: 25413491
- Dewey Decimal: 299/.514 20
- LC Class: PR6025.I65 Z69 1992
- Preceded by: The Tao of Pooh

The Te of Piglet is a 1992 philosophical book written by Benjamin Hoff as a companion to his 1982 work The Tao of Pooh. The book was published by Dutton Books and spent 21 weeks on the Publishers Weekly Bestseller List and 40 weeks on the New York Times Bestseller List.

== Synopsis ==
In The Te of Piglet, the Piglet character of the Winnie-the-Pooh books explains the Chinese concept of Te, meaning 'power' or 'virtue'. Hoff elucidates the Taoist concept of 'Virtue—of the small'; though, he also uses it as an opportunity to elaborate on his introduction to Taoism. It is written with many embedded stories from the A. A. Milne Winnie the Pooh books, both for entertainment and because they serve as tools for explaining Taoism.

In the book Piglet is shown to possess great power—a common interpretation of the word Te, which more commonly means Virtue—not only because he is small, but also because he has a great heart or, to use a Taoist term, Tz'u. The book goes through the other characters—Tigger, Owl, Rabbit, Eeyore and Pooh—to show the various aspects of humanity that Taoism says get in the way of living in harmony with the Tao.

== Reception ==
The Palm Beach Post stated that although the first book was a "sleeper hit", the Te of Piglet "falls short as a companion to [the] Tao of Pooh". Princeton University's Cotsen Children's Library praised the book. Kirkus Reviews wrote "if you like marshmallow laced with arsenic, it was worth the wait". Publishers Weekly wrote "Hoff's tired attacks on the "Negative News Media" and on "Eeyore Amazons" who "call themselves feminists but ... don't like femininity" weaken his presentation, but on the whole, his Taoist manifesto distills ageless personal and political wisdom, relaying an ecological message we ignore at our peril."

== See also ==
- Pooh and the Philosophers
- The Tao of Pooh
- Benjamin Hoff
