= The Tao of Pooh =

1982 book by Benjamin Hoff

- Author: Benjamin Hoff
- Illustrator: Ernest H. Shepard
- Language: English
- Genre: Taoism, Philosophy
- Publisher: Dutton Books
- Publication date: 1982
- Pages: 158
- ISBN: 0-525-24458-1
- OCLC: 8031952
- Followed by: The Te of Piglet

The Tao of Pooh is a 1982 book written by Benjamin Hoff. The book is intended as an introduction to the Eastern belief system of Taoism for Westerners. It allegorically employs the fictional characters of A. A. Milne's Winnie-the-Pooh stories to explain the basic principles of philosophical Taoism. The book was on the New York Times bestseller list for 49 weeks. Hoff later wrote The Te of Piglet, a companion book.

== Background ==
Hoff wrote the book at night and on weekends while working as a tree pruner in the Portland Japanese Garden in Washington Park in Portland, Oregon.

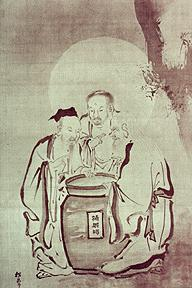
A traditional representation of "The Vinegar Tasters".

== Synopsis ==
The book starts with a description of the vinegar tasters, which is a painting portraying the three great eastern thinkers, Confucius, the Buddha, and Laozi over a vat of vinegar. Each tasting the vinegar of "life," Confucius finds it sour, the Buddha finds it bitter, but Laozi, the traditional founder of Taoism, finds it satisfying. Then the story unfolds backing up this analogy.

Hoff presents Winnie-the-Pooh and related others from A. A. Milne's stories as characters that interact with him while he writes The Tao of Pooh, but also quotes excerpts of their tales from Milne's actual books Winnie-the-Pooh and The House at Pooh Corner, in order to exemplify his points to the reader and the characters. Hoff uses many of Milne's characters to symbolize ideas that differ from or accentuate Taoist tenets. Winnie-the-Pooh himself, for example, personifies the principles of wu wei, the Taoist concept of "effortless doing," and pu, the concept of being open to, but unburdened by, experience, and it is also a metaphor for natural human nature. In contrast, characters like Owl and Rabbit over-complicate problems, often over-thinking to the point of confusion, and Eeyore pessimistically complains and frets about existence, unable to just be. Hoff regards Pooh's simpleminded nature, unsophisticated worldview and instinctive problem-solving methods as conveniently representative of the Taoist philosophical foundation. The book also incorporates translated excerpts from various prominent Taoist texts, from authors such as Laozi and Zhuang Zhou. However, one poem included in the book attributed to Lu Yu of the Tang Dynasty was actually written by Song Dynasty poet Lu You.

== Reception ==
The book was on the New York Times bestseller list for 49 weeks.

It has been used as required reading in certain college courses.

== Copyright recapturing ==
In April 2018, Hoff wrote a letter to his publisher informing them that he planned to recapture the copyright for The Tao of Pooh on December 15, 2018. He cited revised U.S. copyright law and explained that his reasoning for wanting to recapture the copyright was what he deemed general mistreatment by the publisher and a lack of acknowledgement of his accomplishments by them. He was able to successfully recapture the copyright. Hoff published all of the correspondence about this process on his personal website.

== Table of contents ==
1. Foreword
2. The How of Pooh? (p. 1)
3. The Tao of Who? (p. 9)
4. Spelling Tuesday (p. 23)
5. Cottleston Pie (p. 37)
6. The Pooh Way (p. 67)
7. Bisy Backson (p. 91)
8. That Sort of Bear (p. 115)
9. Nowhere and Nothing (p. 141) Ap
10. The Now of Pooh (p. 153)
11. Backword (p. 157)

== See also ==
- The Te of Piglet
- Pooh and the Philosophers
