= Pooh and the Philosophers =

1995 book by John Tyerman Williams

- Author: John Tyerman Williams
- Publisher: Dutton Books
- Publication date: 1995

Pooh and the Philosophers is a 1995 book by John Tyerman Williams, purporting to show how all of Western philosophy from the last 3,000 years was a long preparation for Winnie the Pooh. It was published in 1995 by Dutton in the United States and by Methuen in the United Kingdom, using A. A. Milne's fictional bear Winnie-the-Pooh, and is intended to be both humorous and intellectual.

== Authorship and content ==
J. T. Williams explains a number of philosophical theories using many different Milne quotation, such as René Descartes's "I think therefore I am," and distills them down to a very simple level. Williams was a retired schoolteacher of English and history with a Ph.D in philosophy. He died in 2016.

== Related works ==
- Pooh and the Magicians (originally Pooh and the Ancient Mysteries)
- Pooh and the Psychologists

== See also ==
- The Tao of Pooh
- The Te of Piglet
