= Benjamin Hoff =

American author (born 1946)

Benjamin Hoff (born on November 11, 1946) is an American author. He is best known as the author of The Tao of Pooh (1982) and The Te of Piglet (1992). In 2006, he denounced the publishing industry and announced his resignation from book-writing. His book, The Singing Creek Where the Willows Grow, won the American Book Award in 1988.

== Personal life ==
Hoff grew up in the Portland, Oregon neighborhood of Sylvan, where he acquired a fondness of the natural world that has been highly influential in his writing. He attended elementary and middle school in Sylvan and attended both Benson Polytechnic High School and Lincoln High School in Portland. Hoff attended college at the University of Oregon in Eugene and the Portland Museum Art School (now the Pacific Northwest College of Art). Hoff obtained a B.A. in Asian Art from The Evergreen State College in Olympia, Washington, in 1973.

Hoff has also studied architecture, music, fine arts, graphic design and Asian Culture. His studies in Asian Culture included reaching the certificate level in the Japanese Tea Ceremony. He had two years of apprenticeship in Japanese fine-tuning methods and four years of instruction in the martial art form of tai chi, including a year of qigong. Prior to his career in writing, he worked as a tree pruner, antiques restorer, hospital orderly, investigative reporter, photojournalist, recording musician, singer, and songwriter. In the 1960s, Hoff helped form the rock–pop band the United Travel Service. In his spare time, he practices Taoist qigong and tai chi. He enjoys playing classical guitar, composing music and taking nature photographs.

In 2006, Hoff published an essay on his website titled "Farewell to Authorship", in which he denounced the publishing industry and announced his resignation from book-writing. This is the only website he has officially endorsed or been involved with. As of August 2010 the website displayed a series of letters sent between Hoff and staffers from the Oregon Historical Society, where Hoff criticizes the OHS-produced Oregon Experience: Opal Whiteley, saying that many of the facts were ignored or untrue. Hoff wrote the 1986 book The Singing Creek Where the Willows Grow, a biography about Opal Whiteley which also includes her diary.

== Books ==
Benjamin Hoff has written five books: "The Way to Life" (1981), "The House on the Point" (2002), "The Singing Creek Where the Willows Grow" (1986), The Tao of Pooh (1982), and The Te of Piglet (1992). The Tao of Pooh and its successor, "The Te of Piglet" are Hoff's best known books. They discuss Taoist beliefs and writings through Winnie-the-Pooh. "The Singing Creek Where the Willows Grow" is a biography of Opal Whiteley, another American author from Oregon.

== Awards and commendations ==
Hoff was awarded the American Book Award in 1988 for The Singing Creek Where the Willows Grow: The Rediscovered Diary of Opal Whiteley. The Tao of Pooh, The Te of Piglet, and The Singing Creek Where the Willows Grow were all book-of-the-month choices. The Tao of Pooh and The Te of Piglet were also chosen by the Quality Paperback Book Club. The Tao of Pooh was an international bestseller and spent 49 weeks on The New York Times' bestseller list. The Te of Piglet also became an international bestseller and spent 40 weeks on The New York Times' bestseller list.

== Bibliography ==
- 1981 The Way to Life (Weatherhill)
- 1982 The Tao of Pooh (Dutton)
- 1986 The Singing Creek Where the Willows Grow (Houghton Mifflin)
- 1993 The Te of Piglet (Dutton)
- 2002 The House on the Point (Minotaur Books)
- 2021 The Eternal Tao Te Ching (Harry N. Abrams)
