= Opal Whiteley =

American nature writer and diarist (1897–1992)

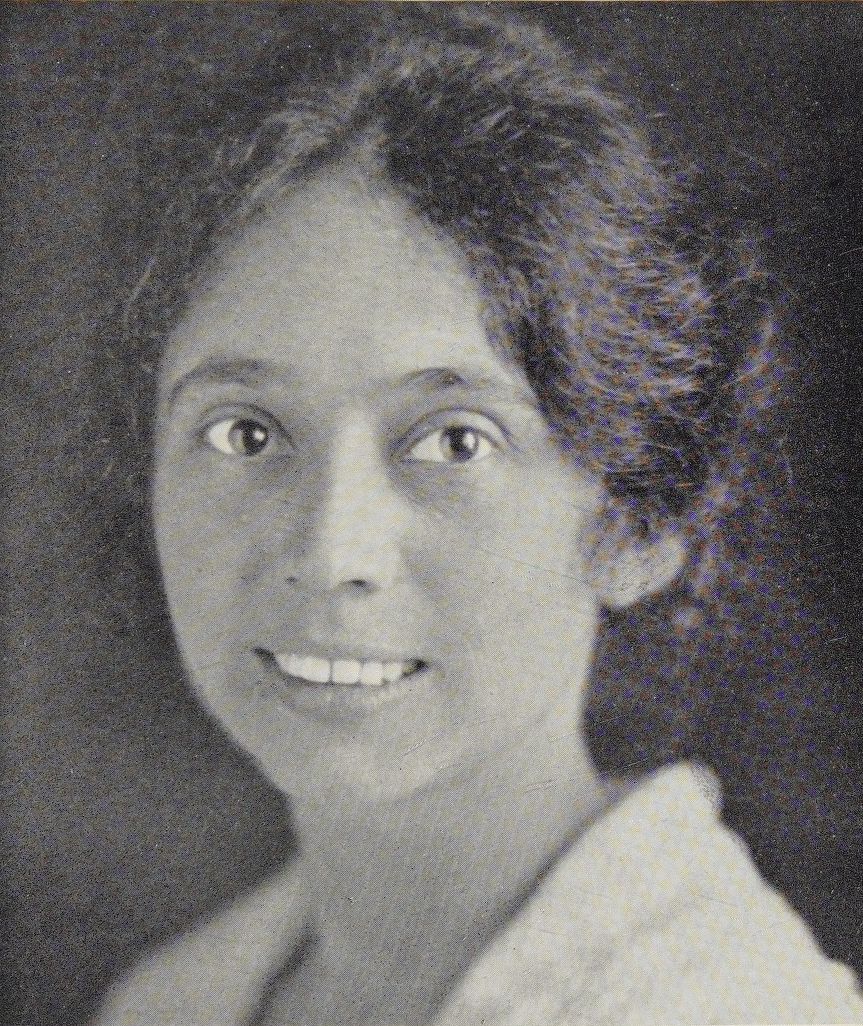
- Opal Whiteley in 1919
- Born: Opal Irene Whiteley; December 11, 1897; Colton, Washington, U.S.
- Died: February 16, 1992 (aged 94); London, England
- Resting place: Highgate Cemetery
- Other name: Françoise Marie de Bourbon-Orléans
- Education: University of Oregon
- Occupations: Naturalist, diarist
- Years active: 1916–1948
- Notable work: The Story of Opal: The Journal of an Understanding Heart (1920)

Opal Irene Whiteley (December 11, 1897 – February 16, 1992) was an American nature writer and diarist who gained international fame for the publication of her childhood diary, which featured meditations and observations of nature and wildlife. Raised in logging camps in rural Oregon, Whiteley was considered by some a child prodigy, and expressed intense interest in both writing and science in her youth. As an adolescent, she began tutoring and holding lectures on natural history and geology in her community, earning a reputation as an amateur naturalist, as well as becoming a noted speaker for the Young People's Society of Christian Endeavour.

While attending the University of Oregon, Whiteley toured the state giving lectures on nature and the environment. In 1918, she self-published The Fairyland Around Us, which combined factual scientific information along with mystical observations of nature. In 1919, she traveled to Boston to seek wider distribution of the book; there she met Atlantic Monthly publisher Ellery Sedgwick, who instead suggested that she publish her childhood diary, the fragments of which she had kept stored since her youth. Over a series of months, Whiteley meticulously reassembled the diary, which was first released in serial form in the Atlantic Monthly in March 1920. It was published in book format in September 1920 under the title The Story of Opal: The Journal of an Understanding Heart. The publication of the diary earned Whiteley international fame, though it was widely speculated that she had actually written the work as an adult.

Throughout her life, Whiteley claimed to have been the biological daughter of French naturalist Henri, Prince of Orléans, who died during an expedition in India in 1901, after which she was allegedly sent to Oregon and adopted. She frequently went by the name Françoise Marie de Bourbon-Orléans, in reference to her alleged father. The details surrounding her family history have been the subject of wide speculation, with several biographers attributing the claims to delusions stemming from mental illness. Following the publication of her diary, Whiteley relocated to England, where she was eventually committed to a psychiatric hospital in 1948. She spent the remainder of her life in psychiatric care until her death in 1992 at Napsbury Hospital in Hertfordshire.

In 1986, writer Benjamin Hoff published The Singing Creek where the Willows Grow: The Rediscovered Diary of Opal Whiteley, a biography accompanying her full diary; this won the National Book Award in 1988. The diary itself has been republished in several other editions, and Whiteley's life story has been adapted in film and theater productions.

== Biography ==
=== Early life and writings (1897–1915) ===
Opal Irene Whiteley was born December 11, 1897, in Colton, Washington, the first of five children of Charles Edward and Lizzie Whiteley. Charles was of French Canadian ancestry. Beginning in childhood, Whiteley apocryphally claimed to be the daughter of French naturalist Henri, Prince of Orléans, and an unnamed Austrian duchess. By Whiteley's account, she was taken to Oregon in 1904 and brought to a lumber camp, where she was adopted by the Whiteleys, whom she claimed were in fact not her biological parents. In reference to her alleged father, Whiteley frequently went by the name Françoise Marie de Bourbon-Orléans throughout her life.

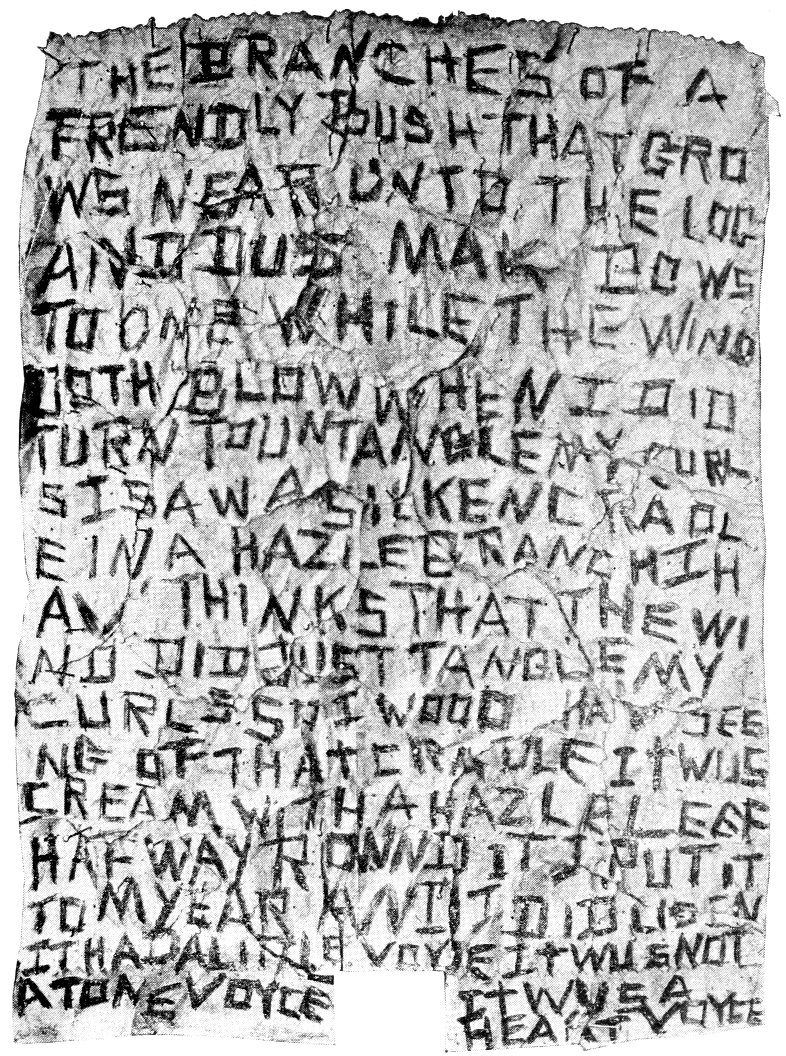
Excerpt of Whiteley's diary, composed with crayon on a paper bag

In 1903, after having spent almost a year in Wendling, Oregon, the Whiteley family moved to Walden, near the town of Cottage Grove, where Opal was raised largely in poverty. Beginning at age six, she began writing a personal diary in which she observed the animals and natural world around her, sometimes using crayons, and utilizing her own phonetic form of spelling. Whiteley was noted by her teachers and family members as a voracious reader who spent much of her time reading and writing.

Whiteley claimed that her mother often disciplined her with severe corporal punishment. Her grandmother, Mary Ann Scott, supported this claim, stating that Opal's mother frequently beat Opal for "looking at nothing with big eyes ... inattention and absentmindedness." According to Whiteley and her grandmother, as a child Whiteley was usually punished for daydreaming and "meditations", for running away to go on "explores" instead of working, for misguided attempts to help around the house that ended in disaster, and especially the time and effort she spent on caring for the animals around the lumber camp. She had a great many animal friends, both wild and domestic, to whom she gave fanciful names derived from her readings in classical literature. Despite her troubles, Whiteley wrote of her childhood as though she had often been very happy: even after a severe beating, she could write: "I'm real glad I'm alive."

Whiteley was thought to have been a child prodigy who was able to memorize and categorize vast amounts of information on plants and animals. One of her schoolteachers, Lily Black, felt that she was a genius; she was two grades ahead of her age in school, and Black took advantage of the then-new interlibrary loan system to get books for Whiteley from the Oregon State Library.

At age eight, Whiteley joined the Young People's Society of Christian Endeavour, a fundamentalist group that encouraged "social growth and spiritual awareness" in rural communities. Her studies of the environment led her to become a noted amateur naturalist in the community, and she began leading lectures at age thirteen in which she educated locals on geology, natural history, animals, insects, and plants, garnering the nickname the "Sunshine Fairy" among locals. She concurrently became a leader of the local chapter of the Junior Christian Endeavor and gave talks in Portland; one attendee there recounted that she "spoke about God being everywhere, and how every little creature, plant, and tree in the woods bore testimony to His presence."

=== Academics and The Fairyland Around Us (1915–1919) ===
By age seventeen, Whiteley had been elected as the state superintendent of the Young People's Society of Christian Endeavor, and her lectures on nature led to Cottage Grove Sentinel editor Elbert Bede writing a series of articles about her in 1915. Following a well-received speaking engagement for the Junior Christian Endeavor in Eugene, Whiteley visited the University of Oregon, where a professor of geology noted that she knew "more about geology than do many students that have graduated from my department." This led to the university offering her acceptance into their science program, in which she enrolled in the fall of 1916. In the spring of her freshman year, she was offered to speak at the July 1917 national Christian Endeavor event in New York City, but did not attend owing to her mother's death from breast cancer in May 1917, which was shortly followed by her grandfather's death.

Whiteley continued to pursue her studies, but after a series of incomplete grades in her courses, she lost an academic scholarship that supported her ability to attend. She spent the summer of 1917 touring the state and giving nature lectures in an effort to earn money for her tuition, and resumed her studies in the fall of that year. During this period, she resided alone in a small house near the university campus, which she had filled with "an estimated sixteen thousand specimens of natural history." She concurrently developed an interest in genealogy during this time, and changed her middle name from Irene to Stanley after discovering an ancestor who bore this name. During her sophomore year, she started the Phusis Philoi (Greek: Nature Lovers) club at the university for young women interested in science and natural history. Whiteley stated she ultimately had the goal of opening a museum in the area.

In the spring of 1918, shortly after making her museum announcement to the public, Whiteley promptly left Oregon, traveling to Los Angeles with the intention of earning money through lectures to finance its plans. In California, she held numerous lectures for children, which she entitled "The Fairyland Around Us". By June 1918, she began writing a book of the same title, which blended recollections of her lectures with observations on plant and animal life, with photographs of animals as well as her students, along with hand-drawn images. She also incorporated snippets of her childhood diary in the book.

Publication efforts for The Fairyland Around Us began in December 1918, but its initial planned release never reached fruition as Whiteley ran out of funding to support it, largely due to her frequent requests for changes during the publishing process. This resulted in the publishers scrapping the project and destroying the plates for its illustrations, which emotionally devastated her and left her suicidal. Describing the book's manuscript, biographer Benjamin Hoff notes: "Like her other writings, it balanced seriousness with humor, scientific scrutiny with mysticism, and information with emotion."

Several months later, after regaining her health, Whiteley continued to pursue the project, eventually accruing enough funds to self-publish The Fairyland Around Us in a run of approximately 200–300 copies, featuring hand-pasted drawings and postcards in place of the plate illustrations that had been destroyed. Copies of The Fairyland Around Us were distributed on a subscription basis, and earned Whiteley praise from Theodore Roosevelt, William Howard Taft, and Kate Douglas Wiggin, who sent her letters of appreciation.

=== Publication of diaries and fame (1920–1923) ===
I have read with interest a number of comments on The Story of Opal ... which not merely cry out that this remarkable testament of a child's heart must be tinctured with fraud but which deplore its 'sentimentalism' and even point to it as one more instance of the amazing American appetite for mush ... But that it is a beautiful and touching and piercingly honest revelation of an imaginative child's spirit seems to me evidently beyond cavil.

— Christopher Morley, quoted in a 1921 The Atlantic Monthly advertisement.

At the encouragement of friends, Whiteley traveled to the East Coast in July 1919, hoping to find a publisher there to publish her work. In September 1919, she visited the offices of Ellery Sedgwick, publisher of the Atlantic Monthly. By some accounts, Sedgwick initially declined to publish the book, but, after interviewing Whiteley and finding her recounting of her life story intriguing, inquired if she had documented it in a diary. Whiteley indicated that she had, but that the diary was largely tattered (which she attributed to her sisters' destruction of it throughout her childhood) and had been kept in storage in Los Angeles.

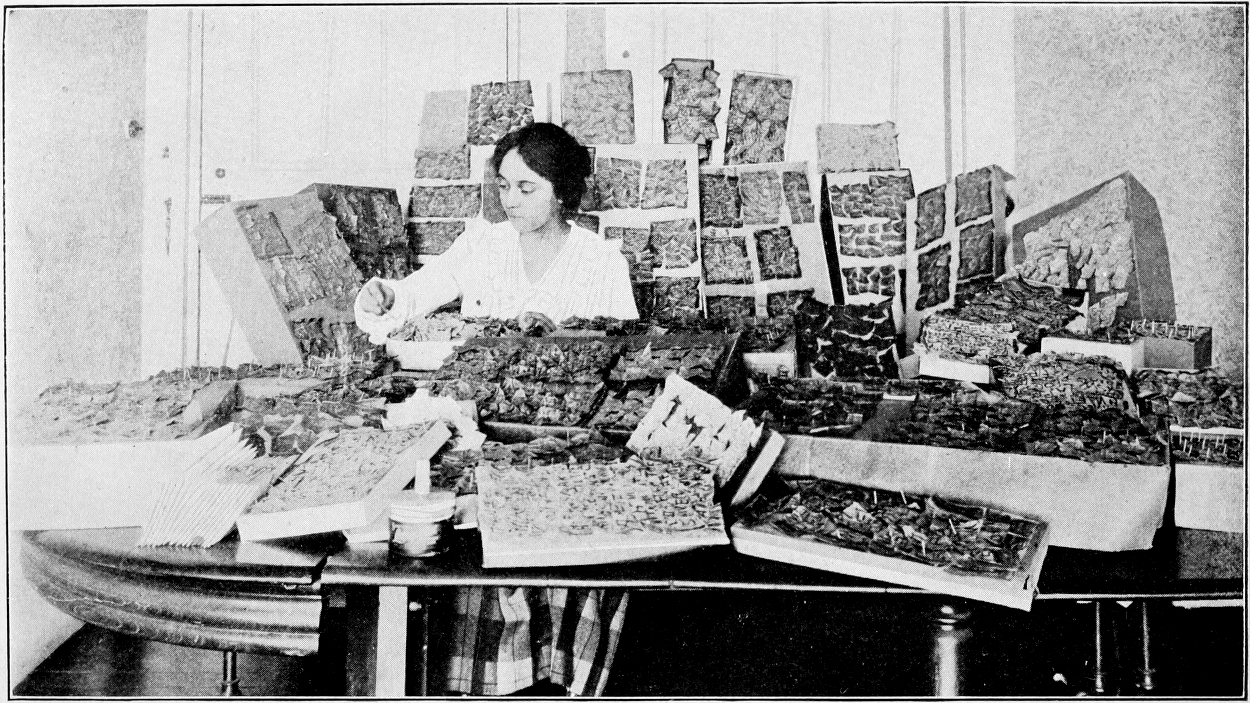
Whiteley reconstructing her diary, c. 1920

Sedgwick requested that Whiteley have the papers sent to Boston. The fragmented papers soon arrived, "crammed in a hatbox." Sedgwick, who felt the diary would prove a viable literary work, arranged for Whiteley to reside in his mother-in-law's Brookline home, where she spent the following nine months methodically reassembling the work. The diary was apparently block-printed in crayon and phonetically spelled on various types of paper. According to Sedgwick's account of the reconstruction, it was a laborious undertaking, as many of the torn pieces were only large enough to contain a single letter and the pieces had been stored in Whiteley's hat box for years.

The first serialized installment of Whiteley's diary was published by the Atlantic Monthly in March 1920, branded as "a revelation of the spirit of childhood." It became a swift success with readers, garnering the publication a significant influx of new subscribers. Based on its success as a serial, the Atlantic Monthly published the full work in book form as The Story of Opal: The Journey of an Understanding Heart. Photos that initially appeared in the book showed Whiteley at work on the reconstruction, along with pictures of two of the original diary pages.

Shortly after the publication of Whiteley's diary, speculation grew among the public regarding its authenticity, with many believing the work had been written by Whiteley as an adult. The diary also resulted in strife between Whiteley and her family due to its unflattering depiction of them, suggesting they were abusive to her, as well as for Whiteley's claims that they were not her biological relatives. Her siblings, frequently harassed by journalists, relocated and changed their names to avoid public scrutiny.

=== Subsequent works, relocation to England (1924–1947) ===
After the publication of her diary, Whiteley self-published a book of poetry entitled The Flower of Stars in 1923. However, being ill-equipped to handle the public notoriety garnered by her diary's publication, Whiteley left the United States and traveled to India in the 1920s, as her alleged father, Henri, Prince of Orléans, had done: She was the guest of the Maharaja of Udaipur, and wrote several articles about India for British magazines. Her presence caused some trouble with the British government in India, especially when a local cleric fell in love with her. Leaving India, she eventually settled in London.

=== Later life and death (1948–1992) ===
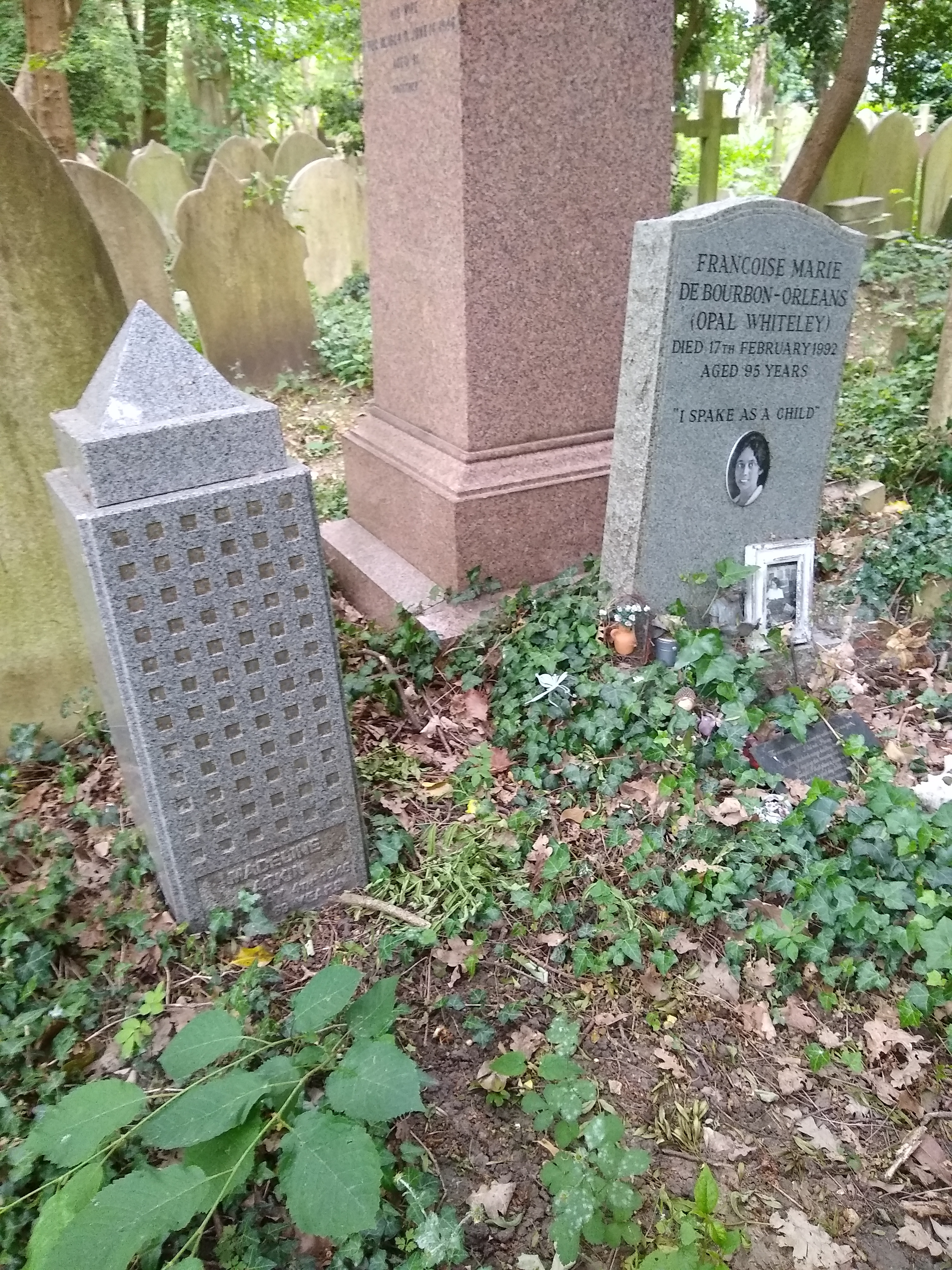
Whiteley's grave in Highgate Cemetery

In her later years in England, Whiteley grew increasingly mentally disturbed, and often lived in dire poverty. In 1948, English authorities found her residing in a squalid basement apartment, surrounded by thousands of books. She was committed to London's Napsbury Hospital, where she became known to the staff of Napsbury as "the Princess". Whiteley remained at Napsbury until her death in 1992.

Whiteley was buried at Highgate Cemetery, where her gravestone bears both her names with the inscription "I spake as a child".

== Controversies ==
=== Authenticity of diary ===
Public dispute over the authenticity of Whiteley's diary began shortly after its serialization, with many readers alleging she had actually written the diary at age 20, and not when she was a child. Whiteley's publisher Ellery Sedgwick contended this, stating that it was "unquestionably the work of a child," and asserting its authenticity in correspondence to The Oregonian in 1920. According to biographer Kathrine Beck, correspondence preserved by the Massachusetts Historical Society from Whiteley to Sedgwick proves that Sedgwick was at least aware of the existence of her diary prior to their meeting, suggesting that he may have partially invented the tale of how the diary came to his attention (he claimed to have learned of it through an organic discussion during their first encounter with one another).

Biographer Benjamin Hoff supports the notion that Whiteley wrote the diary as a child, based on the premise that it would have been an extraordinarily elaborate deception for the adult Whiteley to first create a diary as a child might have printed it, then tear it up, store it and reassemble it for Sedgwick and the Atlantic Monthly. Furthermore, Hoff indicated that he had examined some of the few remaining diary pages and that chemical tests suggested that the crayons and paper had been manufactured prior to World War I. This claim was initially made in Opal Whiteley, The Unsolved Mystery by Elizabeth Lawrence, in which she noted that she had had the diary pages submitted for scientific scrutiny.

Historian Jennifer Chambers writes in Remarkable Oregon Women: Revolutionaries & Visionaries (2015) that "opinions differ widely" on the diary's origins, and that "whole books and dissertations have been written positing theories going both ways."

=== Parentage ===
Whiteley's claims about her family history have also been the subject of public debate, with a number of historians claiming that mental illness led her to engage in delusional fantasies about her "true" parents. Commenting in 1986 on her claims of being the daughter of Henri, Prince of Orléans, Hoff said: "After three years of intensive research, I found no evidence that she is anyone other than the daughter of Edward and Elizabeth Whiteley. The fact is, the proof is overwhelming that the Whiteleys are her natural parents." Hoff cites Whiteley's alternate account of her parentage as evidence of latent mental illness, and the fantasies rooted in her childhood fascination with India, where Henri, Prince of Orléans died during a 1901 expedition. Hoff asserts that Whiteley's mental illness was responsible for the ruinous circumstances that recurred throughout her life:

When little Opal said the animals and flowers talked to her, people thought that she was lying. Years later, when she refused to acknowledge that her childhood adoption story was a fantasy, readers and critics concluded she was trying to deceive them. All her life, in one way or another — with spankings or scoldings, criticisms or rejections — she was punished for having schizophrenia.

However, G. Evert Baker, an attorney and leader of the Young People's Society of Christian Endeavour in Portland of which Whiteley became a member in her youth, supported Whiteley's claim that she had in fact been adopted:

When I first read of the doubt concerning Opal's parentage ... I thought nothing of it, as I assumed members of the family would straighten out this doubt within a short time. But now it appears that they deny Opal was a foster child. After the meeting I went to the Whiteley home and tailed with Mrs. Whiteley for some time, because Opal had attracted my attention throughout the meeting, and she stood out above all others in the room. Mrs. Whiteley then told me that Opal was an orphan; that the little girl was not her own daughter. As I now recall it, she said her own daughter had died some years before and she had taken Opal into the family to replace the little daughter whom she had buried. I know she said Opal's father was dead, although I am not absolutely certain concerning the father.

== Preservation of materials ==
Contemporarily, only several original copies of Whiteley's The Fairyland Around Us (1918) are extant; one copy is held by the University of Oregon in their archive of Whiteley's papers, which also includes personal correspondence, photographs, classroom and literary notes, newspaper clippings, pamphlets, and materials related to Whiteley's involvement with the Christian Endeavor society. Various correspondence written by Whiteley during her later years in England is held by the University of London.

Though the U.S. copyright of Whiteley's diary has lapsed, the international copyright is still extant and is held by the library of the University of London. The full dramatic rights to the diary are held by Robert Lindsey-Nassif, author of the off-Broadway musical Opal.

== Diary adaptations ==
=== Literary ===
The diary was reprinted in 1962, with a lengthy foreword by E. S. Bradburne (Elizabeth Lawrence), as Opal Whiteley, the Unsolved Mystery. Lawrence's version has been reissued in an expanded edition as Opal Whiteley, the Mystery Continues.

The diary was reprinted in 1986, accompanied by a biography and foreword by Benjamin Hoff; and again, with a new afterword, in 1994. Hoff's reprint of the journal contains a detailed account of his research into Whiteley's life and the origins of her diary, and supplies evidence that concludes that the diary was authentically created in childhood, though he indicates that he disbelieves Whiteley's claims of her adoption.

In 1984, an adaptation of her diary was published by Jane Boulton as Opal: The Journal of an Understanding Heart.

Children's author and illustrator Barbara Cooney published "Only Opal: The Diary of a Young Girl," using text from Jane Boulton's "Opal: The Journal of an Understanding Heart," in 1994, via Philomel Books, a division of The Putnam & Grosset Group.

=== Film and theater ===
The diary was adapted by Robert Lindsey-Nassif into the off-Broadway musical Opal, opening in New York in 1992, published by Samuel French, Inc.

British journalist Melanie McFadyean made Who Was Opal?, a 30-minute BBC Radio 4 documentary program, produced by Bob Dickinson and first broadcast on 5 January 2010, which also aired on 26 April 2024.

In March 2010, Oregon Public Broadcasting aired an in-house documentary, Oregon Experience: Opal Whiteley.

Opal, a narrative feature film inspired by the life of Opal Whiteley and directed by Dina Ciraulo, premiered in the 2010 Mill Valley Film Festival. It had a week-long theatrical run at the Bijou Art Cinemas in Eugene, Oregon. The self-funded film won several awards.

In Jerry Rust's 2011 novel, The Covered Bridge Murders, Opal Whiteley is featured as a character in the plot.

== Sources ==
- Beck, Kathrine (2003). Opal: A Life of Enchantment, Mystery, and Madness. New York City, New York: Penguin. ISBN 978-0-143-03429-2.
- Chambers, Jennifer (2015). Remarkable Oregon Women: Revolutionaries & Visionaries. Mount Pleasant, South Carolina: Arcadia Publishing. ISBN 978-1-625-85644-9.
- Hoff, Benjamin; Whiteley, Opal (1986). The Singing Creek Where the Willows Grow: The Rediscovered Diary of Opal Whiteley. New York City, New York: Ticknor & Fields. ISBN 978-0-091-72734-5.
- Thoele, Michael (1998). Bohemia: The Lives and Times of an Oregon Timber Venture. Portland, Oregon: Oregon Historical Society Press. ISBN 978-0-875-95268-0.
