= USS Houston (CA-30) =

Northampton-class heavy cruiser of the United States Navy

Coordinates: 5°48′45″S 106°7′55″E

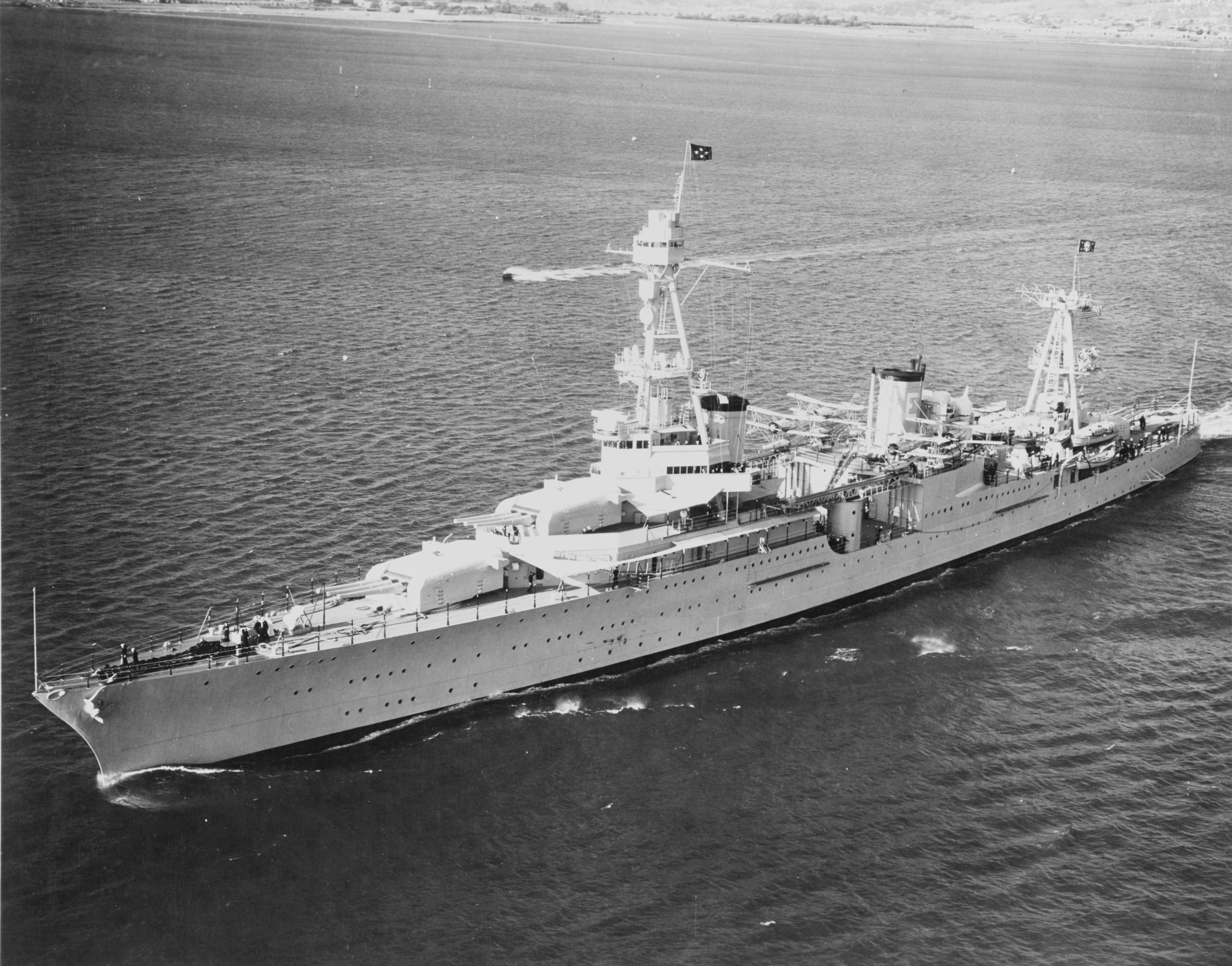
- Houston off San Diego in October 1935

History

United States
- Name: Houston
- Namesake: City of Houston, Texas
- Ordered: 18 December 1924
- Awarded: 13 June 1927
- Builder: Newport News Shipbuilding, Newport News, Virginia
- Cost: $10,567,000 (contract price)
- Laid down: 1 May 1928
- Launched: 7 September 1929
- Sponsored by: Miss Elizabeth Holcombe
- Commissioned: 17 June 1930
- Reclassified: CA-30, 1 July 1931
- Identification: Hull symbol: CL-30; Hull symbol: CA-30; Code letters: NIQF
- Nickname(s): "Huey-Maru", "The Rambler", "Galloping Ghost of the Java Coast"
- Honors and awards: 2 × battle stars; 1 × Presidential Unit Citation
- Fate: Sunk in the Battle of Sunda Strait, 1 March 1942

General characteristics (as built)
- Class & type: Northampton-class cruiser
- Displacement: 9,050 long tons (9,195 t) (standard)
- Length: 600 ft 3 in (182.96 m) oa; 569 ft (173 m) pp
- Beam: 66 ft 1 in (20.14 m)
- Draft: 16 ft 4 in (4.98 m) (mean); 23 ft (7.0 m) (max)
- Installed power: 8 × White-Forster boilers; 107,000 shp (80,000 kW)
- Propulsion: 4 × Parsons reduction steam turbines, Curtis cruising gears; 4 × screws
- Speed: 32.7 kn (37.6 mph; 60.6 km/h)
- Range: 10,000 nmi (12,000 mi; 19,000 km) at 15 kn (17 mph; 28 km/h)
- Capacity: 1,500 short tons (1,400 t) fuel oil
- Complement: 109 officers 676 enlisted
- Armament: 9 × 8 in (203 mm)/55 caliber guns (3×3); 4 × 5 in (127 mm)/25 caliber anti-aircraft guns; 16 × 1.1 inch (28 mm)/75 caliber anti-aircraft guns in four quad mounts; 2 × 3-pounder 47 mm (1.9 in) saluting guns; 6 × 21 in (533 mm) torpedo tubes. Torpedo battery removed by the mid-Thirties.
- Armor: Belt: 3–3 3/4 in (76–95 mm); Deck: 1–2 in (25–51 mm); Barbettes: 1 1/2 in (38 mm); Turrets: 3/4–2 1/2 in (19–64 mm); Conning Tower: At least 3 inches.
- Aircraft carried: 4 × SOC Seagull scout-observation floatplanes
- Aviation facilities: 2 × Amidship catapults

General characteristics (1942)
- Armament: 9 × 8 in (203 mm)/55 caliber guns (3x3); 8 × 5 in (127 mm)/25 caliber anti-aircraft guns; 2 × 3-pounder 47 mm (1.9 in) saluting guns; 16 × 1.1 in (27.9 mm)/75 anti-aircraft guns in four quad mounts.; 8 × .50 in (12.7 mm) machine guns

USS Houston (CL/CA-30), was a Northampton-class cruiser of the United States Navy. She was the second Navy ship to bear the name "Houston".

She was launched by Newport News Shipbuilding & Dry Dock Company, Newport News, Virginia, on 7 September 1929, sponsored by Elizabeth Holcombe (daughter of Oscar Holcombe, ex-mayor of Houston, Texas). Elizabeth was chaperoned by Mary Ellen Bute and Charlotte Williams (great grand-daughter of Sam Houston). Houston was commissioned on 17 June 1930.

The ship was originally classified as a light cruiser (hull number CL-30). Houston was redesignated a heavy cruiser (CA-30) on 1 July 1931, as the provisions of the 1930 London Naval Treaty classified ships with 8-inch (20.3 cm) main battery guns as heavy cruisers.

== Inter-war period ==
After conducting a shakedown cruise in the Atlantic, Houston returned to the United States in October 1930. She then visited her namesake city from 25 October until 31 October, hosting over 40,000 visitors to the ship. On 28 October a parade held for the ship & crew in downtown Houston saw over 100,000 persons in attendance. Houston joined the fleet at Hampton Roads. Steaming to New York, the cruiser departed on 10 January 1931 for the Pacific, and after transiting the Panama Canal and the Hawaiian Islands, arrived at Manila on 22 February. Houston became flagship of the Asiatic Fleet upon arrival, and for the next year participated in training operations in the Far East.

With the outbreak of war between China and Japan in late 1931, Houston got underway on 31 January for Shanghai to protect American interests. She landed Marine and Navy gun platoons to help stabilize the situation and remained in the area, with the exception of a good will cruise to the Philippines in March and one to Japan in May 1933, until being relieved by Augusta on 17 November 1933. The cruiser sailed to San Francisco to join the Scouting Force, and for the years preceding World War II participated in Fleet Problems and maneuvers in the Pacific.

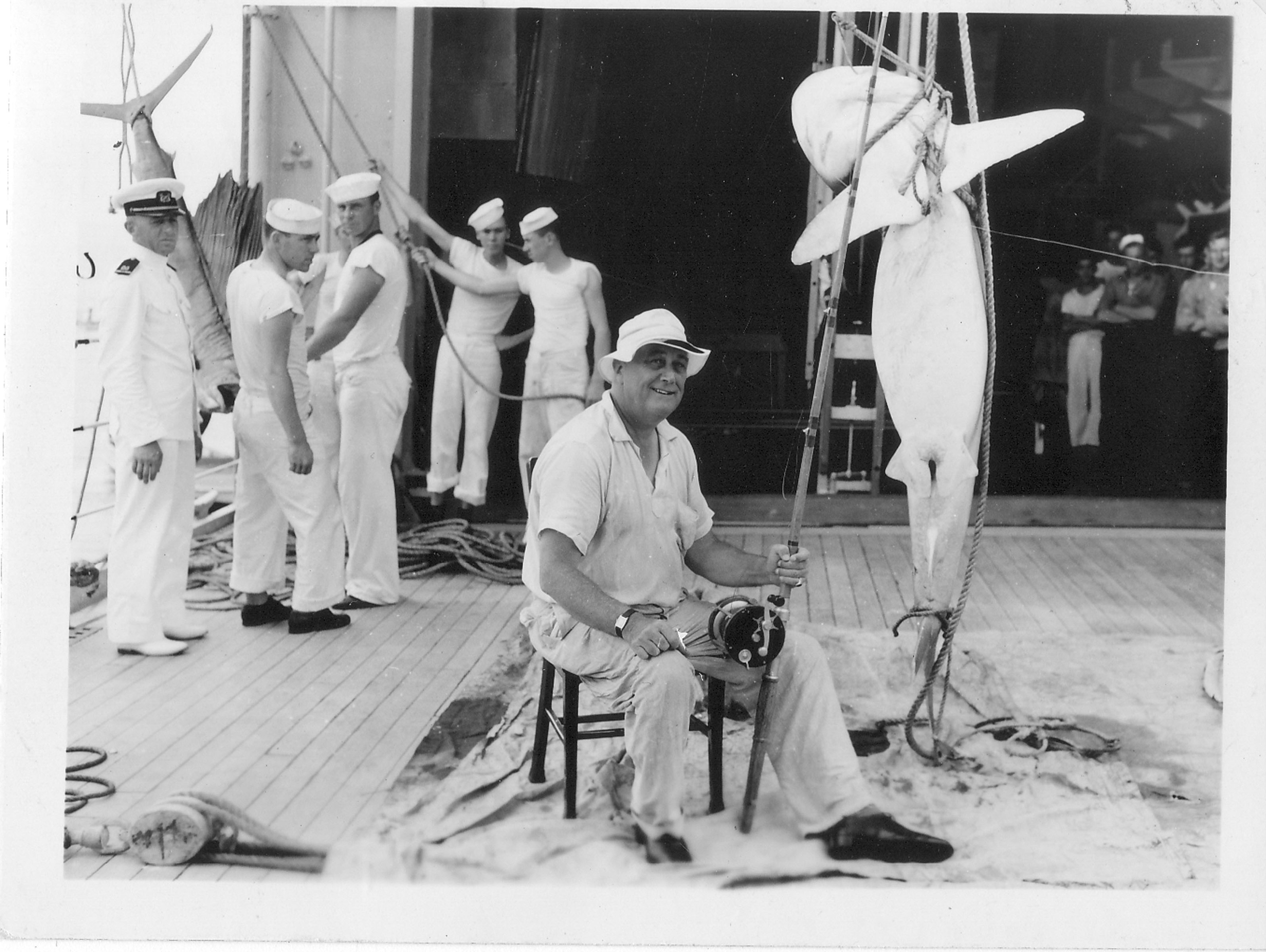
President Roosevelt with a shark caught during the Houston's 1938 visit to the Galápagos Islands.

During this period, Houston made several special cruises. President Franklin Roosevelt came aboard on 1 July 1934 at Annapolis, Maryland, for a cruise of almost 12,000 nautical miles (14,000 mi; 22,000 km) through the Caribbean and to Portland, Oregon, by way of Hawaii. Houston also carried Assistant Secretary of the Navy Henry L. Roosevelt on a tour of the Hawaiian Islands, returning to San Diego on 15 May 1935.

After a short cruise in Alaskan waters, the cruiser returned to Seattle and embarked the President again on 3 October for a vacation cruise to Cedros Island, Magdalena Bay, Cocos Island, and Charleston, South Carolina. Houston celebrated the opening of the Golden Gate Bridge at San Francisco on 28 May 1937, and carried President Roosevelt for a Fleet Review at the same city on 14 July 1938. Roosevelt then began a 24-day cruise aboard Houston to fish the waters of the Galápagos Islands, concluding on 9 August 1938 at Pensacola, Florida.

Houston became flagship of the U.S. Fleet on 19 September, when Rear Admiral Claude C. Bloch brought his flag aboard, and maintained that status until 28 December, when she returned to the Scouting Force. Continuing the routine of training exercises, she got underway for Fleet Problem XX, on 4 January 1939 from San Francisco, sailed to Norfolk and Key West, and there embarked the President and the Chief of Naval Operations, Admiral William D. Leahy, for the duration of the exercise. She arrived in Houston on 7 April for a brief visit before returning to Seattle, where she arrived on 30 May.

Assigned as flagship of the Hawaiian Detachment, the cruiser arrived in Pearl Harbor after her post-overhaul shakedown on 7 December 1939, and continued in that capacity until returning to Mare Island on 17 February 1940. Sailing to Hawaii, she departed for the Philippine Islands on 3 November. Arriving at Manila on 19 November, she became the flagship of Admiral Thomas C. Hart, Commander Asiatic Fleet.

Houston received her first 1.1-inch/75-caliber quad mount antiaircraft cannon at Mare Island in her final stateside refit (Sept./Oct. 1940); however, she also had three 3-inch/50-caliber guns in the forward and aft locations where the remaining quad 1.1" automatic cannons were to be mounted until just before the war in the Pacific broke out. Five more 1.1-inch/75-caliber quad-mount cannons were shipped to Cavite Naval Yard in the Philippines; four of these were installed aboard Houston to increase the ship's air defense protection.

== World War II ==
As the war crisis deepened, Admiral Hart deployed his fleet in readiness. Houston was to operate as part of Task Force Five (TF5) under RADM William A. Glassford, Jr. At 0900 hrs on 1 December 1941 Houston departed Cavite Navy Yard's Machina Wharf for the degaussing range in Manila Bay. This consumed about four hours, then the ship steamed out of the Bay through the mine channel and headed south for the Philippine port of Iloilo on the island of Panay. She reached her anchorage off Iloilo at 1257 hrs on the 2nd of December. There she remained, receiving fuel oil and aviation gasoline from barges while flying SOC air patrols over the next few days. At 0345 hrs on 8 December she got the message that hostilities had been initiated by Japan. At 1612 hrs that afternoon RADM Glassford and staff arrived from Manila via PBY. An hour later Houston got underway, steaming south for the Dutch East indies. Over the following days she escorted Asiatic Fleet auxiliaries Holland, Otus and Isabel to Balikpapan, Borneo, which was reached at 1927 hrs on 14 December. Houston departed the next morning at 0611 hrs escorting another US convoy south. She left the convoy after two days to proceed at high speed to Surabaja, Java, with the destroyer USS Parrott (DD-218). They reached Java on 17 December at ~1800 hrs.

=== Battle of Makassar Strait ===
Air raids were frequent in the area, and Houston's gunners shot down four Japanese planes in the Battle of Bali Sea (also known as the Battle of Makassar Strait) on 4 February 1942, as Rear-Admiral Karel Doorman of the Royal Netherlands Navy took the ABDA Striking Force to engage Japanese ships reported to be massing at Balikpapan. Houston carried defective 5"/25cal ammunition which failed her during these air attacks. After dodging bombs and shooting down at least one attacker, Houston took one 250kg bomb hit aft. This disabled the number three turret, killing four dozen men and wounding about 20 others. The old light cruiser USS Marblehead was so damaged that she had to be sent out of the combat zone. RADM Doorman abandoned his advance and returned to Java. The two American ships returned to the port of Tjilatjap. The dead from the two cruisers were interred at the European cemetery in Tjilatjap, while the wounded men from Houston and Marblehead were put on trains (5-6 Feb.) and taken to the Dutch Petronella hospital in Yogyakarta. There they came under the care of a dedicated USNR medical officer, LTCDR Corydon Wassell.

=== Timor Convoy ===
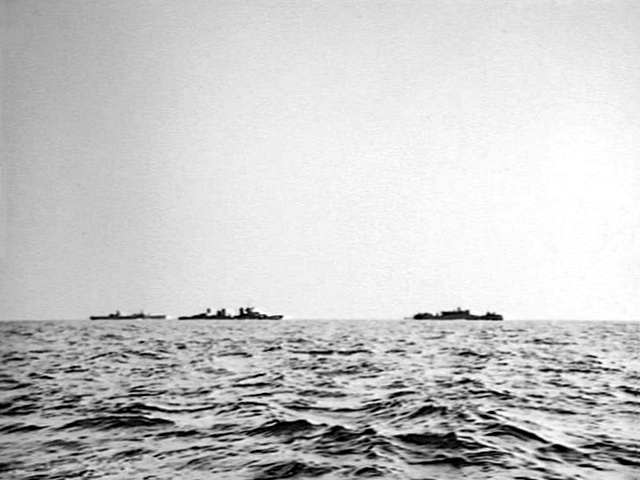
Said to be Houston, this photo may actually show USS Pensacola escorting the so-called Pensacola Convoy to Australia in December 1941. The cruiser's profile is swaybacked and shows four turrets, and the transport to the right appears to be USS Republic, which was not part of the Timor Relief convoy.

Houston stayed at Tjilatjap until 10 February, during which time she also took on some 500 rounds of 5"/25cal ammunition left behind by USS Boise (CL-47) after that cruiser had to leave the East Indies due to a grounding accident in Sape Strait in late January. This 5" ammunition, which was not marked by the defects that had plagued Houston's gunners on 4 February, would prove invaluable within a matter of days. CA-30 then left Tjilatjap for Darwin to escort a convoy carrying troops to reinforce forces already defending Timor. Escorting USAT Meigs, SS Mauna Loa, SS Portmar, and Tulagi, Houston with the destroyer USS Peary and sloops HMAS Warrego and HMAS Swan departed Darwin before two in the morning of 15 February for Koepang. By eleven in the morning, the convoy was being shadowed by a Japanese flying boat that dropped some bombs without causing damage before departing. The next morning another shadowing aircraft had taken position, and before noon the convoy was attacked by bombers and flying boats in two waves. During the first attack, Mauna Loa suffered slight damage and two casualties, one killed and one wounded. Houston's fire showed no effects. During the second attack, Houston distinguished herself with a barrage which made her "like a sheet of flame" shooting down 7 of the 44 planes of the second wave. The convoy continued toward Timor for a few hours, with Houston launching a scout plane seeking the enemy position. ABDA suspected the presence of Japanese carriers, an imminent invasion of Timor, and a support fleet lying in wait and thus ordered the convoy back to Darwin, which it reached before noon on 18 February.

Houston and Peary departed later that day to rejoin combat forces at Tjilatjap. Shortly after departure, Peary broke off to help RAN units chase a suspected submarine, and expended so much fuel in doing so that the destroyer returned to Darwin for replenishment instead of continuing with Houston. Houston thus escaped the Japanese attack on Darwin on 19 February, in which Peary, Meigs and Mauna Loa were among the ships sunk and Portmar was forced to beach. Returning to the East Indies, Houston lingered briefly off NW Australia awaiting the arrival of one of her SOC scout planes which had been sent to the coast. That plane did not rejoin CA-30, and the cruiser then proceeded to Java via the route below the Lesser Sunda islands. She narrowly missed being detected by the Japanese forces invading and seizing Timor on 19-20 February. Some of the IJN covering forces at sea included elements of 5th Cruiser Division (Sentai 5) under RADM Takagi Takeo, specifically the heavy cruisers Nachi and Haguro, both of which Houston would meet a week or so later in the Java Sea.

=== Battle of the Java Sea ===
Receiving word that the major Japanese invasion force was approaching Java protected by a formidable surface unit, Admiral Doorman decided to meet and seek to destroy the main convoy. Sailing on 26 February 1942 with the cruisers Houston, HMAS Perth, HNLMS De Ruyter, HMS Exeter, HNLMS Java and ten destroyers, he met the Japanese support force under Admiral Takeo Takagi consisting of four cruisers and 13 destroyers in the late afternoon of 27 February 1942. As Japanese destroyers laid a smokescreen, the cruisers of both fleets opened fire. After one ineffective torpedo attack, the Japanese light cruisers and destroyers launched a second and sank the destroyer HNLMS Kortenaer. HMS Exeter and the destroyer HMS Electra were hit by gunfire, Electra sinking shortly after. At 17:30, Admiral Doorman turned south toward the Java coast, not wishing to be diverted from his main purpose of destroying the convoy.

The Allied fleet dodged another torpedo attack and followed the coastline, during which time the destroyer HMS Jupiter was sunk, either by mine or internal explosion. The destroyer HMS Encounter was detached to pick up survivors from Kortenaer, and the American destroyers were ordered back to Surabaya as they had fired all their torpedoes. With no destroyer protection, Doorman's four remaining ships turned north again in a last attempt to stop the invasion of Java. At 23:00, the cruisers again encountered the Japanese surface group. Sailing on parallel courses, the opposing units opened fire, and the Japanese launched a torpedo attack 30 minutes later. De Ruyter and Java were caught in a spread of 12 torpedoes, which resulted in their destruction. Before De Ruyter sank, Doorman ordered Houston and Perth to retire to Tanjong Priok.

Two cruisers and three destroyers of the ABDA naval force were sunk, the cruiser Exeter had been damaged, and the remaining ships were ordered back to Surabaya and Tanjong Priok.

=== Battle of Sunda Strait ===
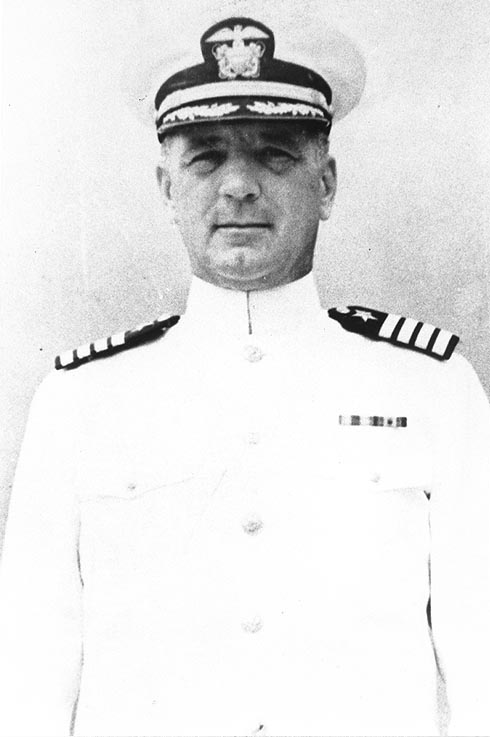
Captain Albert H. Rooks, commanding officer of Houston, c. 1940–1942.

Houston and Perth reached Tandjong Priok around midday on 28 February, where they attempted to resupply, but were met with fuel shortages and no available ammunition. The two cruisers, under the command of CAPT Waller in Perth, were ordered (by CCCF Collins) to sail to Tjilatjap with the Dutch destroyer Evertsen, but that destroyer would not leave without specific orders from Dutch HQ (CZM Helfrich). Perth and Houston therefore departed Tandjong Priok at 17:00 without Evertsen. Evertsen followed an hour or two later, and never caught up. The Allies mistakenly believed that Sunda Strait was free of enemy vessels, with the last intelligence reports indicating that Japanese warships were no closer than 50 miles (43 nmi; 80 km) to the north, and heading east. Unknown to the two cruisers a large Japanese force had assembled at Bantam Bay. At 23:06, the two cruisers were off St. Nicholas Point when lookouts on Perth sighted an unidentified ship; when it was realized that she was a Japanese destroyer, Perth engaged. However, as this happened, multiple Japanese warships appeared and surrounded the two Allied ships.

The two cruisers evaded the nine torpedoes launched by the destroyer Fubuki. According to ABDA post-battle reports, the cruisers then reportedly sank one transport and forced three others to beach, but were blocked from passing through Sunda Strait by a destroyer squadron, and had to contend with the heavy cruisers Mogami and Mikuma in close proximity. At midnight, Perth attempted to force a way through the destroyers, but was hit by four torpedoes in the space of a few minutes, then subject to close-range gunfire until sinking at 00:25 on 1 March.

On board Houston, shells were in short supply in the forward turrets, so the crew manhandled shells from the disabled number three turret to the forward turrets. Houston was struck by a torpedo shortly after midnight, and began to lose headway. Houston's gunners had scored hits on three different destroyers and sank a minesweeper, but she was struck by three more torpedoes in quick succession. Captain Albert Rooks was killed by a bursting shell at 00:30, and as the ship came to a stop, Japanese destroyers moved in, machine-gunning the decks and men in the water. A few minutes later, Houston rolled over and sank. Of the 1,061 aboard, 368 survived, including 24 of the 74-man Marine Detachment, only to be captured by the Japanese, interned in prison camps, and forced to work on the infamous Burma Railway. Of 368 Navy and Marine Corps personnel taken prisoner, 77 (21%) died in captivity from a combination of starvation, cruel treatment at the hands of Japanese soldiers, and tropical diseases. (Note: Statistics of total personnel and deaths vary slightly depending upon the source.)

=== Aftermath ===
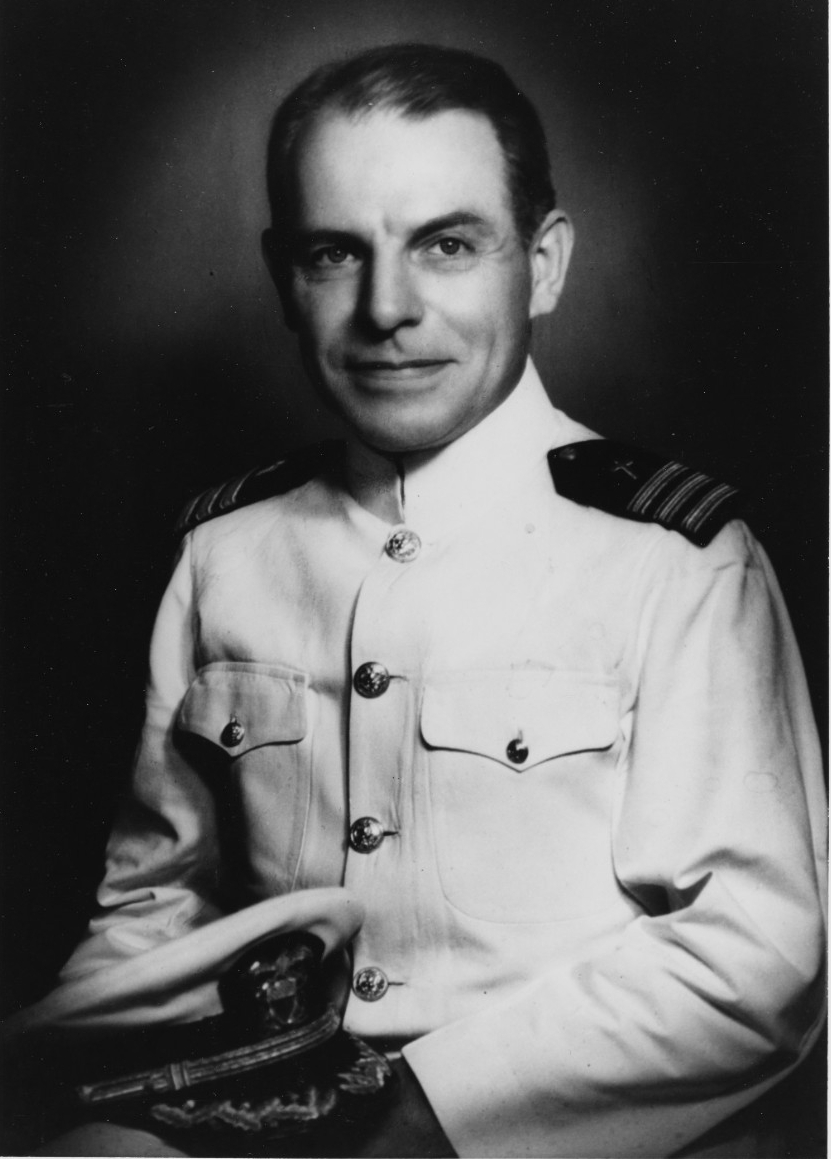
George S. Rentz, Chaplain of Houston 1940–1942.

Houston's fate was not fully known outside of Japan for almost nine months. Americans learned the full story of her last fight when the survivors were liberated from prison camps at the end of the war. Before then, on 30 May 1942, 1,000 new recruits for the Navy, known as the Houston Volunteers, were sworn in at a dedication ceremony in downtown Houston, to replace those believed lost on Houston. On 12 October 1942 the light cruiser Vicksburg (CL-81), then under construction, was renamed Houston in honor of the old ship, President Roosevelt declaring:

Our enemies have given us the chance to prove that there will be another USS Houston, and yet another USS Houston if that becomes necessary, and still another USS Houston as long as American ideals are in jeopardy.

Captain Rooks received posthumously the Medal of Honor for his actions. Chaplain George S. Rentz, who had surrendered his life jacket to a younger sailor after finding himself in the water, was posthumously awarded the Navy Cross. He was the only Navy Chaplain to be so honored during World War II.

The crew of Houston is honored alongside that of Perth at the Shrine of Remembrance in Melbourne, Australia, and in St John's Anglican Church, Fremantle. On Veterans Day, 11 November 1995, the Texas Commandery, Naval Order of the United States, unveiled a 16-foot high granite obelisk faced with bronze tablets recording the names of the crew of Houston at Sam Houston Park near the Heritage Society in downtown Houston. It is the site of a formal memorial ceremony ("Day of Remembrance") in the first week of March each year celebrating the ship's story and that of her crew.

=== The wreck ===
The wreck of USS Houston has been dived by amateur scuba divers since at least the early 1970s, first on an irregular basis, but by the late 1990s on a more semi-regular basis, with multi-day scuba diving charter-vessel trips being undertaken to specifically dive the wrecks of both Houston and HMAS Perth which rests nearby, having been sunk in the same battle as Houston. There could be no doubt whatsoever which wreck they were diving as the ships bell had been 'unofficially' raised from Houston's wreck in 1973 (as was Perth's in the late 1960s, and a book written about the 'expedition' by the salvor, David Burchell), and after passing through several hands over the years, now sits atop a plinth in a park in the city of Houston, Texas, USA (while Perth's bell is displayed at the Perth Town Hall in Western Australia). In a training evolution conducted as part of the Cooperation Afloat Readiness and Training (CARAT) 2014 exercise series, U.S. Navy divers, assisted by personnel from the Indonesian Navy, surveyed what they believed to be the wreck of Houston in June 2014. The purpose of the mission was to determine the vessel's condition and provide real-world training to rescue-and-salvage divers in maneuvering around a sunken ship. The formal report was released in August 2014 and confirmed that the wreck is indeed that of Houston. The report also stated that the wreck had suffered illegal salvage over the years, including removal of rivets and a steel plate from the hull. The investigation also recorded active oil seepage from the ship's fuel tanks. Another survey of Houston occurred in October 2015, with United States Navy and Indonesian Navy divers embarked aboard USNS Safeguard for a nine-day survey of Houston and Perth (which had also been subject to unauthorized salvaging). Divers documented the condition of the two shipwrecks, with this data presented to a conference in Jakarta on preserving and preventing the illegal salvage of wartime shipwrecks in the Java Sea.

== Awards ==
- Presidential Unit Citation
- American Defense Service Medal with "FLEET" clasp
- Asiatic-Pacific Campaign Medal with two battle stars
- World War II Victory Medal
