= And He Was Sad =

Bronze public art sculpture in Austin, Texas

- Artist: Bob Coffee
- Medium: Bronze sculpture
- Subject: Eeyore
- Location: Austin, TX; 30°17′25.7424″N 97°43′54.2424″W
- Owner: City of Austin Cultural Heritage Collection

And He Was Sad is a bronze sculpture of Eeyore, a character in A. A. Milne's Winnie-the-Pooh stories, created by artist and architect Bob Coffee. It honors the founding of Austin's "rite of spring," the now-famous Eeyore's Birthday Party. The day-long celebration began in 1963, organized by students at the University of Texas.

The sculpture was commissioned and donated by the Eastwoods Neighborhood Association in 2007. The statue is located in the Eastwoods Neighborhood Park as part of the city of Austin's public art collection.
