= Tarrytown, Austin, Texas =

Neighborhood of Austin, Texas

Coordinates: 30.30°N 97.77°W

Neighborhood boundaries

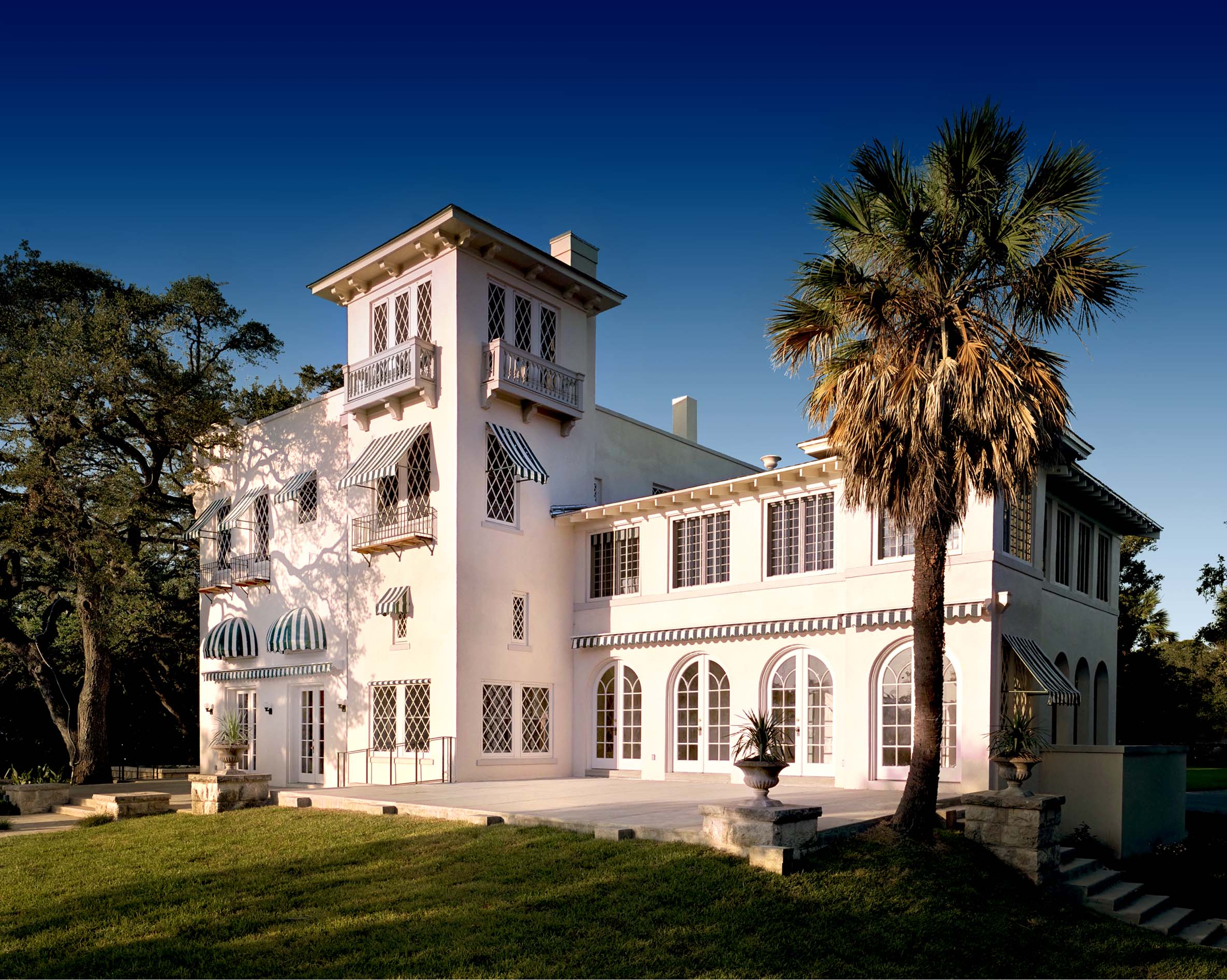
Laguna Gloria is one of several historic houses in Tarrytown.

Tarrytown is a neighborhood located west of Downtown Austin, Texas. The neighborhood is bordered by Lake Austin Boulevard on the south, Lake Austin on the west, West 35th Street on the north and Mopac Expressway on the east. Major roads in the area include Exposition Boulevard, Enfield Road and Windsor Road. Tarrytown also encompasses the sub-neighborhood of Brown Herman.

Tarrytown is most often defined as the area bounded by Enfield Road in the South, 35th Street in the North, MoPac Expressway in the East, and Lake Austin in the West. The neighborhood has two shopping outlets: Tarrytown Center and Casis Village, both of which feature local businesses. The neighborhood is also home to two schools, Casis Elementary and O. Henry Middle School. The neighborhood is serviced by two bus routes, No. 18 (Enfield/MLK Station) and No. 335 (35th/38th), and previously as well as Nos. 21-22 (Exposition/Chicon), all operated by the Capital Metropolitan Transportation Authority, or Cap Metro.

== History ==
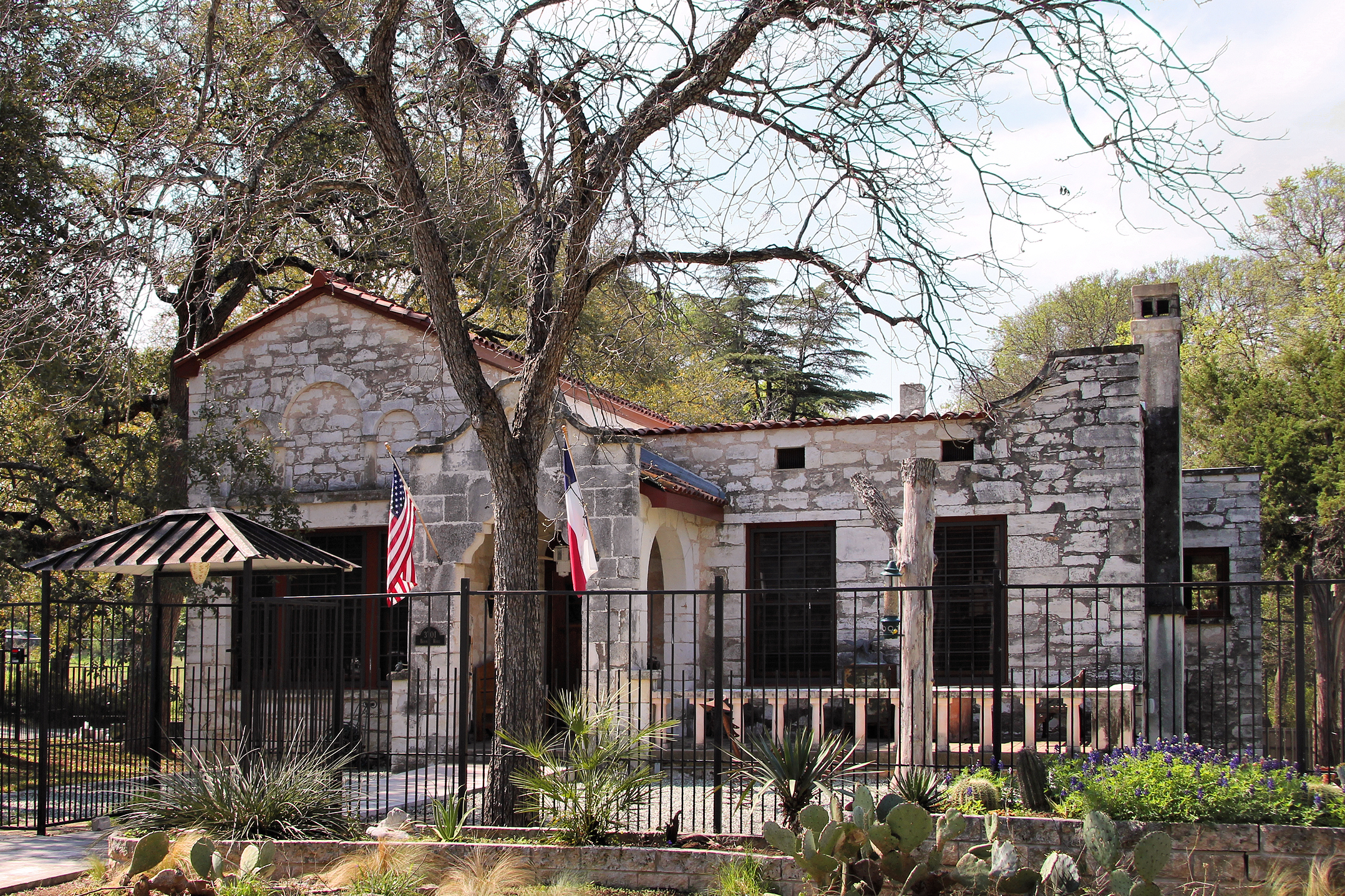
The historic James M. and Leana B. Walsh House in Tarrytown

The land where Tarrytown currently exists was originally a 365 acres (1.48 km^{2}) estate known as Woodlawn, containing a mansion designed in 1853 by master builder Abner H. Cook (who also designed the Texas Governor's Mansion) for Texas State Comptroller, James Shaw. Shaw sold the estate to Texas governor Elisha M. Pease and his wife Lucadia Christiane Niles Pease in 1857.

In 1916, Governor Pease's daughter, Julia, and grandson Niles Graham joined Graham's cousin Murray subdivided most of the estate's land and formed the Enfield Realty and Home Building Company, which developed much of the neighborhoods in Old West Austin, including Old Enfield, Pemberton Heights, and Bryker Woods. The company's secretary, Paul Crusemann, married Pease's granddaughter, Carrie Margaret Graham, who became a partner and co-developer of the firm. The first phase of the Tarrytown development, named for the family's summer retreat in Tarrytown, New York, opened on November 4, 1934, with several additional phases opening in the following years. In 1939, Carrie Graham Crusemann and Niles Graham opened the Tarrytown Shopping Center on the intersection of Windsor Road and Exposition Boulevard.

Tarrytown caught the eye of the national media when animal rights activist Jeanne Crusemann Daniels, great-granddaughter of Governor Pease, inherited the Tarrytown Shopping Center in 1999 and imposed bans on the sale of animal products or items deemed harmful to animals. The ethically-minded restrictions led some tenants, including the popular burger restaurant Holiday House, to close their doors and over time, and they made way for companies more aligned with her vision of protecting animals from needless harm.

== Education ==
Tarrytown is located in the Austin Independent School District, and its children are served by these public schools:

- Tarrytown preschool
- Casis Elementary School
- O. Henry Middle School
- Austin High School
