= Splitrock (Austin, Texas) =

Historic house in Texas, United States

Coordinates: 30.298753°N 97.750397°W

- U.S. Historic district – Contributing property
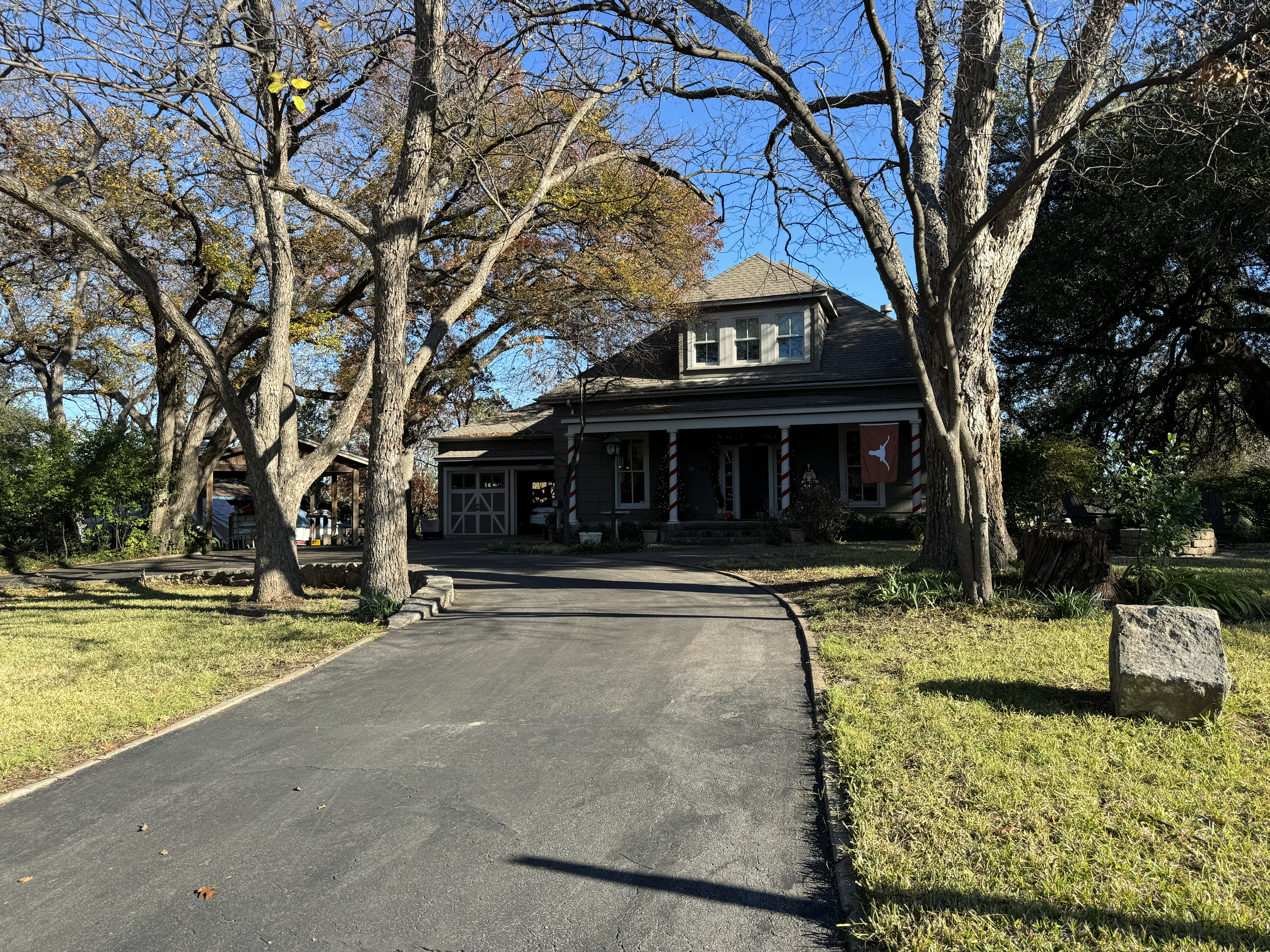

- Location within Texas Location within the United States
- Location: 2815 Wooldridge Dr., Austin, Texas
- Built: 1893
- Built by: Robert F. Burns
- Part of: Old West Austin Historic District (ID03000937)
- Added to NRHP: September 12, 2003

Splitrock is a house in Austin, Texas, built in 1893 by a Scottish immigrant named Robert F Burns. Located at 2815 Wooldridge Dr. (30.298753, -97.750397) on bluffs overlooking Shoal Creek, the house was one of the first in the central Austin area which is now occupied by the Pemberton Heights and Bryker Woods neighborhoods. The name Splitrock is derived from a topographic feature (an extremely large rock split in half) and swimming hole located approximately 300 feet (91 m) south east of the house. In 2006 Splitrock was designated as a City of Austin Historic Landmark. The house also referred to as the “Burns-Klein” house is a contributing property to the Old West Austin National Register Historic District.
