= The Contemporary Austin =

Art museum in Texas, US

Coordinates: 30°18′43.6896″N 97°46′27.5592″W

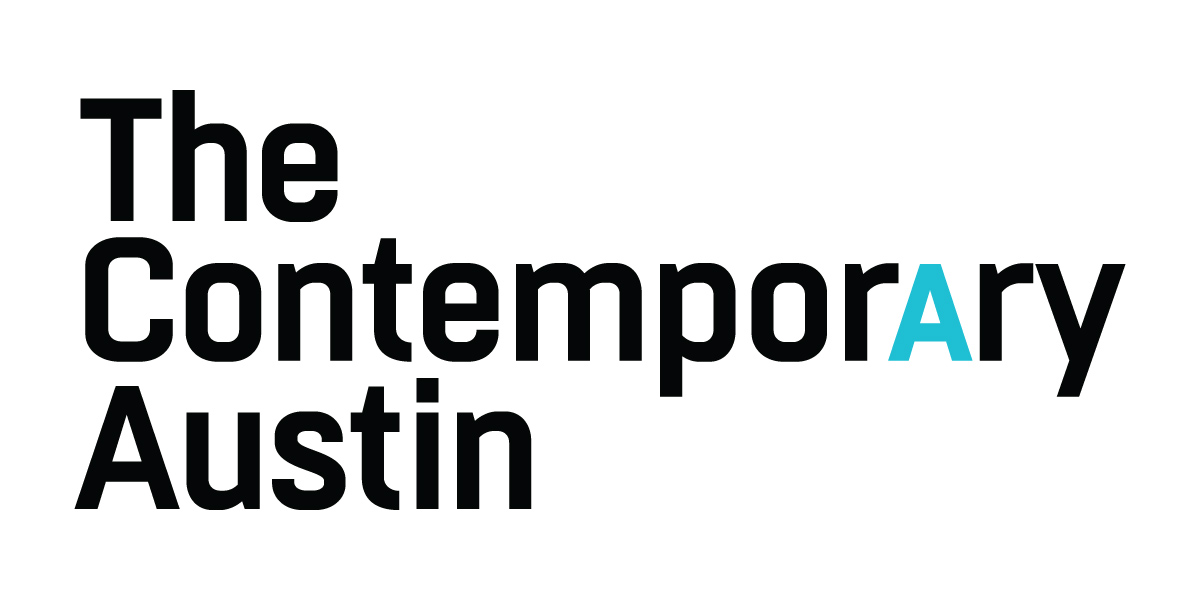
- Established: 1911
- Location: Jones Center; 700 Congress Ave; Austin, TX 78701; Laguna Gloria; 3809 West 35th Street; Austin, TX 78703
- Director: Sharon Maidenberg
- Website: thecontemporaryaustin.org

The Contemporary Austin is a contemporary art museum in Austin, Texas, comprising two locations, an art school, and the Museum Without Walls program, bringing sculpture to city parks. Locally, the museum is often referred to as the Contemporary. It has been called "the go-to institution for all things cutting edge in Austin’s world of fine art.

== Jones Center on Congress Avenue ==
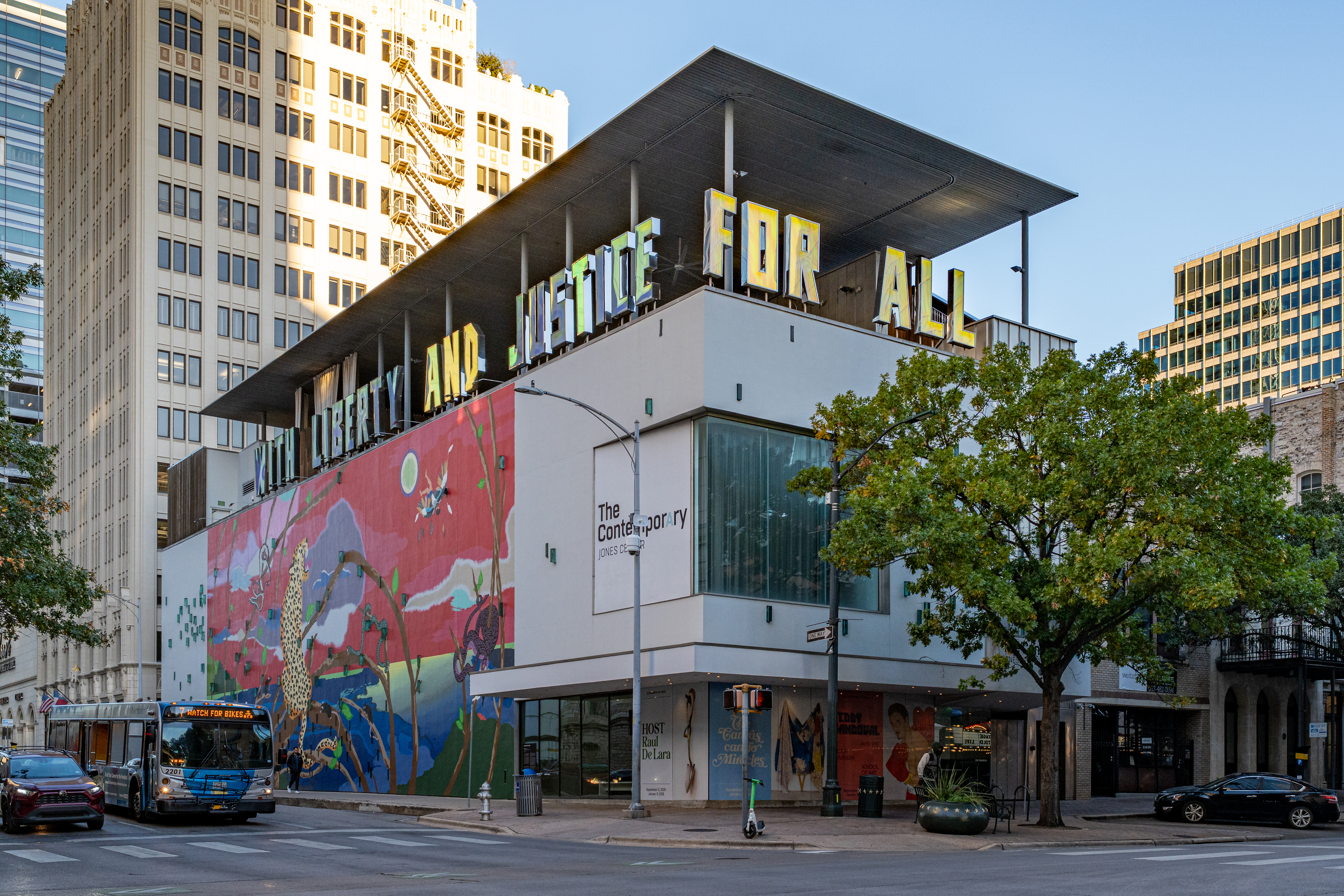
The Contemporary Austin – Jones Center on Congress Avenue

Designed by architects Lewis.Tsurumaki.Lewis, The Jones Center includes 7000 square feet of exhibition space, along with a community room and a roof-top deck with a 21-foot-high canopy for events and educational programming.

== Laguna Gloria ==
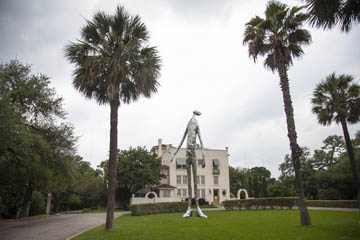
The Contemporary Austin – Laguna Gloria

Once owned by Stephen F. Austin, the Laguna Gloria site is on state and national registers of historic places. The site consists of 14-acres on Lake Austin, including the restored 1916 Italianate-style Driscoll Villa that was the home of Clara Driscoll, and the extensive Betty and Edward Marcus Sculpture Park.

== Art school ==
Laguna Gloria is also home to The Contemporary Austin's Art School, one of the largest museum-affiliated schools in the nation, where classes are taught year-round to adults and children. The Art School has an enrollment of just under 5,000 students and offers scholarships to approximately 50 students per year. Docent-led school tours serve roughly 10,000 students annually, many from Title 1 schools.

== Museum Without Walls ==
The Contemporary's Museum Without Walls program has installed outdoor sculptures in city parks, including David Deming's monumental Mystic Raven in Pease Park, and a sculpture garden in Perry Park.

== See also ==
- List of museums in Central Texas
