= Samuel E. Gideon =

20th-century architect and architectural historian in Austin, Texas

Samuel Edward Gideon (ˈsæmjul ˈɛdwərd ˈɡɪdiən) was a 20th-century architect and architectural historian most active in Austin, Texas, and as a professor at The University of Texas, Austin School of Architecture.

He was Chair of the Central Texas Branch of the Landmarks Preservation Committee, and he created illustrated brochures on Austin and its architecture. He also served as President of the Guild of Austin Artists, the Texas branch of the National Committee on the Preservation of Historic Buildings, and the Texas Alumni of Fontainebleau.

== Education ==
He was born on December 9, 1875, in Louisville, Kentucky. Gideon studied architecture at both the Massachusetts Institute of Technology (MIT) and Harvard University. Gideon graduated from MIT in 1906. He is found in the list of students for the 1907 issue of Technique, MIT's photography, yearbook and design student organization. He also attended the School of Fine Arts at Fontainebleau.

== Professor and teacher ==
From 1900 to 1904, he taught at Texas A&M; then, from 1905 to 1913, he taught Mechanical Drawing and Descriptive Geometry at MIT's Department of Architecture.

He took a leave of absence from teaching for the spring 1912 semester to prepare for his drawing classes at Texas A&M and draft plans for the mess hall and dormitory.

In 1913, he finally became a Professor of Architectural Design and Architectural History at the University of Texas (UT Austin) As one of the first architecture professors at the University of Texas, he focused much of his work on Texas historic architecture.

At The University of Texas, Gideon held various lectures about World War I, including “The Art of Camouflage,” “Rheims Cathedral,” and “Some Belgium and French buildings in Path of War.”

He lectured at the Texas Folklore Society, where he read his paper, “Early German Architecture in Gillespie County.”

== Artist ==
Gideon was recognized as an artist, notably in Mexico and in Europe. Known as a landscape and historical painter, he focused his artwork on architecture using watercolor, such as The Alamo in San Antonio, Texas, and the Spanish missions in California. He showed his watercolors and sketches around the State of Texas, including an exhibit of 50 watercolor images in Bryan, Texas, on Tuesday, March 28, 1916, and Saturday, January 20, 1917. His artwork was exhibited in other states, such as Colorado, New York, Pennsylvania, South Carolina, Maryland, Massachusetts, and Tennessee. Additionally, his artwork was featured in collections located in Texas and Kansas.

He served as the Secretary of the Texas Fine Arts Association.

Although he was credentialed as an architect, he was known as a "watercolorist," influencing such artists as John Bruce Erwin, who studied architecture at The University of Texas (Erwin's collection of 217 works are in the Panhandle-Plains Historical Museum in Canyon, Texas.). He served in the U.S. Navy during the World War II, and then created violins; two violins are in the Moscow Conservatory.

== Architect and architectural historian ==
Gideon, trained as an architect, influenced F. E. Gieseeke, architect of Texas A&M University. In particular, Gideon designed the Civil Engineering Building (1909) and the Academic Building, before leaving Texas A&M University to teach at The University of Texas. In 1995, when Texas A&M began to renovate older buildings, the renovations included restoring some of the original 1913 designs by the two men.

Gideon was also consulted by various individuals in building, moving, and renovating homes. For example, the parents of Hollywood legend Zachary Scott, Dr. and Mrs. Z. T. Scott, wanted to restore an old home; they purchased a run-down Greek Revival home for $300 and had it disassembled and moved to a 12-acre piece of land overlooking Lake Austin. The home was called the Swisher Home and was built in 1852 by John Swisher, an Austin businessman who had also fought with Sam Houston and the Republic of Texas treasurer. The Swisher Home had a history (General Robert E. Lee had visited, among other guests), and Dr. Scott appreciated the house; however, as he began to draft the plans to reconstruct the home, he realized he was not prepared for the task. He consulted Gideon to research the original plans and adapt the home, per the original design to a 14-room home—"Sweetbrush"—that was recognized as a masterpiece in Austin. (A photograph of the Swisher House can be found in the Portal to Texas History [archive] at the University of North Texas.) The Swisher-Scott House is located at 2408 Sweetbrush Drive in Austin.

Gideon replicated historic homes by pencil, watercolor, or ink to retain their images, such as his works published in The International Studio. He studied architecture around the world (e.g., Imperial Theater at Fontainebleau).

He was passionate about Texas architecture, and he authored several works on historic architecture:

- Landmarks in Austin Texas (1925), advertised for sale for $1.00 per copy and "illustrated by woodcuts made from original drawings" that Gideon created of the landmarks.
- Historic and Picturesque Austin (1936) highlights outstanding landmarks and locations in Austin, Texas including St. David's Church, the Governor's Mansion, The Colonel James H. Reymond Home, The Shelley House, the Neill-Cochran House, Amelia Barr, Elisabet Nay's Studio, The Old General Land Office, the State Capitol, the State Cemetery, Sunny Ridge, Austin Women's Club and the homes of significant Austinites. This book aided in the restoration of Swisher Home, due to the fact that Gideon drew the building when it was in good condition. Specifically, the staircase was a perfect replica of its original design using the sketch Gideon had made of it in the past.
- Fredericksburg, a Little German Town in the Lone Star State (thought to be published in 1935)
- Austin and the Austin National Bank, 1890–1940 (1940), which discusses the architecture features of the national bank and the bank statements involved in the creation of this building. The book mentions several dams in Austin, including Tom Miller Dam, Marshall Ford Dam, Roy Inks Dam, Buchanan Dam.

He served on the Board of Advisory Editors for The Western Architect.

He was published in April 1931 issue of the Pencil Points magazine with his article "Sunday Hours in Austin" and in The American Magazine of Art with his article, "Two pioneer artists in Texas."

He also delivered several Texas-centric presentations, including “Our Cultural Heritage” to the Texas Historical Association on Saturday, April 27, 1940, on a panel titled “Historic Houses Section.”

Gideon's papers from 1908–1945 are held by the Briscoe Center for American History at The University of Texas at Austin. These papers and photographs document Gideon's professional life and include "correspondence, biographical material, clippings, articles, essays, student papers, sketches, photographs, negatives, slides, and paintings."

== Advocate ==
The Gideons contributed to Southern and Texas art and architecture. Gideon also invested in the preservation of historic buildings in Fredericksburg, and the recognition of trees as part of the historic landmarks in Austin.

Additionally, the Gideons purchased and invested in their personal home, known as Pemberton Castle in Austin, TX.

=== O. Henry Home ===
Samuel Gideon was particularly dedicated to studying American writer O. Henry. He collaborated with other scholars, historians, and friends of author O. Henry to place a stone marker at the true O. Henry home, originally located at 308 East Fourth Street in Austin, and to shift the home to a museum.

The O. Henry home previously was confused with a nearby home at 304 East Fourth Street—often enough to warrant the stone marker. (The house in its original location was photographed and is now documented in the Portal to Texas History at the University of North Texas.)

To preserve O'Henry's home, the house was relocated to 409 East Fifth Street in Austin in March 1934. Because of Gideon's advocacy, the O. Henry home on at the new location in Austin was repurposed as the O. Henry Museum.

=== Fredericksburg, Texas, historic buildings ===
In 1938, Gideon advocated saving a historic Fredericksburg courthouse from being demolished.

=== Trees as landmarks ===
Gideon also advocated for the preservation of Texas trees: as landmarks and also as a part of Texas heritage. He identified a number of older trees near historic homes and sites that marked locations of historical events. He shared urban myths and oral traditions about trees throughout Austin, advocating for the trees to be recognized. (His historic references also demonstrate the racism of the 1930s in Austin.)

He noted that East Texas' pine trees and oaks were being harvested or burned to make space or to provide lumber. He challenged several Texas cities to save or replace their trees: Gonzales and its oak trees, Fredericksburg's oak trees, Orange's sycamores and a mighty pine tree (on Pine Street), Victoria's oaks (replaced with hackberries) and hackberries (replaced with palms), Bastrop's pine groves, and Austin's hackberries. Instead, he encouraged Texans, and specifically Austinians, to plant native trees.

He also advocated for respect of Texas wildflowers, petitioning Texas to seek to stop picking and selling wild flowers and instead to let them naturally proliferate, preventing extinction.

=== Pemberton Castle ===
In the 1890s, a round stone water cistern (later a water tower and pump house) was constructed in the Fisher farm and approximately 30 years later, Samuel Fisher converted the stone building into the sales office for the new Pemberton Heights subdivision, and the limestone "wings" were added to expand the castle appearance. The subdivision sits in the Old West Austin Historic District and today boasts 613 homes, including cottages, estates, and the Pemberton Castle.

In 1937, Gideon and his wife, Sadie Cavitt, purchased the castle and began to develop it into their home. The structure, now called the Fisher-Gideon House, was described as "an asymmetrical Gothic Revival style structure with a rough stone face and prominent castellated parapets."

The couple began to integrate elements of other homes into the castle, including

- bricks and stained-glass windows from "Old Main," a demolished building on the campus of The University of Texas
- flooring (leftover slate) from the Home Economics Building on the campus
- stones from the O. Henry House
- main staircase from the Bishop Kinsolving House on Whitis Court in Austin (Rumor has it that the staircase was designed and created by Peter Mansbendel, a woodcarver of Swiss descent.)

The Gideons used the first floor for storage but added a kitchen, a master bathroom, and a studio to the Pemberton Castle. Gideon died in 1945, and Sadie Cavitt continued to live in the castle until her death in 1954.

Pemberton Castle is frequently recognized as the site for the Disney film "Blank Check."

The castle is located at 1415 Wooldridge Dr, in Austin, TX, and is in the heart of Pemberton Heights. In front of the house, the Texas Historical Commission has placed a historic marker with information about the home's history.

== Personal life ==
Samuel Gideon was born on December 8, 1875, in Louisville, KY.

In 1908, Gideon married Sarah "Sadie" Griffin Cavitt, who also born in Bryan, TX and also an artist. Together, they actively invested time and energy in the art and architecture communities of Austin, Texas.

Gideon died August 13, 1945, and is buried in the Texas State Cemetery in Austin. Sadie Griffin Cavitt died November 8, 1954, at their home, the Pemberton Castle, 1415 Wooldridge Drive, in Austin.
