= Tarrytown (disambiguation) =

Tarrytown is the name of some places in the United States of America:

- Tarrytown, New York
- Tarrytown, Florida
- Tarrytown, Georgia
- Tarrytown, Austin, Texas
- Sleepy Hollow, New York, formerly known as North Tarrytown

== Fictional towns ==
- Tarrey Town, a fictional town in The Legend of Zelda: Breath of the Wild and The Legend of Zelda: Tears of the Kingdom
- Tarrytown, a fictional town in Jay Jay the Jet Plane
