= Ethel Felder Webster House =

Historic Building

Coordinates: 30.279495°N 97.752011°W

The Ethel Felder Webster House (or Baugh-Colby House) is a historic two-story home in the Enfield historic district in Austin, Texas. The home was built in 1917 and was among the first five built on Enfield Road. All were completed by 1918 and are listed in the city directory for that year. It is the only surviving house of these originals.

== Architecture ==
The home is a two-story stucco structure with a wide porch, built in the Prairie School style after Frank Lloyd Wright. It is one of ten remaining Prairie School buildings in the Old Enfield neighborhood. The home has been described as a special “Austin vernacular” adaption by an expert on Frank Lloyd Wright architecture.

== History ==
The Enfield neighborhood was platted from the eastern pasture of Elisha M. Pease's expansive Woodlawn estate in 1914. This structure was part of the "Enfield A" subdivision. It is located at 1102 Enfield Road, on a slight rise where Enfield Road begins.

This home and its garage apartment are contributing structures to the Old West Austin Historic District, listed on the National Register of Historic Places. In June and August 2006 respectively, the Austin Historic Landmark Commission and Austin Planning Commission deemed the home worthy of historic designation. The City Preservation Officer has also argued for the home's historic preservation.

== Notable residents ==
Ethel Felder was born in Chappell Hill, Texas on October 9, 1886. Her family had large land holdings in that county, and the town of Felder was near Chappell Hill. Felder married Harry Daniel Webster and bore two children, Dan and Barbara. Mrs. Webster was widowed at age 26 in 1912.

Webster had an exhibition of miniatures at the Art Institute of Chicago in 1914 when she was living in Westport, Connecticut. She was also listed in "Who's Who in Art" as a painter there in 1915. Ethel Felder Webster is listed in "Who Was Who in American Art: 400 Years of Artists in America."

By 1918, Webster and her children had moved to Austin and were living in this home. After several years, they moved to California where she, a pianist, was on the faculty of the San Francisco Conservatory of Music.

Her surviving paintings show a gift for realistic portraits, including a self-portrait of a modern woman with short hair and the clothing and jewelry of the late 1920s.

Harry Daniel Webster, a nationally known sculptor, was born in Iowa in 1880 and trained by master sculptors and painters. He created statues in Saugatuck, Westport ("The Minuteman"), and at the State Capitol at Pierre, South Dakota. He also sculpted a statue of Senator W.H.H. Beadle of South Dakota, which was placed in Statuary Hall in the United States Capitol. Webster also created the great bronze doors for Austin's American National Bank Building, originally located in the Littlefield Building at Sixth and Congress). The doors were cast by Tiffany. Their West Texas theme with prominent longhorns reflects the life of cattle baron George Littlefield. (These massive doors were given to UT and are now in the Ashbel Smith Building on West Sixth Street.) Mr. Webster died at age 32 in 1912.

Before the original owner of this house was known, it was named for two others prominent former residents: State Appeals Judge James Baugh and UT department chair Malcolm Colby.
