= Clarksville Historic District (Austin, Texas) =

Historic district in Texas, United States

- U.S. National Register of Historic Places
- U.S. Historic district
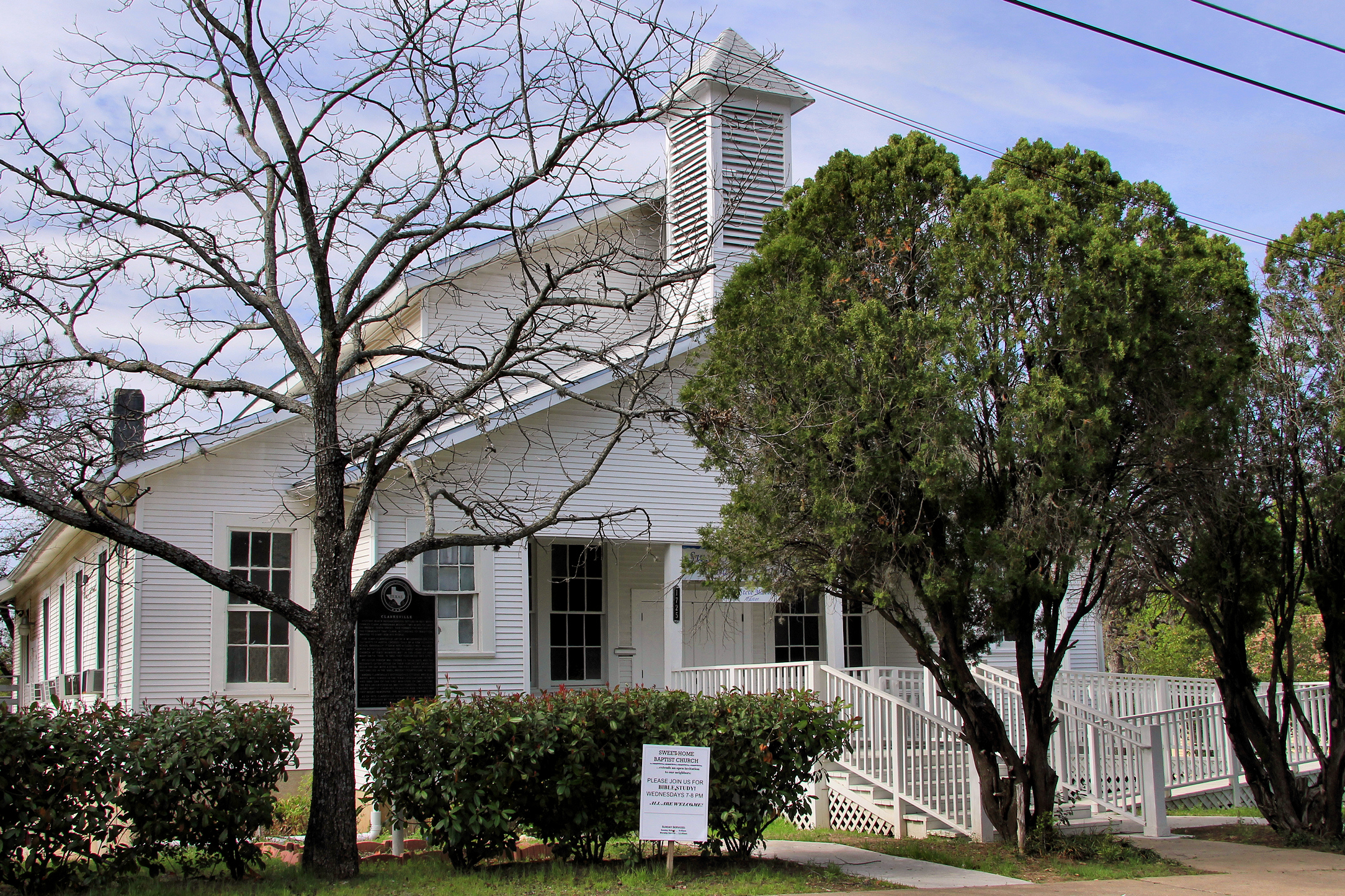
- The Sweet Home Baptist Church serves as the focal point of the neighborhood.
- Location: Bounded by W. Lynn, Waterston, W. 10th and MO-PAC Expwy., Austin, Texas
- Coordinates: 30°16′51″N 97°45′44″W
- Area: 305 acres (123 ha)
- Built: 1871
- Architect: Edmerson, Willis
- Architectural style: American Craftsman Bungalow, Late Victorian
- NRHP reference No.: 76002070
- Added to NRHP: December 1, 1976

The Clarksville Historic District in Austin, Texas, is an area located west of downtown Austin near Lady Bird Lake and just northeast of the intersection of the Missouri Pacific Railroad and West Tenth Street. Many historic homes and structures are located within the Clarksville Historic District. While Clarksville is geographically part of the Old West Austin Historic District, it is distinct from the two historic neighborhoods of Old Enfield, which lies immediately to the north on the eastern side of Texas State Highway Loop 1 (commonly referred to as Mopac), and Tarrytown, which is situated to the west and northwest on the western side of Mopac.

Founded by freedman Charles Clark in 1871, Clarksville is the oldest surviving freedman's town ‒ the original post-Civil War settlements founded by former African-American slaves ‒ west of the Mississippi River. The historic district was inducted into the National Register of Historic Places in 1976 in recognition of its unique and valuable history.

The Clarksville Historic District is located within City Council District 9.

== History ==
The area was originally part of a 365-acre (148 ha) tract of land belonging to Texas Governor Elisha Pease, and in 1871 was sold to Charles Clark, a freedman who would start the community that now bears his name. Clark built a house on what is now West Tenth Street and subdivided the remainder of the land to other freedmen. Just a mile west of Austin, Clarksville soon became a de facto part of the city, especially when the International-Great Northern Railroad laid tracks nearby in the 1870s. The Sweet Home Baptist Church, a cornerstone of the community to this day, was founded prior to 1882, and a school existed as early as the 1890s.

At least six communities of emancipated slaves existed around Austin, including Wheatville (founded by James Wheat and home to celebrated Austin black leader Reverend Jacob Fontaine), Pleasant Hill, and Clarksville.

However, early in the twentieth century developers began to realize the land value of Clarksville, which lay near growing downtown Austin. Austin city policy aimed to concentrate the local black population in the east, and pressured black communities in west Austin, such as Clarksville and Wheatville, to move. In 1918 the Austin school board closed the Clarksville school. Clarksville residents were later forced to use city services in east Austin or none at all. The 1928 Austin city plan embraced Jim Crow and recommended "that all the facilities and conveniences be provided the Negroes in this district, as an incentive to draw the Negro population to this area." Most Clarksville residents endured the lack of services, however, and refused to move. In 1968 Clarksville residents unsuccessfully protested a state and local plan to build a highway along the Missouri Pacific Railroad, which extended along the western boundary of Clarksville. The completed Mopac Expressway sliced through the community, forcing 33 families to leave.

Despite pressure to move to segregated east Austin, Clarksville retained its African-American identity throughout the 20th century. Residents of Clarksville began requesting Austin city funds for the improvement and preservation in 1964, but dirt streets crossed the area until 1975, and a creek carrying sewage periodically flooded homes. However, in 1975 the Texas Historical Commission designated a two-block-wide strip of Clarksville as a historic district, and the city paved the streets with asphalt. In 1976 the Austin City Council approved the use of $100,000 from a federal housing and community-development grant to pave streets permanently, improve drainage, and expand the neighborhood playground. Another $100,000 was designated for housing rehabilitation. The same year Clarksville residents and supporters defeated a plan to build a thoroughfare through the community connecting Interstate 35 and the MoPac Expressway. Later in the 1970s, as rising land values drove lower-income residents out of the area, the Clarksville Community Development Corporation was established to provide low-income options to preserve the community's character. The district was added to the National Register of Historic Places in 1976.

== Clarksville today ==
Many European immigrants settled in Clarksville throughout the early 1900s, building a community still felt today. Anthony Colanetta settled in Clarksville and opened Anthony's Laundry & Cleaners at the corner of West 12th Street and West Lynn in 1950. Colanetta also built a drugstore that he leased to his friend Hylton Nau. The Nau Enfield Drugstore soda fountain eventually closed in 2023. In 1979 Craig Weller and Mark Skiles opened Clarksville Natural Grocery, and a year later they joined forces with John Mackey to open the first Whole Foods, then called Clarksville Natural Grocery. Austin Bat Cave, a nonprofit founded in the 2000s dedicated to fostering creative writing in grade school and high school students, opened its doors in a clapboard house on West Eleventh Street.
