= Brown Herman, Austin =

Coordinates: 30.30°N 97.77°W

Neighborhood boundaries

Brown Herman (sometimes referred to as "Herman Brown") is a neighborhood located just west of downtown Austin, Texas. It is often included within the boundaries of Tarrytown or Bryker Woods.

== About ==
The boundaries of the neighborhood are disputed however it is most commonly defined as the neighborhood west of MoPac Expressway, east of Exposition Boulevard, south of W. 35th Street, and north of Westover Road. However it is sometimes extended west to Scenic Drive and south to Windsor Road. It includes both residential streets as well as the Austin State Supported Living Center. In 2008, the median home price was listed at $654K for around 3,000 square feet.

== Transportation ==
The neighborhood is currently serviced by Capital Metro route No. 335 (35th/38th), and previously by routes Nos. 21-22 (Exposition/Chicon).

== Education ==
Brown Herman is located in the Austin Independent School District, and its children are served by these public schools:

- Casis Elementary School
- O. Henry Middle School
- Austin High School

The neighborhood is also near Rawson Saunders School and The Girls' School of Austin.
