= Texas A&M University School of Architecture =

Architecture College at Texas A&M University

Texas A&M University College of Architecture
- Type: Public
- Established: 1905; 121 years ago
- Parent institution: Texas A&M University
- Dean: Patrick Suermann (Interim)
- Location: College Station, Texas, United States; 30.618814°N 96.337647°W
- Website: www.arch.tamu.edu

Texas A&M University College of Architecture is the architecture college of Texas A&M University.

With over 2,900 students, the college is one of the largest architectural colleges in the nation. Established in 1905, Texas A&M's architecture program is the oldest in Texas. The program became a formal college at Texas A&M in 1969.

== Departments ==
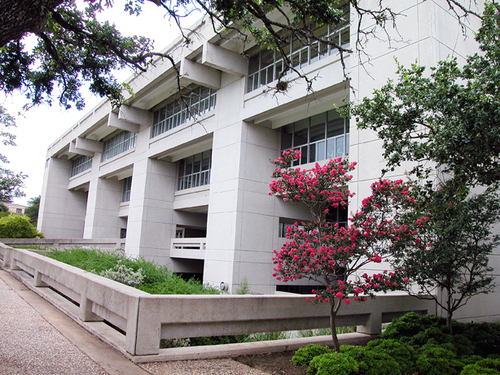
Langford Architecture Center Building A

The college's three departments — architecture, construction science, and landscape architecture and urban planning — together offer 15 degree programs, including undergraduate programs, master's degree programs, and three Ph.D. programs.

- Architecture

The Department of Architecture at Texas A&M University is one of the largest and most diverse professional programs in the United States, with five unique degree programs. Nationally ranked among other accredited professional programs in architecture, the department enters its second century of architectural education by creating and disseminating knowledge to students through the studio education method with emphases on health, historic preservation, sustainability, and emerging technologies.

- Construction Science

The Department of Construction Science is one of the largest programs of construction higher education in the nation. The department's primary mission is to prepare undergraduates and graduate students for successful careers in construction and construction-related industries. In 2021 it became the first institution in Texas to offer a Ph.D. in Construction Science.

- Landscape Architecture and Urban Planning

The Department of Landscape Architecture and Urban Planning, through two undergraduate and four graduate degree programs, provides education, research and outreach in planning, design, development and management of communities to continually improve the quality of the living environment, and by extension, the quality of our lives.

== Degrees and majors ==
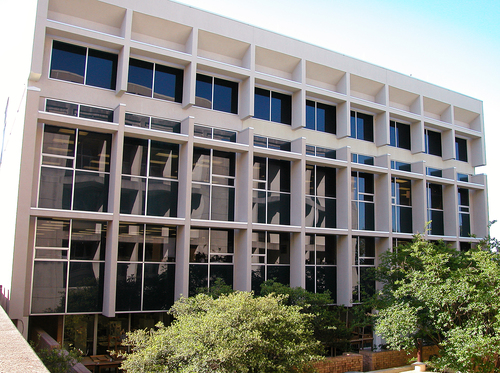
Langford Architecture Building C

=== Department of Architecture ===
- Doctor of Philosophy (Ph.D.) in Architecture
- Master of Science in Architecture (M.S.)
- Master of Architecture (MArch)
- Master of Architecture — Career Change
- Bachelor of Environmental Design (B.E.D.)

=== Department of Construction Science ===
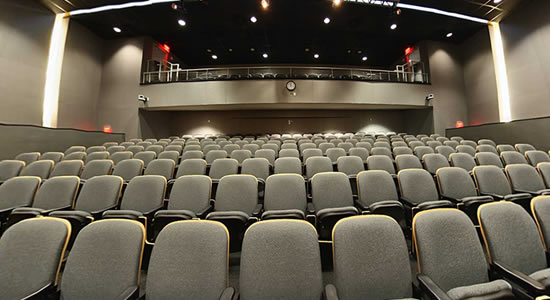
Geren Auditorium in Langford Building B. The newly renovated facility's space mainly consists of the auditorium and workshop; however, there are also offices located on the second floor

- Doctor of Philosophy (Ph.D.) in Construction Science
- Master of Science (M.S.) in Construction Management
- Bachelor of Science in Construction Science (B.S.)

=== Department of Landscape Architecture and Urban Planning ===
- Bachelor of Science in Urban & Regional Planning (B.S.)
- Bachelor of Landscape Architecture (B.L.A.)
- Master of Land and Property Development (M.L.P.D)
- Master of Landscape Architecture (M.L.A.)
- Master of Urban Planning (M.U.P)
- Doctor of Philosophy in Urban & Regional Science (Ph.D.)

=== Minors in the College of Architecture ===
- Architectural Fabrication & Product Design
- Architectural Heritage Conservation
- Art and Architecture History
- Facility Management
- Health Systems & Design
- Leadership in the Design and Construction Professions
- Sustainable Architecture & Planning
- Urban Planning

== Notable people ==
=== Faculty ===
- Samuel E. Gideon, professor of architecture
- Adrian Smith, American architect
