= Austin Bat Cave =

Non-profit organization

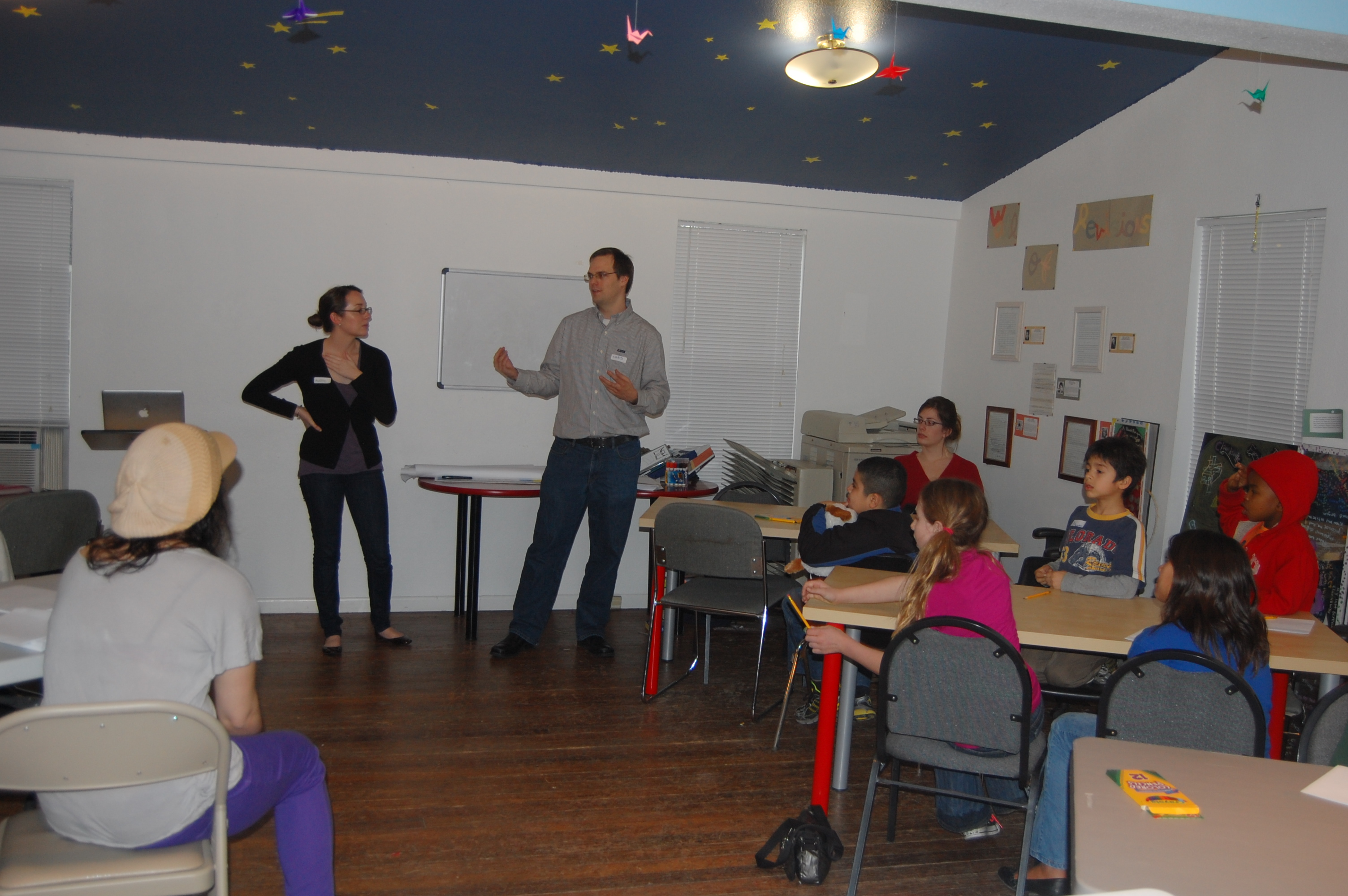
- In 2010

- Location in the United States
- Abbreviation: ABC
- Formation: 2005 or 2007
- Founders: Heather Davis; Ryan Vaughn; S. Kirk Walsh
- Type: Non-profit organization
- Purpose: Education
- Headquarters: 1807 West 11th Street
- Location: Austin, Texas, United States
- Executive director: Syed Ali Haider
- President of the board of directors: Claudia Chidester
- Affiliations: 826 National
- Website: www.austinbatcave.org

Austin Bat Cave (ABC) is a 501(c)(3) nonprofit organization in Austin, Texas, United States. An affiliate of 826 National, ABC provides grade school through high school students with both in-school and extra-curricular opportunities to help develop their creative writing skills, along with similar classes and storytelling events for adults.

== History ==
Austin Bat Cave (ABC) was founded in 2005 or 2007 by Heather Davis, Ryan Vaughn and novelist S. Kirk Walsh in Austin, Texas. Having been inspired by 826 Valencia—a San Francisco based project which focused on enhancing literary arts education for children—the ABC founders' stated objective was to empower grade school through high school students to bolster their writing skills. The goal was to inspire the children to take pleasure in becoming lifelong readers and writers. The name Austin Bat Cave was chosen to emphasize the need for aspiring local student writers to figuratively enter into their own 'cave' in order to properly focus on the creative writing process. ABC's original location was a house in Austin's Clarksville Historic District. In 2013, the organization drew up plans to set up Center of the Earth Visitors Center on Austin's Cesar Chavez Street, a storefront modeled after 826 Valencia's pirate supply store, Brooklyn Superhero Supply, and Time Travel Mart in Los Angeles. ABC is an affiliate of 826 National, the nonprofit organization that grew out of 826 Valencia.

== Programs ==
ABC's in-school tutoring focuses on absorbing grammar fluency through creative writing, rather than the usual emphasis on the rules of grammar and punctuation. Students in the ABC program generate and revise their work, as well as act as their editorial board to put together an anthology for each year. In 2010, anthology content was judged by poets Roger Reeves and Nick Flynn.

In addition to these activities, ABC offers after-school programs. At the Tuesday and Thursday evening and weekend workshops, students get real-world writing experience, such as at the Texas Tribune newsroom. They got together with local creatives such as Okkervil River frontman Will Sheff, director Carlos Trevino, poet Jenny Brown, and Jake Silverstein, editor of Texas Monthly. During these sessions, students learn about and work on an aspect of a writer's craft in such diverse areas as journalism and hip-hop song lyrics. Each summer, ABC offers 10-13 weeklong summer camps, many of which are open registration. One of these weeklong camps focused on fiction writing.

ABC offers creative writing classes for adults. In 2010, the organization initiated its Story Department. Inspired by New York-based nonprofit The Moth, its aim was to draw in people of all ages to participate in their monthly storytelling events, which were to be held in local pubs.

== Leadership and advisory board ==
After an initial phase wherein ABC had difficulty holding down an executive director for an extended period of time, Syed Ali Haider was elevated to the position after having previously served as ABC's program director. Claudia Chidester is the president of the board of directors.

ABC's operations are under the advisory of a number of Austin notables, including filmmaker Richard Linklater, Evan Smith of Texas Monthly and James Magnuson of the Michener Center for Writers. Operating as a 501(c)(3) nonprofit organization, all of ABC's programs are free of charge.

== Volunteers and support ==
Numerous volunteers from the arts, education, and activist communities of Austin support ABC's mission statement. Many of these volunteers are affiliated with the University of Texas at Austin. ABC connects a diverse population of young leaders with a community of adult volunteers by providing one-on-one tutoring.

ABC has a strong donor base, which stems from individuals, foundations, and businesses. Supporters include Burdine Johnson Foundation, Legge Lewis Legge, Lewis Carnegie and Home Slice Pizza among hundreds of other donors. ABC is partnered with the Blanton Museum of Art, the Austin Film Society and the Texas Book Festival. The organization received a cash award via the City of Austin's 2023 Creative Space Assistance Program.
