= Judge Robert Lynn Batts House =

Historic house in Texas, United States

- U.S. National Register of Historic Places
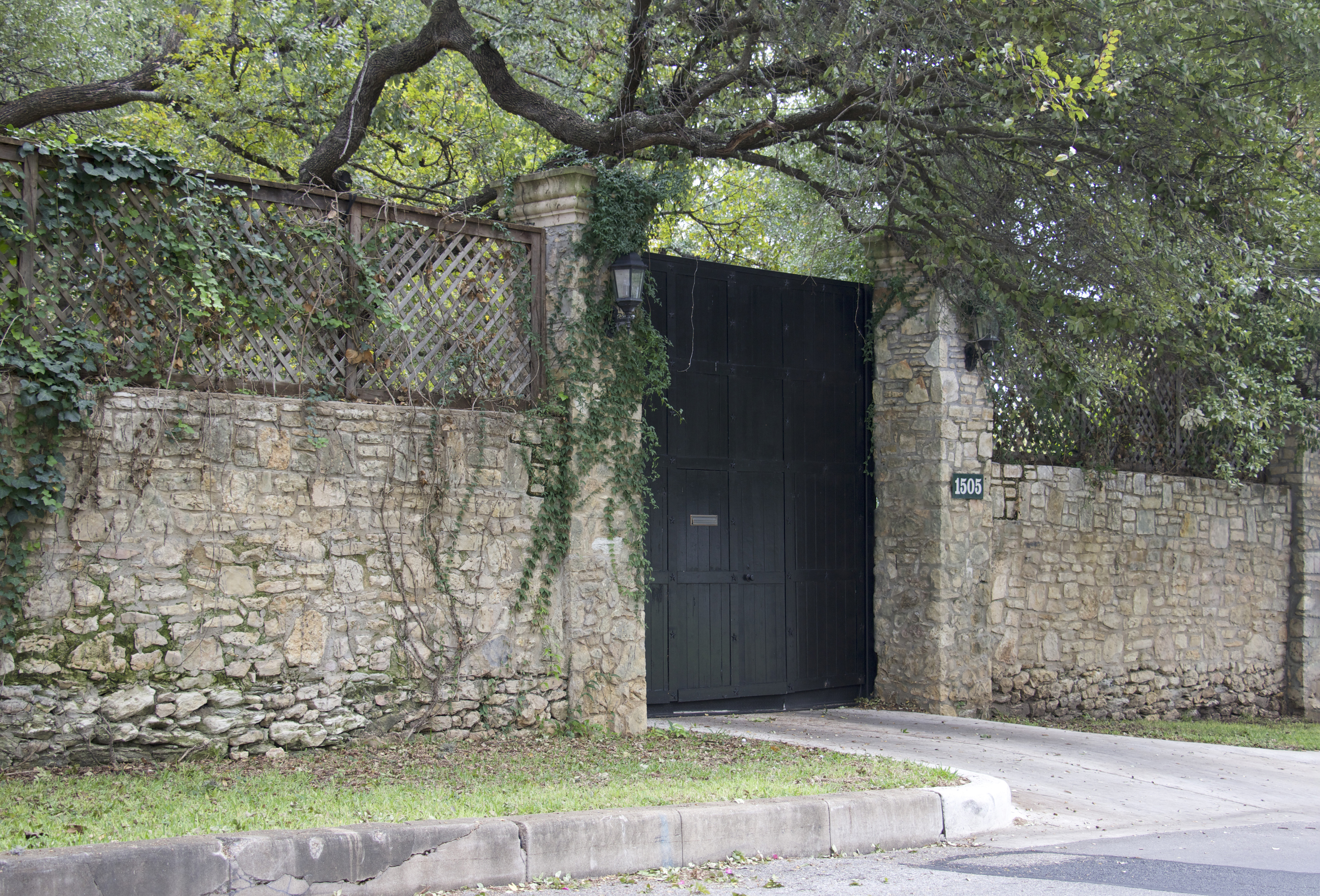
- Front gate of the house

- Location within Texas Location within the United States
- Location: 1505 Windsor Rd; Austin, Texas, USA
- Coordinates: 30°16′50″N 97°45′10″W
- Built: 1924
- Architect: Raymond Everett
- NRHP reference No.: 84002002
- Added to NRHP: August 22, 1984

The Judge Robert Lynn Batts House is a historic home in central Austin, Texas, United States. It was built 1924–1925 for Judge Robert Lynn Batts and his family. Over the course of several decades, Judge Batts served in the Texas House of Representatives, as assistant attorney general of Texas, and as a law professor at the University of Texas at Austin.

The 2 1/2-story home was built at the top of the hill overlooking Shoal Creek to the east. It is a part of the Old West Austin Historic District.

The home is located at 1505 Windsor Road. It was added to the National Register of Historic Places in 1984.
