= Old West Austin Historic District =

Historic district in Texas, United States

- Old West Austin Historic District and Boundary Increase
- U.S. National Register of Historic Places
- U.S. Historic district
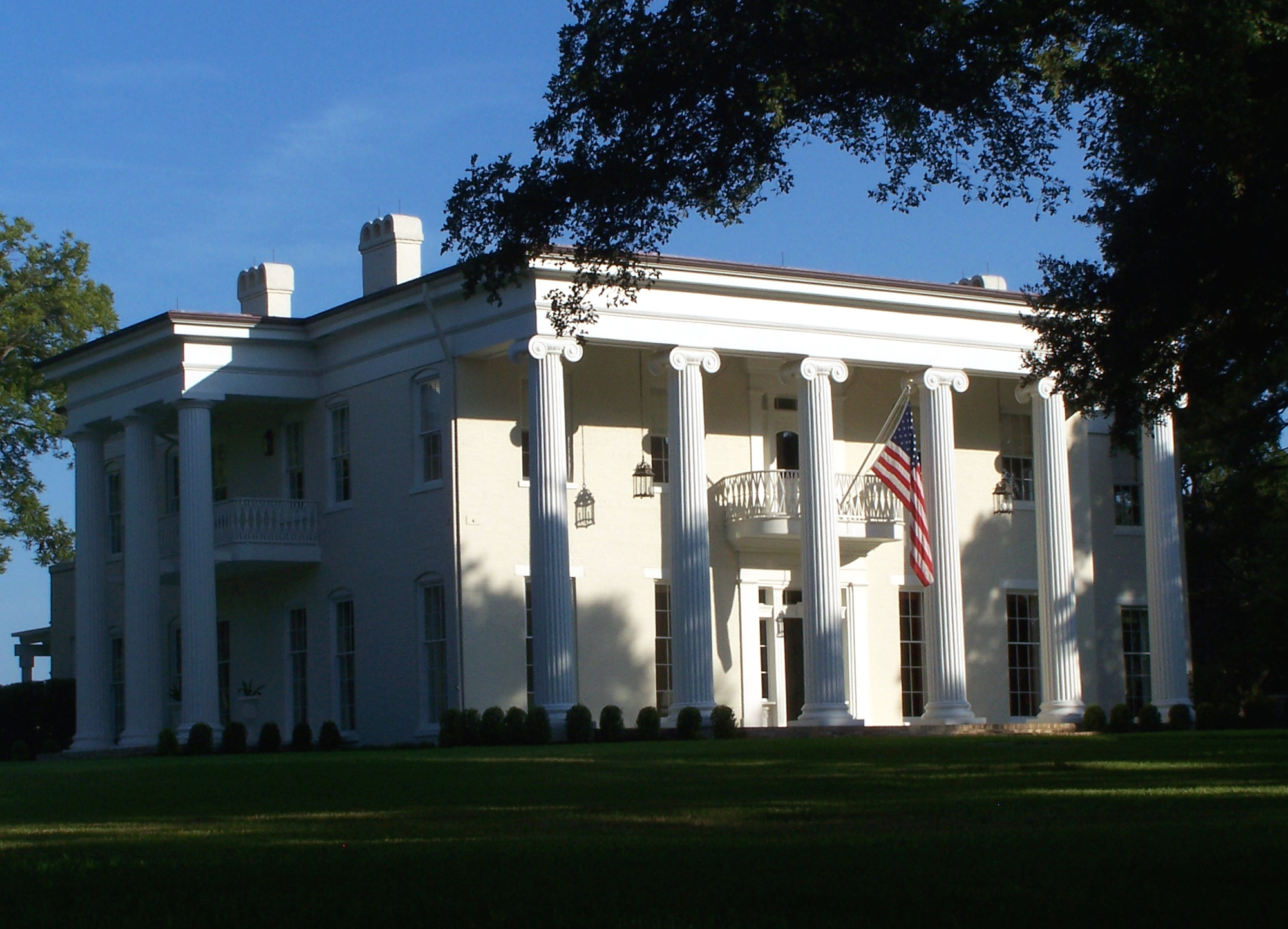
- Woodlawn, the oldest home in the district
- Location: Austin, Texas
- Coordinates: 30°15′49″N 97°46′36″W
- Area: 6,500 acres (2,600 ha)
- Built: 1853
- NRHP reference No.: 03000937; 03001413
- Added to NRHP: September 12, 2003; January 16, 2004

The Old West Austin Historic District is a residential community in Austin, Texas, United States. It is composed of three neighborhoods located on a plateau just west of downtown Austin: Old Enfield, Pemberton Heights, and Bryker Woods. Developed between 1886 and 1953, the three historic neighborhoods stretch from Mopac Expressway east to Lamar Boulevard, and from 13th Street north to 35th Street. It borders Clarksville Historic District and the West Line Historic District to the south.

The streetcar had propelled Austin's earlier local suburban development, but Enfield, Pemberton Heights, and Bryker Woods were the city's first automobile suburbs. As a well-preserved collection of early-to-mid-20th century residences, the historic district evokes the measured spread of suburban development that paralleled the city's steady growth. The three neighborhoods that together form Old West Austin were added to the National Register of Historic Places in 2003.

== Settlement of Old West Austin ==
For much of the 19th century, Shoal Creek and West Avenue defined the western edge of the city. Austin was planned on a 640-acre site on a bluff above the Colorado River, nestled between Shoal Creek (West Avenue) to the west and Waller Creek (East Avenue) to the east Edwin Waller in 1839. The story of the settlement of Old West Austin begins with the oldest and best-known home in the area, Woodlawn. James B. Shaw, an Irish immigrant who served as State Comptroller in Texas Governor Elisha M. Pease's administration, purchased several hundred acres of land west of Austin in 1846.

Shaw commissioned Austin architect Abner Cook to build a two-story Greek Revival mansion on his property. The house was finished in 1853, one year before Cook built the Texas Governor's Mansion. Almost as soon as the building was completed Shaw abandoned the idea of living there because of family tragedies. In 1856, Governor Pease bought Woodlawn, and it remained in his family for nearly fifty years. Woodlawn's adjoining acreage would eventually be sold and subdivided to create the Enfield neighborhood.

Following emancipation at end of the Civil War, Texas Governor Pease sold and gave some of his plantation land to his freed black slaves. In 1871 this neighboring area came to be known as Clarksville and was legally set apart from the other areas of town specifically for the freed black slaves.

It was called Clarksville because Charles (Griffin) Clark, a land developer with an eye to reselling to the newly freed slaves, purchased a 365-acre (1.48 km^{2})tract of land from former slaves where he founded the town of Clarksville, less than one-half mile from Woodlawn.

Other important West Austin developments during the 1870s included the establishment of the International and Great Northern Railroad, which defines the historic district's western boundary, and the establishment of Pease Park, which define the district's eastern boundary. The land was donated to the city by the Pease family. Shoal Creek is the centerpiece of Pease Park. The waterway attracted recreational use as early as the mid-nineteenth century.

=== Old Enfield ===
The oldest and southernmost neighborhood in the historic district is Old Enfield. Its approximate boundaries are Windsor Road on the north, Pease Park on the east, 13th Street to the south, and the Mo-Pac Expressway on the west. Originally part of the Pease family's plantation just west of Austin, the neighborhood was subdivided in 1910 by the Enfield Realty and Home Building Company. Old Enfield is home to many of the oldest colonial style-homes in Austin, including Woodlawn which was built by Texas Governor's Mansion architect Abner Cook.

Additionally, Old Enfield encompasses several additions platted between 1914 and 1948. Two later additions were platted on the west side of the historic district after 1948. The plan for Old Enfield is largely intact incorporating several small island parks along curvilinear streets at the edge of Pease Park.

=== Pemberton Heights ===
Due north of Old Enfield is the suburb of Pemberton Heights. The area that would become Pemberton Heights was acquired in 1858 by Judge John Harris, who was the attorney general for Governor Pease and husband of the daughter of Samuel Rhoads Fisher, a signer of the Texas Declaration of Independence. S.W. Fisher, president of the Austin Development Company, also became an owner and ultimately developed the land. The subdivision was named after James Pemberton (1723–1809), an ancestor of the Fischer family who received notoriety because of his political views during the days of the American colonies. The Fisher family went on to inherit the farm and would establish the Austin Land Company. In 1927, the company built a bridge across Shoal Creek and began development.

Between 1927 and the early 1940s, Pemberton Heights was developed in 12 sections. Pemberton Heights is primarily one to two-story single-family residences and not as many duplexes as the other neighborhoods. It has, on average, the largest houses and most spacious lots in the Old West Austin Historic District.

Over 25 structures in Pemberton Heights have been designated as Austin Historic Landmarks by the City Council including the Windsor Road Bridge, which was built in 1928. Its importance stems not only from its architectural merit, but also because prior to its construction, Pemberton Heights and other Old West Austin area residents could only access downtown by crossing Shoal Creek on the State Street Bridge, which is now a pedestrian bridge adjacent to the 34th Street Bridge.

=== Bryker Woods ===
Bryker Woods is the northernmost suburb of the Old West Austin Historic District. The suburb encompasses several parcels of land that were platted between 1886 and 1951. Bryker Woods experienced intense development between 1936 and 1940.

By the late 1990s, the State of Texas began exploring improvement and expansion of Mopac Expressway. By 2000, Bryker Woods, Pemberton Heights, Old Enfield, and Old West Austin neighborhoods organized because of concerns over the potential expansion of Loop 1, which they believed would result in the demolition of as many as 80 houses. In 2003, they were successful in establishing the Old West Austin Historic District. One significant aspect of this historic designation is that federal law requires additional studies, review, and approval if using federal dollars on a project that could result in the demolition of properties in the district, which adds significant time and cost to the project. As federal dollars are needed for the expansion of Loop 1, this designation prevented the expansion of Loop 1 beyond its current right-of-way within these neighborhoods.

== Description and significance ==
The area is noted for approximately 1,574 historically significant properties within its borders.

== List of significant properties ==
Several properties and sites in the Old West Austin Historic District have been designated as historic Austin landmarks by the city:

- Ethel Felder Webster House
- Fisher-Gideon House (Pemberton Castle), 1415 Wooldridge
- Splitrock (Austin, Texas)
- Judge Robert Lynn Batts House
- Cruchon Home, 1200 Windsor
