= Eeyore's Birthday Party =

Annual festival in Austin, Texas, USA

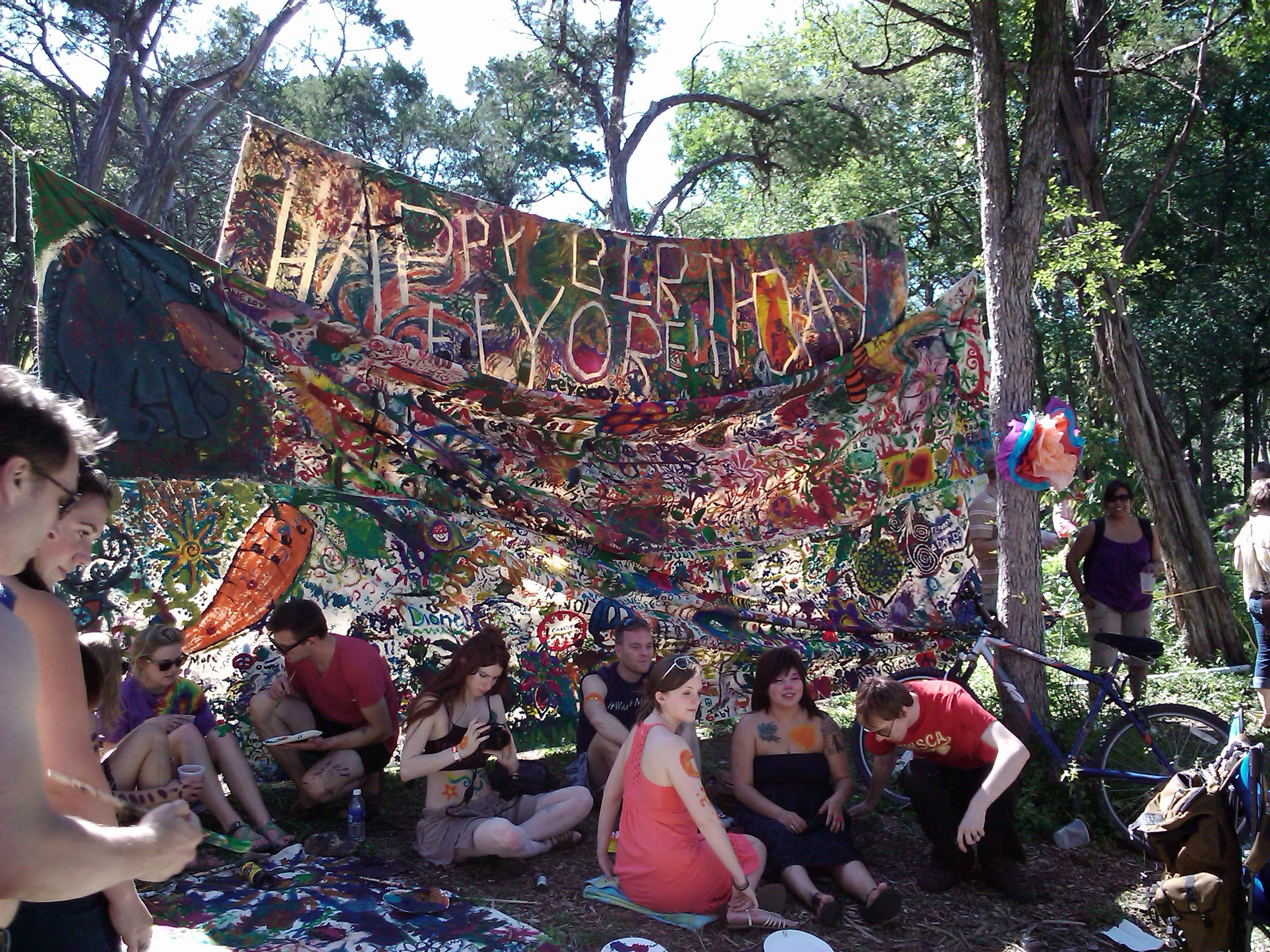
Eeyore's Birthday Party, 2010

Eeyore's Birthday Party is a day-long festival which takes place annually in Austin, Texas since 1963. It typically occurs on the last Saturday of April in Austin's Pease District Park. It includes live music, food and drink vending which benefit local non-profit organizations, attendees in colorful costumes, and very large drum circles. The event is frequented by children and families, with specific events presented for them by the event organizers. The festival is named in honor of Eeyore, a character in A. A. Milne's Winnie-the-Pooh stories.

== History ==
Eeyore's Birthday Party began in 1963 as a spring party and picnic before the beginning of ‘dead week’, hosted by Plan II students and faculty, and first led by Lloyd Birdwell, an English graduate student at the University of Texas at Austin. It was named for Eeyore, a chronically depressed donkey in A. A. Milne's Winnie-the-Pooh stories who, in one story, believes his friends have forgotten his birthday only to discover they have planned a surprise party for him. Despite its name, the event does not fall on the official birthday of the fictional character. The original event was held at Eastwoods Park and featured a trashcan full of lemonade, beer, honey sandwiches, a live flower-draped donkey, and a may pole (in keeping with the event's proximity to May Day). For many years the party was a UT tradition, but subsequently the annual Birthday Party became a tradition in Austin's hippie subculture.

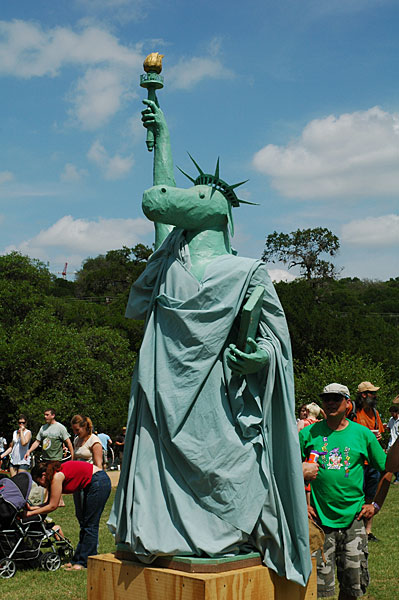
The Eeyore of Liberty, a statue which combines the Statue of Liberty with Eeyore, frequently appears near the drum circles at this annual event.

When the festival moved from Eastwoods Park to Pease District Park in 1974, Austin-area non-profit Friends of the Forest Foundation, an organization which distributes funds to other area charities, began arranging for food and drink vendors at the festival. In the early 80s, the University YMCA took over production of the event, initiating adult beverage sponsorships and creating the child and adult costume contests, the first aid booth, the kiddie area, and many more features still happening at the event. By the mid-1980s, the Friends of the Forest had assumed primary production responsibilities such as arranging public services (toilets, buses, security, medics) and scheduling live music and family-oriented games and contests. The event is still known to most as a festival oriented towards modern hippies. Consumption of psychedelics is widespread among all demographic groups. It now boasts an annual attendance in the thousands.

The 2020 festival was held online, as officials scrapped the in-person party due to the COVID-19 pandemic.

== Contemporary ==
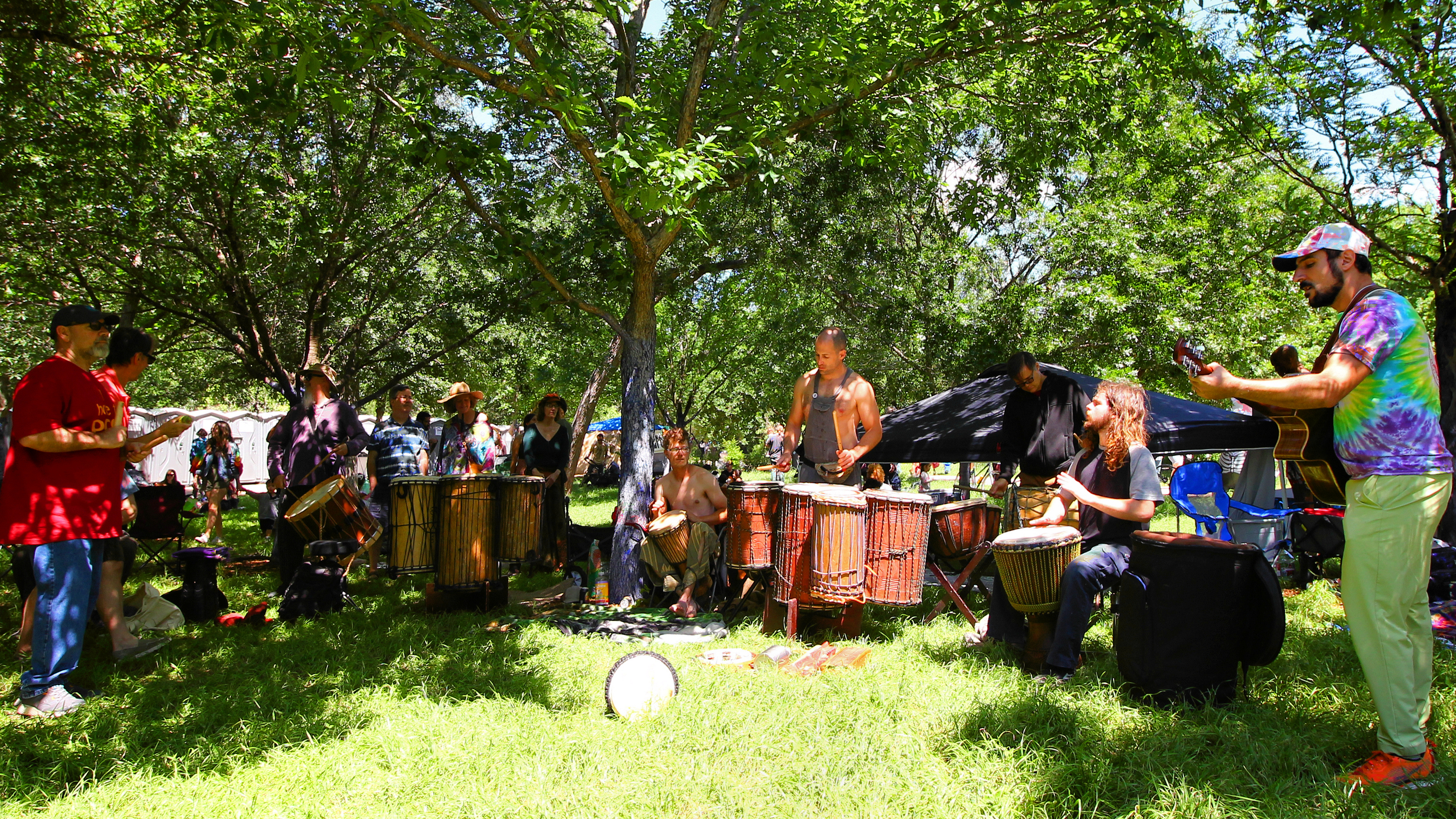
A drum circle at the 2023 Eeyore's Birthday Party. Drum circles at the festival range in size from a handful of participants to circles with hundreds of drummers and dancers. Drummers bring a wide variety of instruments from hand drums to kettledrums.

What started as a small picnic for University of Texas at Austin students has today swelled to a major annual festival with live bands, non-profit vendors of food, drink and local beers, as well as a children's area complete with arts and crafts and carnival games, family-oriented games and contests such as costume contests, and an egg toss. Attendance at the Birthday Party is free. Weather-permitting, it occurs on the last Saturday in April in Pease District Park; a rain date is scheduled for the following weekend. Bright and diverse costumes are common. In keeping with the original traditions of the event, a live donkey and a may pole are always present. The event begins in the late morning and continues until dusk. Food and drinks are sold onsite by local Austin 501c-3 non-profit groups. Purified water is available onsite for participants to fill their own containers. Due to the lack of parking in the area and the high attendance, the Friends of the Forest Foundation provides festive shuttle buses between state parking lots just north of the capitol building and Pease Park. Singing of folk and road trip songs is encouraged on the short bus ride.

Eeyore's Birthday Party is attended by people from a wide variety of backgrounds and ages, some of whom may have been attending for decades. Austin's hippie community still puts in a major appearance at the event, which they celebrate by forming large drum circles which can sometimes contain hundreds of drummers and dancers in the large areas of the park not occupied by other events. Members of the Deaf community like the drum circles because they can feel the vibrations.

As of 2008, the event has also spread to Seattle's Cal Anderson Park as an annual celebration.
