= Pemberton Heights, Austin, Texas =

Neighborhood in Austin, Texas

Neighborhood map

Pemberton Heights is a neighborhood of Austin, Texas, and part of the Old West Austin Historic District. The area is bounded by Northwood Road on the north, Lamar Boulevard/Shoal Creek on the east, 24th Street/Windsor Road on the south, and Texas State Highway Loop 1 ("MoPac") on the west. It is Austin's wealthiest and most historic neighborhood.

Pemberton Heights is located in city council District 10.

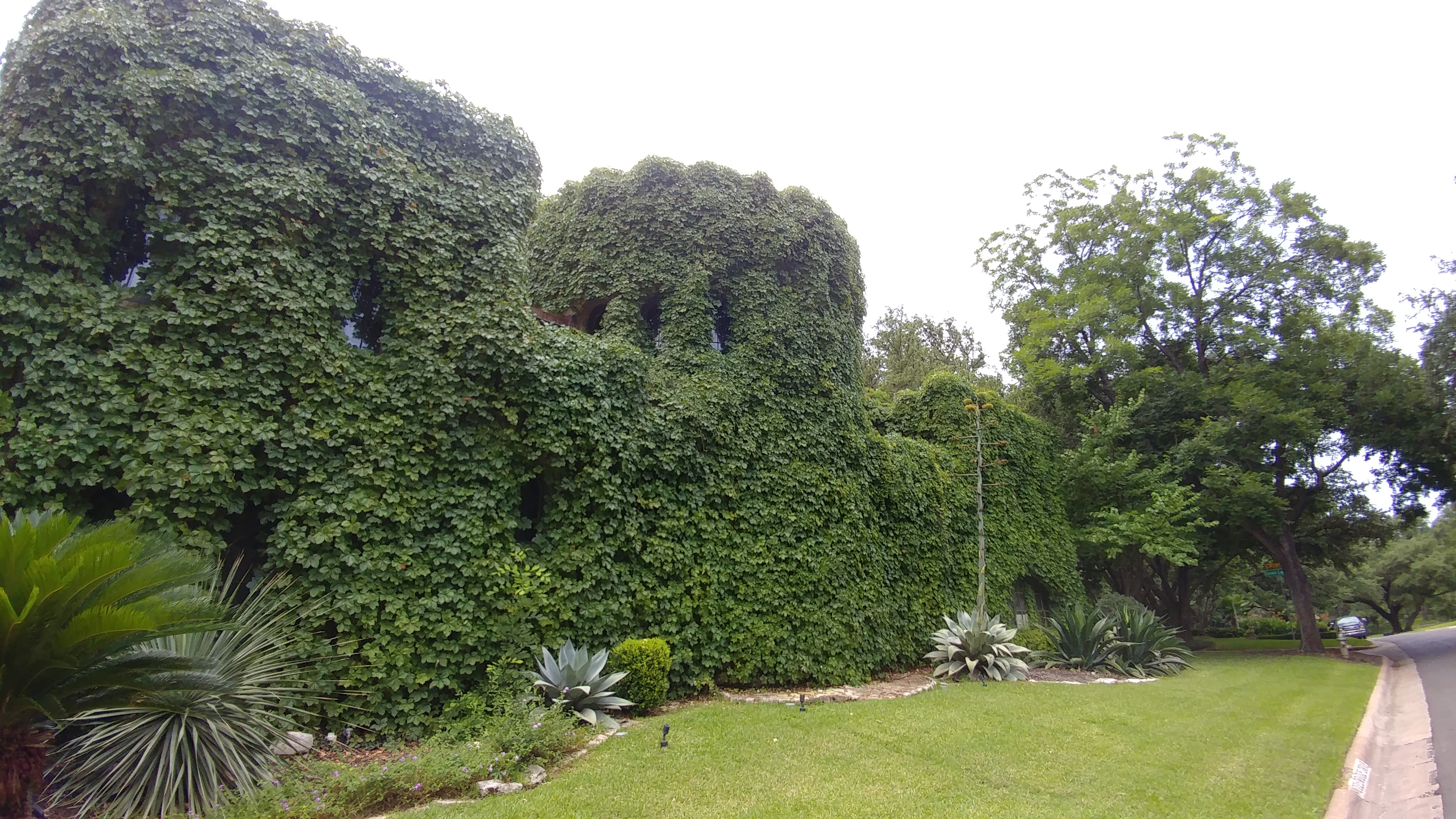
The North side of the Pemberton Castle

== History ==
In the late 1800s, what is now the neighborhood of Pemberton Heights in Austin, Travis County, Texas, was a farm owned by Attorney General John Woods Harris. The Fisher family inherited the farm and established the Austin Land Company. In 1927, the company built a bridge across Shoal Creek and began developing the area, which was originally outside the Austin city limits. Between 1927 and the early 1940s, Pemberton Heights was developed in 12 sections. In its June 1998 issue, Town & Country magazine named Pemberton Heights as one of the 25 Platinum Addresses in the United States.

== Points of interest ==
The neighborhood encompasses the western edge of the Shoal Creek Greenbelt along with a number of other "triangle parks" formed by three-way intersections including Harris Triangle Park, Jarratt Triangle Park, and Wooldridge Triangle Park.

=== Hartford Park ===
In 2016 the Pemberton Heights Neighborhood Association and the City of Austin formed a partnership in an effort to formally create a park in the half-acre green space found at the intersection of Hartford Rd, Jefferson St, and Ethridge Ave (1602 Ethridge Ave). The $350,000 needed for the park infrastructure was funded through private donations, and was used to fence in the area as well as add playscapes and landscaping to the park. The park officially opened on Mother's Day in 2018.

=== Pemberton Castle (Fisher-Gideon House) ===
Pemberton Castle was constructed in the 1890s, initially as a cylindrical water tower. In the 1920s it was converted into a castle. In 1927, the Austin Development Company acquired the property and used it as the sales office for the new Pemberton Heights subdivision. In 1937, Samuel Gideon, a University of Texas at Austin Professor of Architecture, acquired the property. In 1993, the house was a set in the movie Blank Check. The house is currently owned by Robert Rodriguez.

== Schools ==
Pemberton Heights residents are zoned for Casis Elementary School, O. Henry Middle School, and Stephen F. Austin High School. However, a considerable number of students from the area also attend private schools, most notably St. Andrew's Episcopal School and St. Stephens Episcopal School among others.

== Notable residents ==
- Greg Abbott, 48th Governor of Texas
- Edward A. Clark, United States Ambassador to Australia
- Roberta Crenshaw, American parkland preservationist and philanthropist
- David Dewhurst, 41st Lieutenant Governor of Texas
- Lloyd Doggett, United States Representative
- Steven Hicks, American businessman
- Natalie Maines, lead singer for The Chicks (née Dixie Chicks)
- Jane Y. McCallum, women's suffrage leader and Texas Secretary of State
- Robert Rodriguez, film director
- Kendra Scott, fashion and accessories designer
- John Sharp, Texas politician and chancellor of the Texas A&M University System
- Max Starcke, Lower Colorado River Authority (LCRA) leader and dam namesake
- Homer Thornberry, United States Representative and judge
- Kirk Watson, Austin mayor and Texas State Senator
- Ralph Yarborough, United States Senator
- Samuel Gideon, architectural historian
