= Bryker Woods, Austin, Texas =

Neighborhood of Austin, Texas

Neighborhood map

Bryker Woods is an older Austin, Texas, central city neighborhood developed in the 1930s, the center of which is approximately located at 30°18′17″N 97°45′06″W. It is predominantly a mix of young and old families and zoned as a single-family neighborhood composed of mostly small homes in good condition, most of which are over 50 years old. The Bryker Woods neighborhood is also part of the Old West Austin Historic District. Bryker Woods has its own elementary school, Bryker Woods Elementary, and is convenient to retail and recreational facilities.

The neighborhood has many positive features, such as its trees and park and greenbelt access, convenient location, well-built homes, and community spirit. Historic bridges span Shoal Creek connecting Bryker Woods to the University of Texas campus and the central business district. While there are no large open spaces or areas of undeveloped land within the neighborhood, the natural environment of the neighborhood is one of its greatest assets. Within the neighborhood, mature trees line the streets and provide shade for the houses. Shoal Creek forms a part of the eastern border of the neighborhood and the hike and bike trail can be followed to Pease Park and beyond. Bailey Park is also within walking distance near Seton Hospital.

Bryker Woods is located in Austin city council District 10.
