= Eeyore =

Winnie-the-Pooh character

- Winnie-the-Pooh character
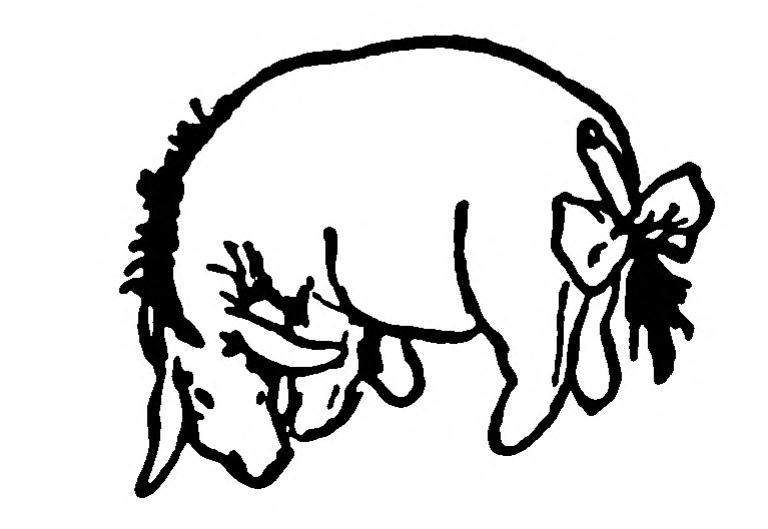
- Illustration by Ernest Howard Shepard from Winnie-the-Pooh (1926), by A. A. Milne.
- First appearance: Winnie-the-Pooh (1926)
- Created by: A. A. Milne

In-universe information
- Species: Donkey
- Gender: Male

Eeyore (/ˈiːɔːr/ EE-yore) is a fictional anthropomorphic donkey created by the English author A. A. Milne and the English illustrator E. H. Shepard. Eeyore is a character in the Winnie-the-Pooh book series, debuting in Winnie-the-Pooh (1926). The character is inspired by a stuffed toy that Milne had bought for his son Christopher Robin in Harrods department store.

Eeyore is an old, grey donkey who lives in Hundred Acre Wood. Eeyore is generally characterised as pessimistic, depressed, and anhedonic, but he also has a tender, empathetic heart and a wise, contemplative understanding of the world around him.

Eeyore has been adapted into the Winnie the Pooh media franchise created by the Walt Disney Company. Debuting in Winnie the Pooh and the Honey Tree (1966), the character has been a mainstay of the series.

== Milne character ==
=== Stuffed animal ===
Eeyore was the second stuffed animal toy acquired by Christopher Robin Milne, as a Christmas gift. The toy's drooping neck lent itself to the creation of the character's persona.

Eeyore, alongside the stuffed animals of Winnie-the-Pooh, Tigger, Kanga, and Roo were bought at Harrods store for Christopher. In 1947, the toys (including Piglet but not Roo) came to the United States in the custody of Milne's US publisher, with whom they remained until 1987. The publisher then donated the toys to the New York Public Library. They have been on display at the Main Branch of the New York Public Library in New York City ever since, and have been restored.

=== Publication ===
Eeyore first appears in Winnie-the-Pooh (1926), created by A. A. Milne and illustrated by E. H. Shepard. Eeyore appears in chapters 4, 6, 7, and 10 of Winnie-the-Pooh and is mentioned in a few others. He also appears in every chapter of The House at Pooh Corner except chapter 7. His name is an onomatopoeic representation of the braying sound made by a normal donkey, usually represented as "hee haw" in American English: the spelling with an "r" is explained by the fact that Milne and most of his intended audience spoke a non-rhotic variety of English in which the "r" in "Eeyore" is not pronounced as /r/.

Physically, Eeyore is described as an "old grey donkey". In Ernest H. Shepard's illustrations, he appears to be about chin-high to Pooh and about hip-high to Christopher Robin. He has a long, detachable tail with a pink bow on the end, of which he is very fond, but which he is also prone to losing (Owl once mistakes it for a bell-pull). Christopher Robin is able to reattach the tail with a drawing pin.

In The House at Pooh Corner, Eeyore's level of literacy is unclear. When Christopher Robin shows him the letter "A", Eeyore does not understand its meaning, knowing only that "it means learning", something he desperately wants to be seen as having, but he angrily destroys the letter after finding that Rabbit (who is quite literate) knows about it already. Nevertheless, he spells his own name "eoR" when signing the "rissolution" (resolution) that the animals give Christopher Robin as a farewell present in the final chapter. Eeyore also wrote the awkwardly-rhymed poem called "POEM", which appeared on the "rissolution", making him the only character in the Winnie-the-Pooh books other than Pooh himself who attempts to write poetry (a fact that Eeyore himself notes). When Pooh humbly declares that Eeyore's poetry is better than his own, "really believing it to be true", Eeyore vainly replies that "it was meant to be".

Eeyore has a poor opinion of most of the other animals in the Forest, describing them as having "No brain at all, some of them", "only grey fluff that's blown into their heads by mistake" (from chapter 1 of The House at Pooh Corner). Eeyore's favorite food is thistles. He lives in the southeast corner of the Hundred Acre Wood, in an area labeled "Eeyore's Gloomy Place: Rather Boggy and Sad" on the map in the Winnie-the-Pooh book. He has a stick house there called The House at Pooh Corner. Pooh and Piglet built it for him after accidentally mistaking the original house that Eeyore built for a pile of sticks. On Eeyore's birthday, he is given an empty honey jar from Pooh for keeping things in, a popped red balloon from Piglet to keep in the pot, and a note from Owl.

Eeyore is also surprisingly good at the game Poohsticks. He wins more times than anyone else when the game is played in the sixth chapter of The House at Pooh Corner.

== Adaptations ==
=== Disney adaptations ===
Eeyore
- Disney's Winnie the Pooh character
- Eeyore as depicted by Disney
- First appearance: Winnie the Pooh and the Honey Tree (1966)
- Created by: A.A. Milne
- Voiced by: Ralph Wright (1966–1983); Thurl Ravenscroft (record release); Ron Feinberg (1981); Ron Gans (1983–1986); Peter Cullen (1988–2017); Brad Garrett (1995–1997, 2018–present); Gregg Berger (video games; 1998–2006, 2011, ride, Seasons of Giving); Bud Luckey (2011 film); Jim Meskimen (Once Upon a Studio); Dylan Alvarado (Playdate with Winnie the Pooh); Chris Edgerly (May the 12th Be with You)

In-universe information
- Species: Donkey
- Gender: Male

Eeyore appears in the Winnie the Pooh cartoons produced by The Walt Disney Company. He is somewhat less caustic and sarcastic in the Disney version than in Milne's original stories. Though often a supporting character, Winnie the Pooh and a Day for Eeyore focuses on him. He is physically one of the stronger animals and is often treated as a pack animal whenever a plot calls for one. His house is regularly knocked down, but he always rebuilds it. He usually expects misfortune to happen to him, accepts it when it does and rarely even tries to prevent it. His catchphrases are "Thanks for noticin' me" and "Ohhh-kayyy". His pessimistic outlook was also shown in an encounter with Piglet, who cheerfully bade him "Good morning!" Eeyore responded, "Well, I suppose it is...for some."

Despite his depressive nature, Eeyore is capable of great compassion, whereas in the books he is more apathetic. Several episodes of The New Adventures of Winnie the Pooh exemplify this, including "Donkey for a Day", "Stripes", "Home is Where the Home is" and "Eeyi Eeyi Eeyore". Eeyore is usually one of the core group of animals, along with Pooh, Piglet, Rabbit and Tigger. Of these five, he is the most reluctant to go along with their plans or adventures, but does not oppose them because he believes it to be futile to try.

In the adaptations, Eeyore has developed a close friendship with Tigger. Despite their opposite personalities, Eeyore's passive nature and Tigger's optimism and outgoingness help them to accept each other's flaws and understand each other better. Their closeness begins at the end of Winnie the Pooh and a Day for Eeyore and continues in later works such as The New Adventures of Winnie the Pooh, A Winnie the Pooh Thanksgiving and the Winnie the Pooh film.

His tail was not always fixed to him by a nail, although Disney has chosen this as part of his permanent image. When Eeyore lost his tail, Owl found it and used it as a bell-pull beside his door before Pooh found it for Eeyore. Christopher Robin then pinned it back on. According to Winnie the Pooh and the Honey Tree, this was possible because Eeyore is full of sawdust. In Disney merchandise, Eeyore sometimes has an uncharacteristic smile. In animation, Eeyore is coloured his natural grey, though he is coloured blue with a pink muzzle in merchandising. He appears at the Walt Disney Parks and Resorts for meet and greets.

==== Casting history ====
Eeyore was voiced by Ralph Wright in the original featurettes, although Ron Feinberg filled in as his voice in the short film Winnie the Pooh Discovers the Seasons. Thurl Ravenscroft voiced him for Disneyland Records. Ron Gans took over the role for Welcome to Pooh Corner and was succeeded by Peter Cullen in The New Adventures of Winnie the Pooh through My Friends Tigger and Pooh. Although Cullen was still active when the film Winnie the Pooh was in production, Eeyore was voiced by Bud Luckey for the film. In reference to this, Cullen re-enacted a scene at BotCon to demonstrate a scene where his character Optimus Prime meets Eeyore; Cullen later returned to the role in the 2017 crossover with Doc McStuffins. Gregg Berger voiced Eeyore in video games from My Interactive Pooh to Kinect: Disneyland Adventures, plus The Many Adventures of Winnie the Pooh dark ride. Brad Garrett voices Eeyore in the 1990s video games Disney's Animated Storybook: Winnie the Pooh and the Honey Tree and Ready to Read with Pooh. Garrett reprised the role for the 2018 live-action film Christopher Robin and the animated film Ralph Breaks the Internet. In the 2023 short Once Upon a Studio, Eeyore was voiced by Jim Meskimen. In the 2024 The Simpsons Disney+ short May the 12th Be with You Chris Edgerly voiced Eeyore.

=== Winnie-the-Pooh: Blood and Honey ===
In the beginning of the 2023 horror film Winnie-the-Pooh: Blood and Honey, Eeyore was killed while the other animals were starving after Christopher Robin left for college. Eeyore's tail was used by Pooh to whip his victims.

== See also ==
- Eeyore's Birthday Party – annual festival held in Austin, Texas, in honour of the character
- List of Winnie-the-Pooh characters
