= Woodlawn (Austin, Texas) =

Historic house in Texas, United States

- U.S. National Register of Historic Places
- Recorded Texas Historic Landmark
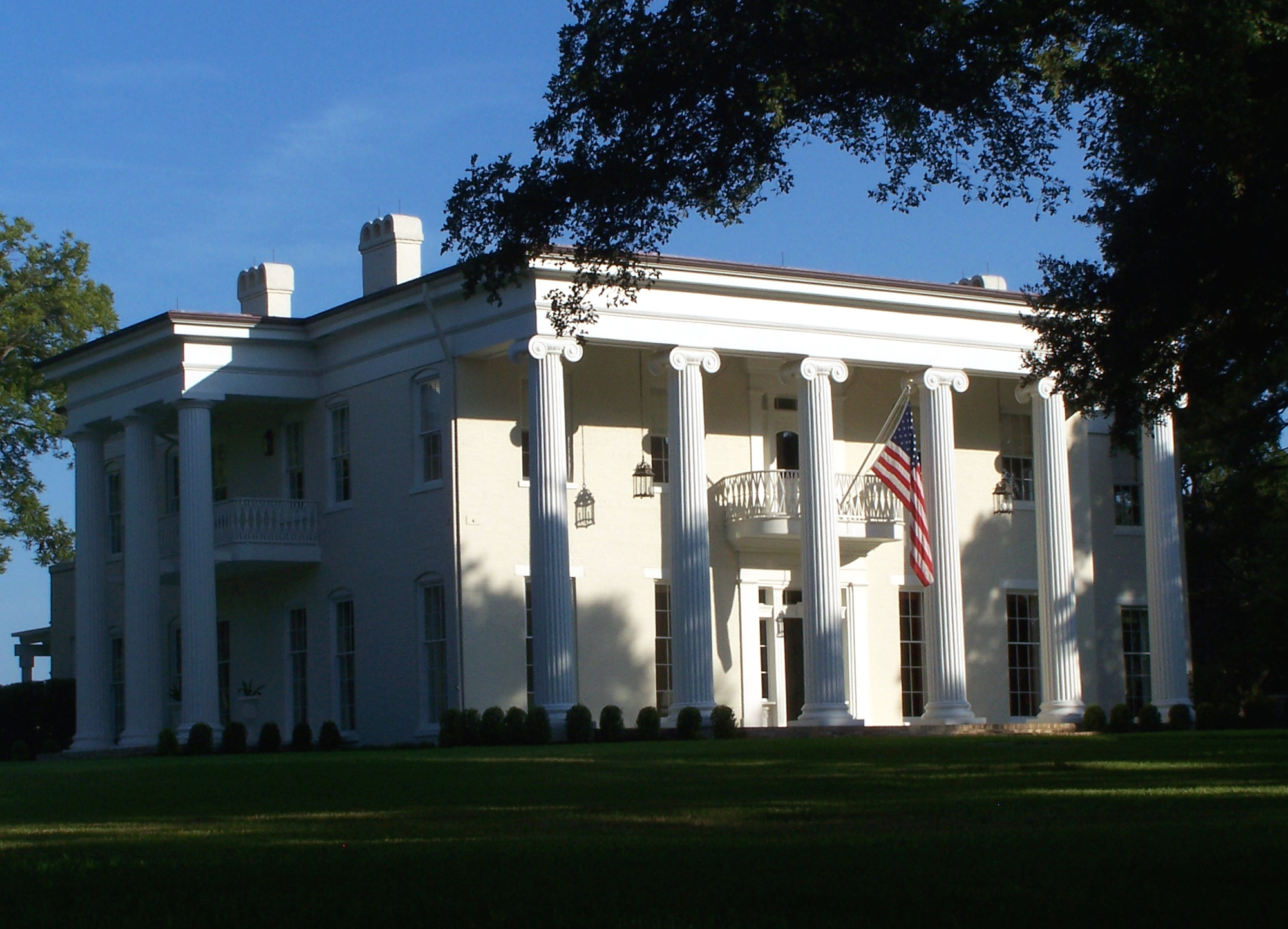
- Woodlawn in 2006.
- Location: 1606 Niles Rd; Austin, Texas, USA
- Coordinates: 30°17′14″N 97°45′29″W
- Built: 1853
- Architect: Abner Cook
- Architectural style: Greek Revival
- NRHP reference No.: 70000772
- RTHL No.: 15303

Significant dates
- Added to NRHP: August 25, 1970
- Designated RTHL: 1962

Woodlawn, also known as the Pease Mansion as well as Governor Shivers’ Mansion, is a pre-Civil War mansion located at 30.2871° -97.7581° in Austin, Texas. The Greek Revival style house was owned by two Texas governors. Some notable people that have visited the mansion include Sam Houston, General George Custer, Elisabet Ney, Will Rogers, and Edith Head. Woodlawn was added to the National Register of Historic Places on August 25, 1970. Although the house faces Pease Rd, it has two separate entrances. One entrance is off Niles Rd and the other is off of Northumberland Rd, which is where the mailbox is located.

== History ==
The site of Woodlawn originally consisted of 365 acres (1.48 km^{2}) in West Austin. Then Texas State Comptroller James Shaw commissioned master builder Abner H. Cook (who also designed the Texas Governor's Mansion) to build a house for him and his fiancée. Shaw's fiancée later broke off the engagement, but Shaw soon found another woman that he married and they lived in the house, which was completed in 1853.

Tragedy struck when Shaw's child died at the age of two and his wife died a few months later. Shaw sold the estate to Texas governor Elisha M. Pease and his wife Lucadia Christiane Niles Pease in 1857 and Shaw moved to Galveston. The Peases named the estate Woodlawn. Pease developed most of the land surrounding Woodlawn into the present-day neighborhood of Enfield.

Four generations of the Pease family lived at Woodlawn until 1957 when Niles Graham sold the house and its three remaining acres to outgoing Texas governor Allan Shivers and his wife Marialice Shary Shivers. The Shivers moved into Woodlawn on January 15, 1957, almost 100 years to the day when the Peases first moved into Woodlawn.

On October 27, 1975, the Shivers donated Woodlawn to the University of Texas at Austin and University of Texas–Pan American with the stipulation that they could live there until their deaths (see Life estate). Allan Shivers died in 1985 and Marialice died on September 29, 1996. The University of Texas sold Woodlawn to the State of Texas in December, 1997 for $2.6 million. The proceeds endowed the Allan Shivers Chair in Law and Banking at the University of Texas School of Law and the Marialice Shivers Chair in Fine Arts at the University of Texas–Pan American.

The state bought Woodlawn as Texas Lieutenant Governor Bob Bullock dreamed of making it the new Texas Governor's Mansion. Bullock died in 1999 and his dream passed with him. Since it no longer had a purpose for the estate and it was expensive to maintain, the State of Texas put Woodlawn up for sale in 2002 by sealed bid. Actress Sandra Bullock reportedly toured the home as a possible buyer but did not bid on it. Only one bid was received and it was not credible. The state then began to contact interested buyers. Austin investor and entrepreneur Jeff Sandefer signed a contract to purchase the estate in May 2002.

Today, Woodlawn is the centerpiece of the Old West Austin Historic District which consists mostly of land formerly owned by the Pease family.
