= Pease Park =

Urban park in Austin, Texas

Pease District Park
- Pease Park
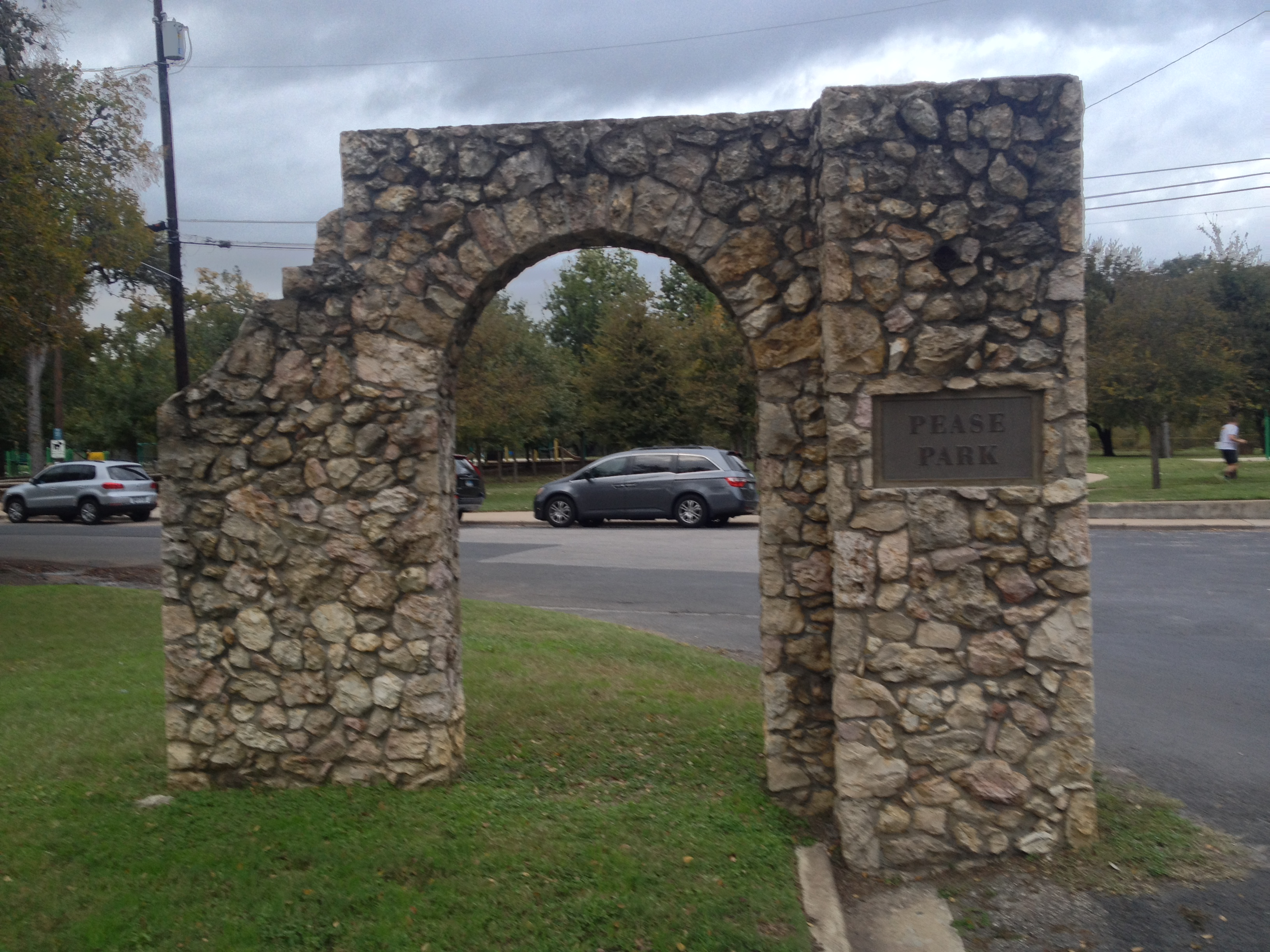
- One of the stone gates at the south end of Pease Park
- Type: Public park
- Location: 1100 Kingsbury St; Austin, Texas 78703
- Coordinates: 30°16′55″N 97°45′7″W
- Area: 42 acres (17 ha)
- Created: 1875

Pease Park (officially Pease District Park) is an urban park in central Austin, Texas. Paralleling Shoal Creek west of downtown, the park is frequented by University of Texas at Austin and Long-View Micro School students and, formerly, by disc golf enthusiasts. Every spring it plays host to the annual Eeyore's Birthday Party celebration, a favorite event for Austin's hippie subculture dating back to the 1960s.

== History ==
The parcel of land that is now Pease Park was named after and donated to the city of Austin by Texas Governor Elisha M. Pease and his wife in 1875. The land remained undeveloped until the city and civic organizations cooperated to beautify the park in 1926, building entrance gates, restrooms, and other amenities. Further improvements were made later, including the installation of a group of long concrete picnic tables by the Civilian Conservation Corps in the 1930s and the construction of a hike-and-bike trail connecting the park to the city's larger trail network in the 1950s.

In 2015, the Texas Recreation and Parks Society designated Pease Park a Lone Star Legacy Park.

On October 16, 2019 ground broke on the US$15 million dollar 10 acres Kingsbury Commons, the most significant upgrade to Pease Park in a century, as part of a larger Master Plan. Construction concluded in June 2021.

In March 2024, Thomas Dambo constructed a wooden troll at Pease Park. Dambo flew, with his family, to Austin and worked on the troll, named Malin, for two weeks, before returning to his home country of Denmark.

The cost of the installation was less than $350,000 USD and was paid for by private donors.

On May 21, 2026, Malin burned down.

== Eeyore's Birthday Party ==
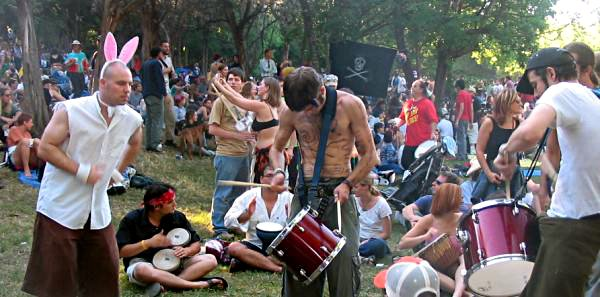
A small drum circle at Eeyore's Birthday Party. Some drum circles at this event can have hundreds of drummers and dancers.

Since 1974, Pease Park has hosted Austin's annual Eeyore's Birthday Party event, with music, costumes, games, and drum circles. The festival, in honor of the character from A. A. Milne's Winnie-the-Pooh stories, is typically attended by thousands, filling the park with activities.

== Disc golf course ==
Pease Park was the site of a popular disc golf course running along Shoal Creek. On January 1, 2011, the park's disc golf course was closed indefinitely due to environmental impact problems.
