= True/False Film Festival =

Annual documentary film festival in Columbia, Missouri, U.S.

Coordinates: 38.951393°N 92.327706°W

True/False Film Fest
- Location: Columbia, Missouri, United States
- Hosted by: The Ragtag Film Society
- Festival date: February 27, 2025-March 2, 2025
- Language: English
- Website: www.truefalse.org

True/False Film Fest is an annual documentary film festival that takes place in Columbia, Missouri. The Fest occurs on the first weekend in March (sometimes beginning in late February), with films being shown from Thursday evening to Sunday night. Films are screened at multiple locations around downtown Columbia, including Ragtag Cinema, Jesse Hall, Missouri Theatre Center for the Arts, The Picturehouse, The Blue Note, The Globe, Rhynsburger Theater and the Forrest Theater in the Tiger Hotel. It offers one award each year, the True Vision Award.

True/False Film Fest and Ragtag Cinema are programs of the 501(c)(3) not-for-profit organization, the Ragtag Film Society. Ragtag Film Society seeks to champion independent film and media art and to serve film communities both locally and globally.

== History ==
True/False was started by Paul Sturtz and David Wilson (who also founded the Ragtag Cinema) in February 2004. In 2006, it won the Riverfront Times best film festival. In 2008, the film fest lost 1,200 seats due to the renovation work taking place at the Missouri Theatre. To adjust for the loss, the fest expanded beyond its usual boundaries in order to take advantage of additional screens at Macklanburg Cinema, Windsor Cinema, and The Den on the campus of Stephens College. After the completion of its restoration, the historic Missouri Theatre was once again a featured venue for the 2009 edition of the fest. The True/False Film Fest and Stephens College amicably ended their partnership after the 2011 fest, and Stephens College continued to host the annual Citizen Jane Film Festival through its demise in 2018.

The 2021 edition of the festival was moved to outdoor venues in nearby Stephens Lake Park due to the COVID-19 pandemic. In addition to moving the event outdoors, they also brought festival boxes straight to the doors of pass holders. The event made its return to downtown Columbia setting 2022.

== Growth ==
The first True/False Film Festival in 2004 sold 4,200 tickets and the fest has since experienced rapid growth, increasing attendance by 25% or more in all but two years through its first decade. Since then, the festival has increased attendance each year with the exception of 2014, which saw a 3% decrease amid a winter snowstorm. The latest event in 2017 saw another record high in ticket sales, nearly 3,000 more than 2016.

Over the years, the festival has expanded its presentation of other arts, including music and decorative art. The event kicks off with a parade, the "March March," and ends with "Buskers Last Stand," in which many of the invited musicians come together for a closing performance. It encourages additional attendee involvement through participatory events like the "True Life 5K run," and the "Gimme Truth!" game show. The festival has risen from its meager origins to earn praise from both the Chicago Tribune and Los Angeles Times.

In 2019, the festival received thousands of submissions and sold over 54,000 tickets, bringing thousands of people to mid-Missouri from around the world. The festival is sponsored by almost every downtown store, restaurant and bar, and has multiple educational events such as Camp True/False and BOATS for both local & national high schools, year-long film programs, and more.

== Education ==
=== Media Literacy Initiative ===
In early 2016, Columbia Public Schools, Ragtag Film Society, and the Columbia Public Schools Foundation announced a new, landmark multi-year partnership that brings together film, the CPS curriculum, and teacher training. The Media Literacy initiative is a year-round program that supports teacher efforts to incorporate more film and multimedia into their classrooms.

The program champions the belief that as students catapult into a world of ever-changing media, distribution platforms, and news outlets, the skills to be thoughtful, critical consumers of media must grow. Students deserve the tools to think consciously about the ways their world is presented to them and the ways they present their world. The primary goals are to increase the presence of film in core classrooms, help teachers and students learn to read film as text, and to cultivate and enhance critical thinking skills as teachers and students practice analyzing new media.

=== Camp True/False ===
Camp True/False brings high school students Insider access to the festival for a weekend of exciting films, music, art, conversations, and workshops. Camp True/False convenes before the festival to discuss relevant issues, to share research, and to plot their course.

Participating students have a chance to meet the founders of the festival, and to meet with the directors of the films that are screening at the festival in a private and personal manner. The camp is completely free for the students, who are selected through an application process in November.

All Columbian Public Schools participate, as well as 10 out-of-town schools; 4 of those being out-of-state. In 2019, the camp included nearly 80 high schoolers, 30 local students and 50 students from national areas. Students from Saint Louis, Jefferson City, North Carolina, New Mexico, and more attended the 4 day camp. Applications are typically due about a month before the festival starts.

=== DIY Day ===
On the Friday morning of the Fest, 10th graders from across all four Columbia public high schools take buses to a True/False venue where their nonfiction cinema & art experience begins. The students watch buskers and a festival film (listed below), and students have the opportunity to participate in a Q&A with the filmmaker. Afterward, 200 self-selected students attend interactive artist workshops and participate in the anyone-can-join March parade.

==== Educational Screening Films ====
The Educational Screenings are a special screening for local high school sophomores as a field trip to watch one film from the festival for free.

2025: Time Bomb Y2K, dir. Brian Becker & Marley McDonald

2024: Going Varsity in Mariachi, dir. Alejandra Vazquez & Sam Osborn

2023: Let the Little Light Shine, dir. Kevin Shaw

2022: Step, dir. Amanda Lipitz

2021: Undefeated, dir. Daniel Lindsay and T.J. Martin

2020: The Order of Myths, dir. Margaret Brown

2019: Amazing Grace, guest Dr. King

2018: Won't You Be My Neighbor?, dir. Morgan Neville

2017: I Am Not Your Negro, dir. Raoul Peck

2016: The Bad Kids, dir. Keith Fulton & Lou Pepe

2015: What Happened Miss Simone?, dir. Liz Garbus

2014: Particle Fever, dir. Mark Levinson

2013: Crash Reel dir. Lucy Walker

== Films ==
=== 2017 ===
Title	Director (s)	Year	Runtime	Type	Program
Abacus: Small Enough to Jail	Steve James	2017	88 min	Feature	
All Good Things	Chloe Domont	2017	26 min	Short	The New Family
Antonio, Dashing Antonio	Ana Maria Gomez	2017	42 min	Short	Edith + Eddie + Antonio
Balloonfest	Nathan Truesdell	2017	6 min	Short	The World Laughs With You
Best of Luck with the Wall	Josh Begley	2017	7 min	Short	Making Good Neighbors
Brief History of Princess X	Gabriel Abrantes		7 min	Short	
Brimstone & Glory	Viktor Jakovleski	2017	67 min	Feature	
Casting JonBenet	Kitty Green	2017	80 min	Feature	
The Challenge	Yuri Ancarani	2016	75 min	Feature	
Commodity City	Jessica Kingdon	2016	10 min	Short	
Communion	Anna Zamecka	2016	77 min	Feature	
Deer Squad: The Movie	Pipus Larsen, Kenneth Gug, & Scott J. Ross	2017	5 min	Short	
Describe What You Heard	Joe Callander & Jason Tippet	2017	3 min	Short	
Did You Wonder Who Fired the Gun?	Travis Wilkerson	2017	90 min	Feature	
Dina	Dan Sickles & Antonio Santini	2017	102 min	Feature	
Distant Constellation	Shevaun Mizrahi	2017	80 min	Feature	
The Diver	Esteban Arrangoiz	2015	16 min	Short	
Donkeyote	Chico Pereira	2017	86 min	Feature	
Edith+Eddie	Laura Checkoway	2017	30 min	Short	
Fares	Thora Lorentzen	2016	21 min	Short	
Fish Story	Charlie Lyne	2017	12 min	Short	
The Force	Peter Nicks	2017	93 min	Feature	
The Graduation	Claire Simon	2016	120 min	Feature	
The Grown-Ups	Maite Alberdi	2016	83 min	Feature	
Gulîstan, Land of Roses	Zaynê Akyol	2016	84 min	Feature	
Happy Happy Baby	Jan Soldat	2017	22 min	Short	
The Hollow Coin	Frank Heath	2016	13 min	Short	
HyperNormalisation	Adam Curtis	2016	187 min	Feature	
I Am Not Your Negro	Raoul Peck	2016	93 min	Feature	
If Only There Were Peace	Carmine Grimaldi & Deniz Tortum	2017	30 min	Short	
Koropa	Laura Henno	2016	19 min	Short	
Lindy Lou, Juror Number 2	Florent Vassault	2017	84 min	Feature	
Long Strange Trip	Amir Bar-Lev	2017	259 min	Feature	
LoveTrue	Alma Har'el	2016	82 min	Feature	
Manifesto	Julian Rosefeldt	2017	90 min	Feature	
Mimi	Claire Simon	2003	105 min	Feature	True Vision
Miss Kiet's Children	Petra Lataster-Czisch & Peter Lataster	2016	114 min	Feature	
My Daughter Nora	Jasna Krajinovic	2016	16 min	Short	
No Man's Land	David Byars	2017	84 min	Feature	
one of the roughs, a kosmos	Carmine Grimaldi	2016	21 min	Short	
Polonaise	Agnieszka Elbanowska	2016	16 min	Short	
Project X	Laura Poitras & Henrik Moltke	2016	10 min	Short	
Quest	Jonathan Olshefski	2017	105 min	Feature	
The Rabbit Hunt	Patrick Bresnan	2017	12 min	Short	
Railway Sleepers	Sompot Chidgasornpongse	2016	102 min	Feature	
Rat Film	Theo Anthony	2016	87 min	Feature	
Récréations	Claire Simon	1992	54 min	Feature	True Vision
The Road Movie	Dmitrii Kalashnikov	2016	72 min	Feature	
Safari	Ulrich Seidl	2016	90 min	Feature	
Servicing Guide: Fannie Mae Single Family, Subpart A4-2.1-02, Property Inspection Vendor Management and Oversight (11/12/2014)	Carmine Grimaldi	2016	13 min	Short	
Step	Amanda Lipitz	2017	83 min	Feature	
Still Tomorrow	FAN Jian	2016	88 min	Feature	
Stranger in Paradise	Guido Hendrikx	2016	77 min	Feature	
Strong Island	Yance Ford	2017	107 min	Feature	
Venus	Lea Glob & Mette Carla Albrechtsen	2016	80 min	Feature	
Whose Streets?	Sabaah Folayan	2016	104 min	Feature	

=== 2018 ===
Title	Director (s)	Year	Runtime	Type	Program
Adriana's Pact	Lissette Orozco	2017	96 min	Feature	
América	Erick Stoll & Chase Whiteside	2018	75 min	Feature	
American Animals	Bart Layton	2018	116 min	Feature	
António e Catarina	Cristina Haneș	2017	40 min	Feature	
Artemio	Sandra Luz López Barroso	2017	48 min	Feature	
The Atomic Soldiers	Morgan Knibbe	2018	23 min	Short	
Baby Brother	Kamau Bilal	2018	14 min	Short	
Bisbee '17	Robert Greene	2018	118 min	Feature	
Black Mother	Khalik Allah	2018	77 min	Feature	
La Bouche	Camilo Restrepo	2017	19 min	Short	
Caniba	Verena Paravel & Lucien Castaing-Taylor	2017	97 min	Feature	
Combat Obscura	Miles Lagoze	2018	67 min	Feature	
Community Patrol	Andrew James	2018	13 min	Short	
Concussion Protocol	Josh Begley	2018	6 min	Short	
Crime + Punishment	Stephen Maing	2018	112 min	Feature	
Dessert-Disaster	Alison Nguyen	2017	2 min	Short	
Disintegration 93-96	Miko Revereza	2017	6 min	Short	
Duelo	Alejandro Alonso	2017	12 min	Short	
Durango	Matt Sukkar	2017	14 min	Short	
The Family	Rok Biček	2017	106 min	Feature	
Flight of a Bullet	Beata Bubenec	2017	81 min	Feature	
La Flor de la Vida	Adriana Loeff & Claudia Abend	2017	86 min	Feature	
Gabriel and the Mountain	Fellipe Barbosa	2017	131 min	Feature	
Grace Jones: Bloodlight and Bami	Sophie Fiennes	2017	115 min	Feature	
Graven Image	Sierra Pettengill	2017	11 min	Short	
Hale County This Morning, This Evening	RaMell Ross	2018	76 min	Feature	
Handsworth Songs	John Akomfrah	1986	61 min	Feature	Neither/Nor
John 746	Ana Vijdea	2017	34 min	Short	
Kinshasa Makambo	Dieudo Hamadi	2018	75 min	Feature	
Las Nubes	Juan Pablo González	2018	21 min	Short	
Liminals	Jeremy Shaw	2017	31 min	Short	
Love Means Zero	Jason Kohn	2018	89 min	Feature	
Lovers of the Night	Anna Frances Ewert	2017	57 min	Feature	
Makala	Emmanuel Gras	2017	96 min	Feature	
The Making and Unmaking of the Earth	Jessica Bardsley	2018	17 min	Short	
MATANGI / MAYA / M.I.A.	Steve Loveridge	2018	96 min	Feature	
Mini Miss	Rachel Daisy Ellis	2018	16 min	Short	
Mon Amour, Mon Ami	Adriano Valerio	2017	16 min	Short	
National Diploma	Dieudo Hamadi	2014	92 min	Feature	True Vision Award Repertory Series
The Next Guardian	Dorottya Zurbó & Arun Bhattarai	2017	74 min	Feature	
Of Fathers and Sons	Talal Derki	2017	98 min	Feature	
Our New President	Maxim Pozdorovkin	2018	78 min	Feature	
Palenque	Sebastián Pinzón Silva	2017	25 min	Short	
Personal Truth	Charlie Lyne	2017	18 min	Short	
The Price of Everything	Nathaniel Kahn	2018	98 min	Feature	
Playing Men	Matjaž Ivanišin	2017	61 min	Feature	
Primas	Laura Bari	2017	100 min	Feature	True Life Fund
Pumpkin Movie	Sophy Romvari	2017	10 min	Short	
Pure Difference	Byron Peters	2017	12 min	Short	
The Rider	Chloé Zhao	2017	105 min	Feature	
Self-Portrait: Birth in 47 km	ZHANG Mengqi	2016	101 min	Feature	
SHAKEDOWN	Leilah Weinraub	2018	69 min	Feature	
Shirkers	Sandi Tan	2018	96 min	Feature	
Taming the Horse	GU Tao	2017	129 min	Feature	
The Task	Leigh Ledare	2017	120 min	Feature	
Testament	John Akomfrah	1988	79 min	Feature	Neither/Nor
They Just Come and Go	Boris Poljak	2017	20 min	Short	
Three Identical Strangers	Tim Wardle	2018	96 min	Feature	
The Trader	Tamta Gabrichidze	2017	22 min	Short	
Twilight City	Reece Auguiste	1989	53 min	Feature	Neither/Nor
Voices of the Sea	Kim Hopkins	2018	99 min	Feature	
The Water Slide	Nathan Truesdell	2018	10 min	Short	
Westwood	Lorna Tucker	2018	83 min	Feature	
Who Needs a Heart?	John Akomfrah	1991	78 min	Feature	Neither/Nor
Won't You Be My Neighbor?	Morgan Neville	2018	94 min	Feature	

=== 2019 ===
Title	Director (s)	Year	Runtime	Type	Program
Amazing Grace	Sydney Pollack	2018	87 min	Feature	
American Factory	Steven Bognar & Julia Reichert	2019	115 min	Feature	
Apollo 11	Todd Douglas Miller	2019	93 min	Feature	
Atman	Pirjo Honkasalo	1997	76 min	Feature	Neither/Nor
Black 14	Darius Clark Monroe	2018	15 min	Short	
Caballerango	Juan Pablo González	2018	60 min	Feature	
Celebration	Olivier Meyrou	2018	73 min	Feature	
The Changing Same	Michèle Stephenson & Joe Brewster	2018	21 min	Short	
Chez Jolie Coiffure	Rosine Mbakam	2018	70 min	Feature	
Chinese Portrait	WANG Xiaoshuai	2018	79 min	Feature	
Cold Case Hammarskjöld	Mads Brügger	2019	123 min	Feature	
The Commons	Suki Hawley & Michael Galinsky	2019	71 min	Feature	
Crannog	Isa Rao	2018	15 min	Short	
Dark Suns	Julien Élie	2018	151 min	Feature	
The Edge of Democracy	Petra Costa	2019	120 min	Feature	
Djo	Laura Henno	2018	12 min	Short	
Dramatic and Mild	Nastia Korkia	2018	6 min	Short	
Due	Riccardo Giacconi	2017	17 min	Short	
every dog has its day	Alison Nguyen	2019	6 min	Short	
Fainting Spells	Sky Hopinka	2018	11 min	Short	
Finding Frances	Nathan Fielder	2017	84 min	Feature	
The Game	Marine de Contes	2018	53 min	Feature	
Ghosts of Sugar Land	Bassam Tariq	2019	21 min	Short	
Goodbye Thelma	Jessica Bardsley	2019	14 min	Short	
The Grand Bizarre	Jodie Mack	2018	61 min	Feature	
The Harvesters	Derek Howard	2018	6 min	Short	
Home, Sweet Home	ISE Shinichi	2018	110 min	Feature	
The Hottest August	Brett Story	2019	92 min	Feature	
I Signed the Petition	Mahdi Fleifel	2018	10 min	Short	
Island of the Hungry Ghosts	Gabrielle Brady	2018	98 min	Feature	
Knock Down the House	Rachel Lears	2019	85 min	Feature	
Landless	Camila Freitas	2019	110 min	Feature	
Lasting Marks	Charlie Lyne	2018	14 min	Short	
Let It Burn	Maíra Bühler	2019	82 min	Feature	
The Lost Head and the Bird	Sohrab Hura	2018	10 min	Short	
The Magic Life of V	Tonislav Hristov	2019	85 min	Feature	
The Men Behind the Wall	Inés Moldavsky	2018	28 min	Short	
Midnight in Paris	Roni Moore & James Blagden	2019	75 min	Feature	
Midnight Traveler	Hassan Fazili	2019	87 min	Feature	
Mike Wallace is Here	Avi Belkin	2019	86 min	Feature	
Mysterion	Pirjo Honkasalo	1991	94 min	Feature	Neither/Nor
Mr. SOUL!	Melissa Haizlip & Sam Pollard	2018	115 min	Feature	
The Naked Room	Nuria Ibáñez Castañeda	2013	70 min	Feature	
No data plan	Miko Revereza	2019	70 min	Feature	
‘Now something is slowly changing’	mint film office	2018	105 min	Feature	
One Child Nation	Nanfu Wang & Jialing Zhang	2019	89 min	Feature	
Our Time (Nuestro Tiempo)	Carlos Reygadas	2018	173 min	Feature	
Over the Rainbow	Jeffrey Peixoto	2019	71 min	Feature	
Reason	Anand Patwardhan	2018	235 min	Feature	
Segunda Vez	Dora Garcia	2018	94 min	Feature	
The Tightrope	Nuria Ibáñez Castañeda	2009	80 min	Feature	
Treasure Island	Guillaume Brac	2018	97 min	Feature	
Untitled Amazing Johnathan Documentary	Ben Berman	2019	91 min	Feature	
Up the Mountain	Zhang Yang	2018	126 min	Feature	
Vesuvius at Home	Christin Turner	2019	14 min	Short	
Vever (for Barbara)	Deborah Stratman	2018	12 min	Short	
Walled/Unwalled	Lawrence Abu Hamdan	2018	20 min	Short	
A Wild Stream	Nuria Ibáñez Castañeda	2018	72 min	Feature	True Vision

=== 2020 ===
Title	Director (s)	Year	Runtime	Type	Program
45365	Bill & Turner Ross	2009	94 min	Feature	
Aswang	Alyx Ayn Arumpac	2019	85 min	Feature	
Aurora	Everlane Moraes	2018	16 min	Short	
Bloody Nose, Empty Pockets	Bill & Turner Ross	2020	98 min	Feature	True Vision
Boys State	Amanda McBaine & Jesse Moss	2020	109 min	Feature	
Catskin	Ina Luchsperger	2019	58 min	Feature	
City So Real	Steve James	2020	240 min	Feature	
Civil War Surveillance Poems (Part 1)	Mitch McCabe	2019	15 min	Short	
Collective	Alexander Nanau	2019	109 min	Feature	
Crestone	Marnie Ellen Hertzler	2020	73 min	Feature	
Crip Camp	James LeBrecht & Nicole Newnham	2019	102 min	Feature	
Dadli	Shabier Kirchner	2018	15 min	Short	
Dick Johnson Is Dead	Kirsten Johnson	2020	89 min	Feature	
Distancing	Miko Revereza	2020	10 min	Short	
Dope Is Death	Mia Donovan	2020	78 min	Feature	
Down a Dark Stairwell	Ursula Liang	2020	83 min	Feature	
The Faculties	Eloísa Solaas	2019	77 min	Feature	
Faith	Valentina Pedicini	2019	93 min	Feature	
Feels Good Man	Arthur Jones	2020	95 min	Feature	
The Giverny Document	Ja'Tovia Gary	2019	42 min	Feature	
Good Ended Happily	Basir Mahmood	2019	13 min	Short	
Hampton	Kevin Jerome Everson & Claudrena Harold	2019	8 min	Short	
How to Disappear	Robin Klengel, Leonhard Müllner, Michael Stumpf	2020	21 min	Short	
IWOW I Walk on Water	Khalik Allah	2020	197 min	Feature	
JESA	Kyungwon Song	2019	6 min	Short	
Lost Three Make One Found	Atsushi Kuwayama	2019	27 min	Short	
Love It/Leave It	Tom Palazzolo	1973	15 min	Short	
Lovemobil	Elke Margarete Lehrenkrauss	2019	106 min	Feature	
A Machine to Live In	Yoni Goldstein & Meredith Zielke	2020	87 min	Feature	
małni—towards the ocean, towards the shore	Sky Hopinka	2020	81 min	Feature	
Mayor	David Osit	2020	87 min	Feature	
The Metamorphosis of Birds	Catarina Vasconcelos	2020	101 min	Feature	
The Mole Agent	Maite Alberdi	2020	90 min	Feature	
Mucho Mucho Amor	Cristina Constantini & Kareem Tabsch	2020	96 min	Feature	
Nofinofy	Michaël Andrianaly	2020	73 min	Feature	
Partial Differential Equation	Kevin Jerome Everson	2020	8 min	Short	
Pier Kids	Elegance Bratton	2019	84 min	Feature	
Recklessly Eyeballing	Christopher Harris	2004	14 min	Short	
Ridge	John Skoog	2019	70 min	Feature	
San Vittore	Yuri Ancarani	2019	12 min	Short	
The Sea, The Stars, A Landscape	Alison O'Daniel	2019	18 min	Short	
Secret Screening Short		2019	24 min	Short	
See You Next Time	Crystal Kayiza	2020	6 min	Short	
Seven Years in May	Affonso Uchoa	2019	42 min	Feature	
Shortcuts	Daniela Delgado Viteri	2019	18 min	Short	
Smoke Gets In Your Eyes	Riccardo Giacconi, Paolo Pennuti, Mirko Fabbri	2019	12 min	Short	
So Late So Soon	Daniel Hymanson	2020	70 min	Feature	
Some Kind of Heaven	Lance Oppenheim	2020	81 min	Feature	
A Song About Love	Rikki Wright	2019	14 min	Short	
Specialised Technique	Onyeka Igwe	2019	7 min	Short	
The Spirit Keepers of Makuta'ay	Yen-Chao Lin	2019	11 min	Short	
Spit on the Broom	Madeleine Hunt-Ehrlich	2019	11 min	Short	
Sunless Shadows	Mehrdad Oskouei	2019	74 min	Feature	
A Supa Special Wakaliwood Event for All True/False Commandos	IGG Nabwana	2020	61 min	Feature	
Talking About Trees	Suhaib Gasmelbari	2019	93 min	Feature	
Tchoupitoulas	Bill & Turner Ross	2012	82 min	Feature	
That Cloud Never Left	Yashaswini Raghunandan	2019	66 min	Feature	
This Is an Address	Sasha Wortzel	2019	17 min	Short	
Those That, At a Distance, Resemble Another	Jessica Sarah Rinland	2019	65 min	Feature	
Time	Garrett Bradley	2020	85 min	Feature	
To the North (Part 2)	Kelman Duran	2016	23 min	Short	
Unskinned	Inês Gil	2019	76 min	Feature	
Up at Night	Nelson Makengo	2019	21 min	Short	
The Viewing Booth	Ra’anan Alexandrowicz	2019	70 min	Feature	
Welcome to Chechnya	David France	2020	107 min	Feature	
what remains/geriye kalanlar	belit sağ	2019	7 min	Short	
When two or three	Carmine Grimaldi	2019	20 min	Short	

=== 2021 ===
Title	Director (s)	Year	Runtime	Type	Program
.srt	Africanus Okokon	2020	9 min	Short	
All Light, Everywhere	Theo Anthony	2021	106 min	Feature	
The Bodies	Eloy Domínguez Serén	2020	11 min	Short	
Brontosaurus	Jack Dunphy	2020	8 min	Short	
Club Quarantine	Aurora Brachman	2020	7 min	Short	
The Cut	Zac Manuel	2020	7 min	Short	
Das Spiel	Roman Hodel	2020	17 min	Short	
Delphine's Prayers	Rosine Mbakam	2020	90 min	Feature	
Department of Injustice	Travis Wood & Chloe Gbai	2020	6 min	Short	
Dirty Feathers	Carlos Alfonso Corral	2021	75 min	Feature	
Faya Dayi	Jessica Beshir	2021	120 min	Feature	
Fire Season	Quinn Else	2020	7 min	Short	
The Flooded House	Lucía Malandro & Daniel D. Saucedo	2020	14 min	Short	
From the Wild Sea	Robin Petré	2021	78 min	Feature	
The Golden Buttons	Alex Evstigneev	2020	20 min	Short	
The Grocer's Son, the Mayor, the Village and the World	Claire Simon	2020	110 min	Feature	
Halpate	Adam Piron & Adam Khalil	2020	14 min	Short	
Homage to the Work of Philip Henry Gosse	Pablo Weber	2020	22 min	Short	
Homeroom	Peter Nicks	2021	90 min	Feature	
The I and S of Lives	Kevin Jerome Everson	2021	7 min	Short	
Inside the Red Brick Wall	HK Documentary Filmmakers	2021	88 min	Feature	
Lemongrass Girl	Pom Bunsermvicha	2021	17 min	Short	
Maat Means Land	Fox Maxy	2020	30 min	Short	
My Own Landscape	Antoine Chapon	2020	18 min	Short	
No Kings	Emilia Mello	2020	85 min	Feature	
O arrais do mar	Elisa Celda	2020	18 min	Short	
Petit Samedi	Paloma Sermon-Dai	2020	75 min	Feature	
The Rain Will Never Stop	Alina Gorlova	2020	103 min	Feature	
Red Taxi	Anonymous	2020	14 min	Short	
The Rifleman	Sierra Pettengill	2020	18 min	Short	
Rock Bottom Riser	Fern Silva	2021	70 min	Feature	
Sabaya	Hogir Hirori	2021	93 min	Feature	
Songs That Flood the River	German Adolfo Arango	2021	75 min	Feature	
Spirits and Rocks: An Azorean Myth	Aylin Gökmen	2020	14 min	Short	
Summer of Soul	Ahmir "Questlove" Thompson	2021	117 min	Feature	
The Truth About Hastings	Dan Schneidkraut	2021	10 min	Short	
The Two Faces of a Bamiléké Woman	Rosine Mbakam	2018	76 min	Feature	
Users	Natalia Almada	2021	81 min	Feature	
VO	Nicolas Gourault	2020	17 min	Short	
Why Don't You Eat More?	George Du; Sinclair Neff	2020	4 min	Short	

=== 2022 ===
Title	Director (s)	Year	Runtime	Type	Program
2nd Chance	Ramin Bahrani	2022	89 min	Feature	
Abisal	Alejandro Alonso	2021	30 min	Short	
Açucena	Isaac Donato	2021	71 min	Feature	
After Sherman	Jon-Sesrie Goff	2021	88 min	Feature	
The Balcony Movie	Paweł Łoziński	2021	100 min	Feature	
Brotherhood	Francesco Montagner	2021	97 min	Feature	
Caballerango	Juan Pablo González	2018	60 min	Feature	
Canoa: A Shameful Memory	Felipe Cazals	1976	115 min	Feature	
Children of the Mist	HÀ Lệ Diễm	2021	90 min	Feature	
Days and Nights of Demetra K	Eva Stefani	2021	72 min	Feature	
Death	Nadia Hallgren	2021	9 min	Short	
The Delights	Eduardo Crespo	2021	65 min	Feature	
Dos Estaciones	Juan Pablo González	2022	99 min	Feature	
Eventually	Rikke Nørgaard	2021	56 min	Feature	
Expo Film (this film is my memory)	Penny McCann	2020	9 min	Short	
Factory to the Workers	Srđan Kovačević	2021	106 min	Feature	
Fire of Love	Sara Dosa	2021	93 min	Feature	
GES-2	Nastia Korkia	2021	77 min	Feature	
Gods of Mexico	Helmut Dosantos	2022	97 min	Feature	
Golden Jubilee	Suneil Sanzgiri	2021	19 min	Short	
Greetings from Myanmar	Sunniva Sundby & Andreas J. Riiser	2020	6 min	Short	
H6	Yé Yé	2021	113 min	Feature	
I Didn’t See You There	Reid Davenport	2022	77 min	Feature	
Ikebana	Rita Ferrando	2021	13 min	Short	
In Flow of Words	Eliane Esther Bots	2021	22 min	Short	
It Runs in the Family	Victoria Linares Villegas	2022	83 min	Feature	
Kalsubai	Yudhajit Basu	2021	20 min	Short	
Kicking the Clouds	Sky Hopinka	2021	16 min	Short	
Las Nubes	Juan Pablo González	2017	21 min	Short	
Last Days of August	Rodrigo Ojeda-Beck & Robert Machoian	2022	13 min	Short	
Let the Little Light Shine	Kevin Shaw	2022	86 min	Feature	
Liberation Radio	Esther Johnson	2021	14 min	Short	
Miguel's War	Eliane Raheb	2021	128 min	Feature	
Mija	Isabel Castro	2022	88 min	Feature	
Mr Landsbergis	Sergei Loznitsa	2021	146 min	Feature	
Nazarbazi	Maryam Tafakory	2022	19 min	Short	
No U-Turn	Ike Nnaebue	2022	92 min	Feature	
Nuisance Bear	Jack Weisman & Gabriela Osio Vanden	2021	14 min	Short	
Octopus	Karim Kassem	2020	64 min	Feature	
Our Ark	Deniz Tortum & Kathryn Hamilton	2021	12 min	Short	
Quitting Time	Cameron Yates	2022	8 min	Short	
The Rightful	Ana Galizia	2022	21 min	Short	
Riotsville, U.S.A.	Sierra Pettengill	2022	91 min	Feature	
Sirens	Rita Baghdadi	2022	78 min	Feature	
The Still Side	Miko Revereza & Carolina Fusilier	2021	70 min	Feature	
The Territory	Alex Pritz	2022	85 min	Feature	
Turn Your Body to the Sun	Aliona Van der Horst	2021	93 min	Feature	
Vedette	Claudine Bories & Patrice Chagnard	2021	99 min	Feature	
We Met in Virtual Reality	Joe Hunting	2021	91 min	Feature	
Where Are We Headed	Ruslan Fedotow	2021	63 min	Feature	
You Can't Stop Spirit	Vashni Korin	2021	16 min	Short	
You've Never Been Completely Honest	Joey Izzo	2021	11 min	Short	
Zigipouse	Alan Sahin	2021	10 min	Short	

=== 2023 ===
Title	Director (s)	Year	Runtime	Type	Program
Alpha Kings	Enrique Pedraza Botero & Faye Tsakas	2022	14 min	Short	
Anhell69	Theo Montoya	2022	72 min	Feature	
Anima	Manuel Mateo Gomez	2022	19 min	Short	
Aqueronte	Manuel Muñoz Rivas	2023	26 min	Short	
Aralkum	Mila Zhluktenko & Daniel Asadi Faezi	2022	14 min	Short	
Art Talent Show	Adéla Komrzý & Tomáš Bojar	2022	102 min	Feature	
Away	Ruslan Fedotow	2022	28 min	Short	
Bad Press	Rebecca Landsberry-Baker & Joe Peeler	2022	98 min	Feature	True Life Fund
Before It Breaks	Swetha Regunathan	2022	7 min	Short	
Bobi Wine: The People's President	Christopher Sharp & Moses Bwayo	2022	114 min	Feature	
Broca's Aphasia	SU Ming-Yen	2022	85 min	Feature	
Caballo De Espuma	Juanjo Rueda	2022	20 min	Short	
Dogwatch	Gregoris Rentis	2022	78 min	Feature	
Echo	Ross McClean	2023	13 min	Short	
The Empty Sphere	Stephanie Roland	2022	19 min	Short	
Example #35	Lucía Malandro	2022	6 min	Short	
The Feeling of Being Close to You	Ash Goh Hua	2022	12 min	Short	
Feet in Water, Head on Fire	Terra Long	2023	90 min	Feature	
Forms of Forgetting	Burak Çevik	2023	70 min	Feature	
Gigi La Legge	Alessandro Comodin	2022	102 min	Feature	
Going to Mars: The Nikki Giovanni Project	Michèle Stephenson & Joe Brewster	2022	102 min	Feature	
Going Varsity in Mariachi	Alejandra Vasquez & Sam Osborn	2022	104 min	Feature	
Guapo'y	Sofia Paoli Thorne	2022	72 min	Feature	
How to Have an American Baby	Leslie Tai	2023	117 min	Feature	
Hummingbirds	Silvia Del Carmen Castaños & Estefanía “Beba” Contreras	2023	78 min	Feature	
I Was Born in 1988	Yasaman Baghban	2022	9 min	Short	
It Runs in the Family	Victoria Linares Villegas	2022	84 min	Feature	True Vision Award
Jill, Uncredited	Anthony Ing	2022	18 min	Short	
Joonam	Sierra Urich	2022	103 min	Feature	
Language Unknown	Janelle VanderKelen	2022	6 min	Short	
La Bonga	Sebastián Pinzón Silva & Canela Reyes	2022	77 min	Feature	
Last Things	Deborah Stratman	2023	50 min	Feature	
Love at First Byte	Felizitas & Theresa Hoffmann	2022	6 min	Short	
Mafifa	Daniela Muñoz Barroso	2021	77 min	Feature	
Man on Earth	Amiel Courtin-Wilson	2022	97 min	Feature	
Margie Soudek's Salt and Pepper Shakers	Meredith Moore	2022	12 min	Short	
Milisuthando	Milisuthando Bongela	2023	128 min	Feature	
A Moment of Innocence	Mohsen Makhmalbaf	1996	78 min	Feature	
Moomin	Zach Dorn	2022	5 min	Short	
Moosa Lane	Anita Mathal Hopland	2022	87 min	Feature	
Moune Ô	Maxime Jean-Baptiste	2022	17 min	Short	
Natalia	Elizabeth Mirzaei	2022	76 min	Feature	
No Elements	Barbara Vojtašáková	2022	25 min	Short	
Our Body	Claire Simon	2022	168 min	Feature	
Paradise	Alexander Abaturov	2022	89 min	Feature	
R 21 aka Restoring Solidarity	Mohanad Yaqubi	2022	71 min	Feature	
Ramona	Victoria Linares Villegas	2023	83 min	Feature	
Red Herring	Kit Vincent	2023	94 min	Feature	
The Stroll	Kristen Lovell & Zackary Drucker	2023	85 min	Feature	
The Taste of Mango	Chloe Abrahams	2023	75 min	Feature	
Tavuri	Dervis Zaim	2022	93 min	Feature	
Tension Envelopes	Robert Greene	2023	9 min	Short	
That Day on the River	Lei Lei	2023	39 min	Short	
Three Women	Maksym Melnyk	2022	85 min	Feature	
Tierra de Leche	Milton Guillén & Fiona Hall	2022	12 min	Short	
Time Bomb Y2K	Brian Becker & Marley McDonald	2023	80 min	Feature	
Visão do Paraíso (Vision of Paradise)	Leonardo Pirondi	2022	16 min	Short	
While the Night Falls	Amir Aether Valen	2023	18 min	Short	
Xarassi Xanne (Crossing Voices)	Raphaël Grisey & Bouba Touré	2022	122 min	Feature	
You Are Not Here	Nastia Korkia	2022	16 min	Short	

=== 2024 ===
Title	Director (s)	Year	Runtime	Type	Program
1489	Shoghakat Vardanyan	2023	76 min	Feature	
23 Mile	Mitch McCabe	2024	78 min	Feature	
Agent of Happiness	Arun Bhattarai & Dorottya Zurbó	2024	94 min	Feature	
Alien Island	Cristóbal Valenzuela Berrios	2023	87 min	Feature	
Allo la France	Floriane Devigne	2023	78 min	Feature	
Amma ki Katha	Nehal Vyas	2023	21 min	Short	
Ardent Other	Alice Brygo	2022	16 min	Short	
As the Tide Comes In	Juan Palacios & Sofie Husum Johannesen	2023	89 min	Feature	
Background	Khaled Abdulwahed	2023	64 min	Feature	
A Band of Dreamers and a Judge	Hesam Eslami	2023	80 min	Feature	
Behind Closed Doors	João Pedro Bim	2023	66 min	Feature	
Boyz	Sylvain Cruiziat	2023	73 min	Feature	
Contractions	Lynne Sachs	2024	12 min	Short	
Dancing on the Edge of a Volcano	Cyril Aris	2023	87 min	Feature	
Daughters	Angela Patton & Natalie Rae	2023	111 min	Feature	
Dreams about Putin	Nastia Korkia	2023	30 min	Short	
Empty Rooms	Zhenia Kazankina	2023	6 min	Short	
L'Esquisse	Tomas Cali	2023	9 min	Short	
Familia 💖💎	Picho García & Gabriela Pena	2024	19 min	Short	
Flying Lessons	Elizabeth Nichols	2024	84 min	Feature	
Four Holes	Daniela Muñoz Barroso	2023	20 min	Short	
Friends on the Outside	Annabel Moodie	2023	10 min	Short	
Girls State	Amanda McBaine & Jesse Moss	2023	96 min	Feature	
Gwetto	Michaël Andrianaly	2023	52 min	Feature	True Vision Award
Headshot	Dominic Yarabe	2023	8 min	Short	
I Am the Immaculate Conception	Frank Eli Martin	2023	17 min	Short	
I Like It Here	Ralph Arlyck	2022	88 min	Feature	
I Would've Been Happy	Jordan Wong	2023	9 min	Short	
Ibelin	Benjamin Ree	2024	104 min	Feature	
Junior Tu Papá	Daniel Díaz	2024	16 min	Short	
K-Family Affairs	Arum Nam	2023	86 min	Feature	
The Lady with Lipstick	Francesca Coppola	2023	9 min	Short	
Look Into My Eyes	Lana Wilson	2023	107 min	Feature	
Magic Mountain	Mariam Chachia & Nik Voigt	2023	74 min	Feature	
The Medallion	Ruth Hunduma	2023	19 min	Short	
Night Audit	Ryan Ross	2023	15 min	Short	
Nofinofy	Michaël Andrianaly	2019	73 min	Feature	
Nortel	Evan Gareth Hoffman	2023	15 min	Short	
Obsolete	Sumira Roy	2023	64 min	Feature	
On the Battlefield	Theresa Delsoin, Lisa Marie Malloy, J.P. Sniadecki, Ray Whitaker	2024	13 min	Short	
The Other Profile	Armel Hostiou	2023	82 min	Feature	
Personal Mythologies	Susan O'Brien	2024	5 min	Short	
A Photographic Memory	Rachel Elizabeth Seed	2024	87 min	Feature	
POV Memory	Igor Smola	2023	13 min	Short	
Queen's Crochet	Hanna Cho	2023	36 min	Short	
Roberto Baggio	Henrique Cartaxo	2023	7 min	Short	
Seeking Mavis Beacon	Jazmin Jones	2024	102 min	Feature	
Spermworld	Lance Oppenheim	2024	84 min	Feature	
sr	Lea Hartlaub	2024	103 min	Feature	
Strong Grandma	Cecilia Brown & Winslow Crane-Murdoch	2023	15 min	Short	
There Was, There Was Not	Emily Mkrtichian	2024	90 min	Feature	
This Is Going to Be Big	Thomas Charles Hyland	2023	100 min	Feature	
Three Promises	Yousef Srouji	2023	61 min	Feature	True Life Fund
Tilted Arc	Baxter Stein	2023	14 min	Short	
Todisoa and the Black Stones	Ruth Hunduma	2013	26 min	Short	
Tokyo Story	Yasujirō Ozu	1953	136 min	Feature	
Two Sun	Blair Barnes	2023	5 min	Short	
Union	Stephen Maing & Brett Story	2024	104 min	Feature	
Yintah	Jennifer Wickham, Brenda Michell & Michael Toledano	2024	125 min	Feature	

=== 2025 ===
Title	Director (s)	Year	Runtime	Type	Program
A Body to Live In	Angelo Madsen	2025	98 min	Feature	
A Want In Her	Myrid Carten	2024	81 min	Feature	
Abo Zaabal 89	Bassam Mortada	2024	83 min	Feature	
Animal Eye	Carlo Nasisse	2024	13 min	Short	
Another Rapid Event	Daniel Murphy	2024	8 min	Short	
Biir	Bentley Brown & Tahir Ben Mahamat	2025	6 min	Short	
Blue	Derek Jarman	1993	76 min	Feature	True Vision Award Program
Chimera	Martin Andre & Gael Jara	2024	11 min	Short	
Correct Me If I’m Wrong	Hao Zhou	2025	23 min	Short	
Daily Worker	Ting Su	2024	10 min	Short	
David (for now)	Humberto Flores Jáuregui	2024	15 min	Short	
Deaf President Now!	Nyle DiMarco & Davis Guggenheim	2024	100 min	Feature	
Entre le Feu et le Clair de Lune	Dominic Yarabe	2024	18 min	Short	
Expression of Illness	Bryn Silverman	2024	21 min	Short	
Family Album	Laura Casabé	2024	73 min	Feature	
Hold Me Close	Aurora Brachman & LaTajh Simmons-Weaver	2025	19 min	Short	
Hope Chest	Lily Franck	2024	4 min	Short	
How Deep is Your Love	Eleanor Mortimer	2025	100 min	Feature	
How the West Was Fun	Sarah Garrahan & Sue Ding	2025	14 min	Short	
How to Build A Library	Maia Lekow and Christopher King	2025	103 min	Feature	
John Lilly and the Earth Coincidence Control Office	Michael Almereyda & Courtney Stephens	2025	89 min	Feature	
Kouté vwa (Listen to the Voices)	Maxime Jean-Baptiste	2024	77 min	Feature	
Land With No Rider	Tamar Lando	2025	76 min	Feature	
Lanawaru	Angello Faccini Rueda	2024	15 min	Short	
Light Memories	Misha Vallejo Prut	2024	80 min	Feature	
Make It Look Real	Danial Shah	2024	68 min	Feature	
May the Soil Be Everywhere	Yehui Zhao	2024	96 min	Feature	
Middletown	Jesse Moss & Amanda McBaine	2025	111 min	Feature	
Mountain Village	Hu Sanshou	2013	70 min	Feature	True Vision Award Program
No se ve desde acá (You Can’t See It From Here)	Enrique Pedráza-Botero	2024	19 min	Short	
Piñata Prayers	Daniel Larios	2025	24 min	Short	
Predators	David Osit	2025	96 min	Feature	
Psychedelic in the Sky	Matthew Salton	2024	11 min	Short	
Razeh-del	Maryam Tafakory	2024	28 min	Short	
Requiem for a Tribe	Marjan Khosravi	2024	70 min	Feature	
Resurrection	Hu Sanshou	2024	113 min	Feature	True Vision Award Program
River of Grass	Sasha Wortzel	2025	83 min	Feature	
Sally	Cristina Costantini	2025	103 min	Feature	
Seeds	Brittany Shyne	2025	122 min	Feature	
Sunset and the Mockingbird	Jyllian Gunther	2025	29 min	Short	
Te Amo Tanto Pero Eres Tan Difícil (I Love You So Much But You Are So Difficult)	Berenicé Brino	2024	14 min	Short	
Tessitura	Lydia Cornett and Brit Fryer	2024	18 min	Short	
The Dating Game	Violet Du Feng	2025	90 min	Feature	
The Flowers Stand Silently, Witnessing	Theo Panagopoulos	2024	17 min	Short	
The Silence of My Hands	Manuel Acuña A	2024	80 min	Feature	
The Track	Ryan Sidhoo	2025	91 min	Feature	True Life Fund
The Undergrowth	Macu Machín	2024	72 min	Feature	
The Wolves Always Come at Night	Gabrielle Brady	2024	96 min	Feature	
Trapstarz	Gonçalo Loureiro	2024	23 min	Short	
Valentina and the MUOSters	Francesca Scalisi	2024	80 min	Feature	
Wishing on a Star	Peter Kerekes	2024	99 min	Feature	
Writing Hawa	Najiba Noori and Rasul Noori	2024	85 min	Feature	
WTO/99	Ian Bell	2025	100 min	Feature	
Your Harvest May Be Delayed	Ahmad Al-Zu'bi	2024	15 min	Short	
Zodiac Killer Project	Charlie Shackleton	2025	92 min	Feature	

=== 2026 ===
Title	Director (s)	Year	Runtime	Type	Program
Aanikoobijigan [ancestor/great-grandparent/great-grandchild]	Adam Khalil & Zachary Khalil	2026	85 min	Feature	
Always	Deming Chen	2025	87 min	Feature	
American Doctor	Poh Si Teng	2026	90 min	Feature	
Ancestral Knowledge	Ruby Chasi	2025	18 min	Short	
Auto Queens	Sraiyanti Haricharan	2025	31 min	Short	
Barbara Forever	Brydie O’Connor	2026	102 min	Feature	
Bend in the River	Robb Moss	2025	82 min	Feature	
Born Secret	Riley Fitchpatrick	2025	19 min	Short	
Boys and the Bees	Arielle Knight	2025	19 min	Short	
Broken English	Iain Forsyth & Jane Pollard	2026	96 min	Feature	
Bucks Harbor	Pete Muller	2026	98 min	Feature	
Buckskin	Mars Verrone	2025	17 min	Short	
Care (Cuidadoras)	Martina Matzkin & Gabriela Uassouf	2025	80 min	Feature	
Closure	Michał Marczak	2026	108 min	Feature	
Diaries	Ed Pincus	1976	210 min	Feature	True Vision Award Repertory
Division	Paul Dallas	2025	14 min	Short	
Endlings	María Luisa Santos	2025	16 min	Short	
Eyes of Ghana	Ben Proudfoot	2025	90 min	Feature	
Escalation	AJ Schnack	2026	36 min	Short	
First They Came for My College	Patrick Xavier	2026	105 min	Feature	
Fred's Basement Bijou	Michael T. Vollmann	2025	13 min	Short	
Gatorville	Freddie Gluck	2025	19 min	Short	
The Great Experiment	Steve Maing & Eric Daniel Metzgar	2025	100 min	Feature	
Hair, Paper, Water...	Trương Minh Quý & Nicolas Graux	2025	71 min	Feature	
High Rise Pigs	Ang Siew Ching	2025	15 min	Short	
Hotline	Ricki Stern & Jesse Sweet	2026	36 min	Short	
How to Clean a House in 10 Easy Steps	Carolina Gonzalez	2026	80 min	Feature	
Impossible Address	Suneil Sanzgiri	2026	38 min	Short	
In Exchange For Flesh	Corey Devon Arthur & Sandro Ramani	2025	15 min	Short	
Jaripeo	Efraín Mojica & Rebecca Zweig	2026	67 min	Feature	
Jism (Body)	Husain Qaizar	2025	13 min	Short	
L'mina	Randa Maroufi	2025	26 min	Short	
Land of Cold	Hervé Demers	2025	26 min	Short	
Landscapes of Memory	Leah Galant	2026	77 min	Feature	
Mary Oliver: Saved by the Beauty of the World	Sasha Waters	2026	91 min	Feature	
No Mean City	Ross McClean	2025	15 min	Short	
Nuisance Bear	Gabriela Osio Vanden & Jack Weisman	2026	90 min	Feature	
The Oldest Person in the World	Sam Green	2026	87 min	Feature	
One Last Order	Lauren DeFilippo and Sam Soko	2025	21 min	Short	
Páa'tenehu (Wait For Me)	Thiago Zanato	2025	11 min	Short	
Pass Time	Jj Measer	2025	16 min	Short	
Phenomena	Josef Gatti	2025	86 min	Feature	
Pinball	Naveen Chaubal	2026	86 min	Feature	
A Place of Absence	Marialuisa Ernst	2025	86 min	Feature	
Powwow People	Sky Hopinka	2025	88 min	Feature	
The Queen and the Smokehouse	Iga Lis	2025	65 min	Feature	
Remake	Ross McElwee	2025	116 min	Feature	True Vision Award
Same Water	Martine Granby	2025	21 min	Short	
School For Defectors	Jeremy Workman	2026	97 min	Feature	
Seized	Sharon Liese	2026	92 min	Feature	
Sherman's March	Ross McElwee	1987	157 min	Feature	True Vision Award Repertory
Sole (얼)	Haneol Lee	2025	12 min	Short	
Sons of Detroit	Jeremy Xido	2025	104 min	Feature	
Soul Patrol	J.M. Harper	2026	99 min	Feature	
Sudakas	Ricardo Betancourt	2025	13 min	Short	
TCB – The Toni Cade Bambara School of Organizing	Monica Henriquez & Louis Massiah	2025	105 min	Feature	
Time and Water	Sara Dosa	2026	90 min	Feature	
To Hold a Mountain	Biljana Tutorov & Petar Glomazić	2026	105 min	Feature	
Tropical Park	Hansel Porras Garcia	2025	85 min	Feature	
True North	Michèle Stephenson	2025	96 min	Feature	
What Comes From Sitting In Silence?	Sophie Schrago	2026	76 min	Feature	
Who Moves America	Yael Bridge	2026	87 min	Feature	
You Do Not Exist	Dwayne LeBlanc	2026	8 min	Short	

True/False includes films by local and international filmmakers, with thousands of films being sent in each year for consideration.

== True Vision Award ==
The True/False Film Fest offers a single award. The True Vision Award is given annually to the filmmaker, or filmmakers, whose work shows a dedication to the creative advancement of the art of nonfiction filmmaking. Each winner is presented with an original bronze sculpture, created by nationally known Columbia artist Larry Young.

Year	Recipient(s)	Film*
2004	Joe Berlinger and Bruce Sinofsky	Metallica: Some Kind of Monster
2005	Stephen Marshall	This Revolution
2006	Kirby Dick	Chain Camera
2007	Brett Morgen	Nimrod Nation
2008	Alex Gibney	Gonzo and Taxi to the Dark Side
2009	Kim Longinotto	Rough Aunties
2010	Laura Poitras	The Oath
2011	James Marsh	Project Nim
2012	Viktor Kossakovsky	¡Vivan las Antipodas!
2013	Lucien Castaing-Taylor and Véréna Paravel	Leviathan
2014	Amir Bar-Lev	Happy Valley
2015	Adam Curtis	Bitter Lake
2016	Mehrdad Oskouei	Starless Dreams
2017	Claire Simon	The Graduation
2018	Dieudo Hamadi	Kinshasa Makambo
2019	Nuria Ibáñez Castañeda	A Wild Stream
2020	Bill & Turner Ross	Bloody Nose, Empty Pockets
2021	Rosine Mbakam	Chez Jolie Coiffure
2022	Juan Pablo González	Dos Estaciones
2023	Victoria Linares Villegas	It Runs in the Family
2024	Michaël Andrianaly	Gwetto, Nofinofy
2025	Hu Sanshou	Resurrection, Mountain Village
2026	Ross McElwee	Remake

*The newest film presented by the chosen winner in each year's festival.

== True Life Fund ==
Since 2007, the True/False Film Fest has also featured the True Life Fund, a fundraising program which goes to demonstrate that documentaries can create change by offering tangible assistance to the real-life subjects of a new non-fiction film each year. The fund further acknowledges that documentary filmmakers and festivals thrive because of the stories provided by people of often limited means. The True Life Fund was presented by The Crossing (a Missouri church group) from 2009-2020 and also received support from the Bertha Foundation.

Year	Film	Director(s)	Funds Raised	Supported Cause
2007	We Are Together	Paul Taylor	$8,500	Purchase school supplies for the Children of Agape singing choir of South Africa.
2008	Very Young Girls	David Schisgall	$9,000	Provide services to girls recovering from the trauma of sexual exploitation, through GEMS (Girls Educational & Mentoring Service).
2009	Burma VJ	Anders Østergaard	$9,000	Purchase equipment for underground journalists in Burma.
2010	Enemies of the People	Thet Sambath and Rob Lemkin	$10,000	Help efforts to interview former members of the Khmer Rouge in Cambodia.
2011	The Interrupters	Steve James	$15,000	Help Ameena Matthews, Cobe Williams and Eddie Bocanegra of the anti-violence group CeaseFire.
2012	Bully	Lee Hirsch	$30,000	Help the five families featured in the film, which were victimized by bullying.
2013	Restrepo	Sebastian Junger and Tim Hetherington	$36,760	Support RISC (Reporters Instructed in Saving Colleagues) and The Milton Margai School for the Blind.
2014	Private Violence	Cynthia Hill	$23,000	Support the work of Deanna Walters, Kit Gruelle, Stacy Cox and Naomi Jean Kilpatrick.
2015	The Look of Silence	Joshua Oppenheimer	$35,000	Support Adi Rukun's efforts to open an optometry shop in Indonesia.
2016	Sonita	Rokhsareh Ghaemmaghami	$43,000	Provide assistance for Sonita, an Afghani musician and undocumented Iranian immigrant.
2017	Quest	Jonathan Olshefski	$34,750	Support Christopher and Christine'a Rainey's in-home studio for North Philadelphia neighborhood recording artists.
2018	Primas	Laura Bari	$25,000	Support Rocío and Aldana's future artistic and collegiate endeavors.
2019	Midnight Traveler	Hassan Fazili	[To Be Announced]	Help alleviate legal expenses, and support them in setting up their new home
2020	Welcome to Chechnya	David France	[To Be Announced]	
2021	Sabaya	Hogir Hirori	[To Be Announced]	
2022	The Territory	Alex Pritz	[To Be Announced]	
2023	Bad Press	Rebecca Landsberry-Baker and Joe Peeler	[To Be Announced]	
2024	Three Promises	Yousef Srouji	[To Be Announced]	
2025	The Track	Ryan Sidhoo	$34,000	
2026	How to Clean a House in 10 Easy Steps	Carolina Gonzalez Valencia	[To Be Announced]	Support the caregivers highlighted in the film and their families.
