= Tacoma Film Festival =

Annual film festival in Washington, US

Tacoma Film Festival (TFF)
- Location: Tacoma, Washington, United States
- Founded: 2006
- Language: English
- Website: tacomafilmfestival.com

The Tacoma Film Festival (TFF) is a film festival held annually in Tacoma, Washington, United States. It usually takes place in October.

It is one of the largest festivals in Washington, and features programming of independent American and foreign films, and a strong contingent of documentaries, with an emphasis on films produced in the Pacific Northwest.

== History ==
Founded in 2006, the Tacoma Film Festival (TFF) has been hosted annually at the Grand Cinema. Created with the intention to foster the film community in Tacoma and the broader Pacific Northwest region, the festival has grown from a small regional event to a prominent fixture in the region's cultural landscape. TFF provides a platform for regional and international filmmakers and has been described as the "Sundance of the Pacific Northwest," emphasizing its growing reputation and influence in the region's film community.

== Awards ==
=== 2007 ===
2007 Tacoma Film Festival Awards
Category	Film title	Director(s)
Best Narrative Feature	Rain in the Mountains	Joel Metlen; Christine Sullivan
Best Documentary Feature	Spitfire 944	William Lorton
Best Narrative Short	Full Disclosure	Douglas Horn
Best Local Film	GPS - The Movie	Eric Colley
Audience Choice	My Left Hand	Joshua Isaac

=== 2009 ===
2009 Tacoma Film Festival Awards
Category	Film title	Director(s)
Best Narrative Feature	White on Rice	Dave Boyle
Best Documentary Feature	Freeing Silvia Baraldini	Margo Pelletier; Lisa Thomas
Best Narrative Short	Sebastian's Voodoo	Joaquin Baldwin
Best Regional Film	Otis v Monster	Patrick Neary
Audience Choice	The Stairwell	Andrew Finnigan

=== 2010 ===
2010 Tacoma Film Festival Awards
Category	Film title	Director(s)
Best Narrative Feature	Earthwork	Chris Ordel
Best Documentary Feature	Back to the Garden	Kevin Tomlinson
Best Narrative Short	Ana's Playground	Eric D. Howell
Best Regional Film	Shuffle	Garrett Bennett
Best Animated Film	A Complex Villainelle	Nathan Billington, Howard Cook, Rebecca Forth, Bart Ovaitt, & Ryan Porter
Audience Choice	Wheedle's Groove	Jennifer Maas

=== 2011 ===
2011 Tacoma Film Festival Awards
Category	Film title	Director(s)
Best Narrative Feature	This Narrow Place	Sooney Kadouh
Best Documentary Feature	The Two Escobars	Jeff Zimbalist; Michael Zimbalist
Best Regional Film	Connect To	Sam Nuttmann
Best Animated Film	The Fantastic Flying Books of Mr. Morris Lessmore	William Joyce & Brandon Oldenburg
Best Narrative Short	Thief	Julian Higgins
Audience Choice	Fort McCoy	Kate Connor & Michael Worth
Local Audience Choice	Half Empty (Fantastic Confabulations)	Andrew Finnigan

=== 2012 ===
2012 Tacoma Film Festival Awards
Category	Film title	Director(s)
Best Narrative Feature	Dead Man's Burden	Jared Moshe
Best Documentary Feature	Lemon	Laura Brownson; Beth Levison
Best Animated Film	Thumb Snatchers from the Moon Cocoon	Brad Schaffer
Audience Choice	The Magic Life	Nelson Cheng
Local Audience Choice	Shadowed	Joey Johnson
Best Narrative Short	Curfew	Shawn Christensen
Best Documentary Short	Odysseus' Gambit	Alex Lora

=== 2013 ===
2013 Tacoma Film Festival Awards
Category	Film title	Director(s)
Best Narrative Feature	Euphonia	Danny Madden
Best Documentary Feature	A River Changes Course	Kalyanee Mam
Best Regional Film	Improvement Club	Dayna Hanson
Best Animated Film	Woody	Stuart Bowen
Audience Choice	Her Aim is True	Karen Whitehead
Best Narrative Short	The Telegram Man	James Francis Khehtie

=== 2014 ===
2014 Tacoma Film Festival Awards
Category	Film title	Director(s)
Best Narrative Feature	Kumiko, the Treasure Hunter	David Zellner
Best Documentary Feature	The Immortalists	David Alvarado; Jason Sussberg
Best Regional Film	Koinonia	Andrew Finnigan
Best Animated Film	Yearbook	Bernardo Britto
Audience Choice	Life Partners	Susanna Fogel
Local Audience Choice	Laggies	Lynn Shelton
Best Narrative Short	What Cheer?	Michael Slavens
Best Documentary Short	David Hockney in the NOW	Lucy Walker

=== 2015 ===
2015 Tacoma Film Festival Awards
Category	Film title	Director(s)
Best Regional Film	Even the Walls	Sarah Kuck & Saman Maydani
Best Narrative Short	The Chicken	Una Gunjack
Best Documentary Short	Live Fast Draw Yung	Stacey Lee & Anthony Mathile
Best Director	The Chicken	Una Gunjack
Best Cinematography	Mathias Pilz for The Chicken	Una Gunjack
Best Screenplay	Eric Fallen & Moon Molson for The Bravest, the Boldest	Moon Molson
Best Actress	Sameerah Luqmaan-Harris for The Bravest, the Boldest	Moon Molson
Best Actor	Joseph Smith for Hagereseb	Zia Mohajerjasbi
Audience Choice Feature	Landfill Harmonic	Brad Allgood; Graham Townsley
Audience Choice Short	Birthday	Chris King
Local Audience Choice Feature	The Glamour & the Squalor	Marq Evans
Local Audience Choice Short	Big Boy	Bryan Campbell

=== 2016 ===
2016 Tacoma Film Festival Awards
Category	Film title	Director(s)
Best Narrative Short	Home	Daniel Mulloy
Best Actor (Narrative)	Abraham Attah in Out of the Village	Jonathan Stein
Best Actress (Narrative)	Charlie Chan Dagelet in Hold One	Charlotte Scott-Wilson
Best Screenplay (Narrative)	Christophe M. Saber for Discipline	Christophe M. Saber
Best Cinematography (Narrative)	Paul MacKay; Victor Seguin for Home	Daniel Mulloy
Best Director (Narrative)	And Nothing Happened	Naima Ramos-Chapman
Best Documentary Short	The Carousel	Jonathan Napolitano
Best Cinematography (Documentary)	Nathan Golon for I Am Yup'ik	
Best Director (Documentary)	The Tricks List	Brian Bolster
Local Audience Choice Short	Phil's Camino	Annie O'Neil
Local Audience Choice Feature	As You Are	Miles Joris-Peyrafitte
Audience Choice Short	Out of the Village	Jonathan Stein
Audience Choice Feature	Score: A Film Music Documentary	Matt Schrader

=== 2017 ===
2017 Tacoma Film Festival Awards
Category	Film title	Director(s)
Best Narrative Feature	Izzy Gets the F*ck Across Town	Christian Papierniak
Best Director (Narrative)	Everything Beautiful is Far Away	Pete Ohs; Andrea Sisson
Best Cinematography (Narrative)	Christian Sorensen Hansen and Pete Ohs for Everything Beautiful is Far Away	Pete Ohs
Best Performance (Narrative)	Jun Zhao in King of Peking	Sam Voutas
Best Performance (Narrative)	Mackenzie Davis in Izzy Gets the F*ck Across Town	Christian Papierniak
Best Screenplay (Narrative)	Sam Voutas for King of Peking	Sam Voutas
Best Narrative Short	Import	Ena Sendijarevic
Best Cinematography in a Narrative Short	Christian Houge Laursen in Forever Now	
Best Performance in a Narrative Short	Max Jenkins for The Mess He Made	
Best Performance in a Narrative Short	Nicole Williams in Game	Kristian Håskjold and Trille Cecilie Uldall-Spanner
Best Screenplay in a Narrative Short	Forever Now	
Best Director in a Narrative Short	Ena Sendijarevic for Import	Ena Sendijarevic
Best Regional Film	Little Potato	
Audience Choice Best Local Short	Richard Twice	
Audience Choice Best Local Feature	Semi-Iconic: The Ballad of Dick Rossetti	
Audience Choice Short	Game	
Audience Choice Feature	A Shot in the Dark	
Best Documentary Feature	For Ahkeem	
Best Director of Documentary Feature	Mike Day for The Islands and the Whales	
Best Cinematography in a Documentary Feature	Mike Day for The Islands and the Whales	
Best Documentary Short	Wildland	
Best Director of Documentary Short	Lauren Frohne for The Legacy of Linc's Tackle	Lauren Frohne
Best Cinematography in a Documentary Short	John Pope for The Wizard Oz	

=== 2018 ===
2018 Tacoma Film Festival Awards
Category	Film title	Director(s)
Best Narrative Feature	Drift	Helena Wittman
Best Director - Narrative Feature	Adam Khalil and Bayley Sweitzer for Empty Metal	Adam Khalil; Bayley Sweitzer
Best Cinematography - Narrative Feature	Ashley Connor for Mountain Rest	Ashley Connor
Best Screenplay - Narrative Feature	Bryce Richardson for I Want More, I Want Less	Bryce Richardson
Best Performance - Narrative Feature	Sophia Mitri Schloss for I Want More, I Want Less	Bryce Richardson
Best Narrative Short	Nettles	Raven Jackson
Best Director - Narrative Short	Faren Humes Macho	Faren Humes
Best Cinematography - Narrative Short	Shawn Peters for Piu Piu	Naima Ramos-Chapman
Best Performance - Narrative Short	Dymond Veve in Kira Burning	Laurel Parmet
Best Screenplay - Narrative Short	Mariama Diallo for Hair Wolf	Mariama Diallo
Best Documentary Feature	Distant Constellation	Shevaun Mizrahi
Best Director - Documentary Feature	Daniel Patrick Carbone for Phantom Cowboys	Daniel Patrick Carbone
Best Cinematography - Documentary Feature	Erick Stoll for America	Chase Whiteside; Erick Stoll
Best Documentary Short	Silica	Pia Borg
Best Director - Documentary Short	Adam Khalil, Zack Khalil, and Jackson Polys for The Violence of Civilization Without Secrets	Adam Khalil; Zack Khalil; Jackson Polys
Best Cinematography - Documentary Short	Luis Gutierrez Arias and John Henry Theisen for It's Going to Be Beautiful	Luis Gutierrez Arias; John Henry Theisen
Best Pacific Northwest Film	Civil	Stephen Takashima
Best Pierce County Film	Medieval Martha Stewart	Taylor Hawkins
Audience Choice - Best Short	The Burden	Niki Lindroth von Bahr
Audience Choice - Best Feature	Dawnland	Adam Mazo; Ben Pender-Cudlip
Audience Choice - Best Regional Short	Medieval Martha Stewart	Taylor Hawkins
Audience Choice - Best Regional Feature	Boom! A film about The Sonics	Jordan Albertsen
Best Virtual Reality Film 1	Swampscapes	Liz Miller; Juan Carlos Zaldavar; Kim Grinfeder
Best Virtual Reality Film 2	Biidaaban: First Light	Lisa Jackson

=== 2019 ===
2019 Tacoma Film Festival Awards
Category	Film title	Director(s)
Best Narrative Feature	Mad Dog Labine	Jonathan Beaulieu-Cyr; Renaud Lessard
Best Director - Narrative Feature	Adam Khalil and Bayley Sweitzer for Empty Metal	
Best Cinematography - Narrative Feature	Christopher Rejano for Knives and Skin	
Best Screenplay - Narrative Feature	The Plagiarists	James N. Kienitz Wilkins; Robin Schavoir
Best Performance - Narrative Feature	Zoé Audet for Mad Dog Labine	Jonathan Beaulieu-Cyr; Renaud Lessard
Best Narrative Short	Dios Nunca Muere	Barbara Cigarroa
Best Director - Narrative Short	Barbara Cigarroa for Dios Nunca Muere	Barbara Cigarroa
Best Cinematography - Narrative Short	for All These Creatures	Adric Watson
Best Performance - Narrative Short	Tamar Amit-Joseph in Halayla	
Best Screenplay - Narrative Short	for Halayla	Emily Shir Segal
Best Narrative Short Honorable Mention 1	New Land Broken Road	Kavich Neang
Best Narrative Short Honorable Mention 2	Dumpling	Xiaolu Wang
Best Documentary Feature	Caballerango	Juan Pablo González
Best Director - Documentary Feature	Kavich Neang for Last Night I Saw You Smiling	Kavich Neang
Best Cinematography - Documentary Feature	Juan Pablo González for Caballerango	Juan Pablo González
Best Documentary Short	La Flaca	Adriana Barbosa; Thiago Zanato
Best Director - Documentary Short	Darius Clark Monroe for Black 14	Darius Clark Monroe
Best Cinematography - Documentary Short	Juanita Onzaga for Our Song to War	
Documentary Short Honorable Mention 1	La Flaca	Adriana Barbosa; Thiago Zanato
Documentary Short Honorable Mention 2	Prisoner of Society	Rati Tsiteladze
Best Pacific Northwest Narrative Feature	Where the House Was	Ryan Adams
Best Pacific Northwest Narrative Short	RESPEK	Kamari Bright
Best Pierce County Film	#StopErasingBlackPeople	Tacoma Action Collective
Pacific Northwest Narrative Short Honorable Mention 1	Cold Holy Water	Rankin Renwick
Pacific Northwest Narrative Short Honorable Mention 2	All on a Mardi Gras Day	Michal Pietrzyk
Audience Choice - Best Short	Kamali	Sasha Rainbow
Audience Choice - Best Feature	The Infiltrators	Cristina Ibarra; Alex Rivera
Audience Choice - Best Pacific Northwest Short	Sepulcher	Stephen Takashima
Audience Choice - Best Pacific Northwest Feature 1	Stories of Us: Camp Second Chance	Melinda Raebyne
Audience Choice - Best Pacific Northwest Feature 2	My Mother Was Here	Rustin Thompson
Best Music Video	Shambles	Jonathan Salmon
Best Animated Film	KIDS	Michael Frei

=== 2021 ===
2021 Tacoma Film Festival Awards
Category	Film title	Director(s)
Best Narrative Feature	Potato Dreams of America	Wes Hurley
Best Director - Narrative Feature	Charles Mudede for Thin Skin	Charles Mudede
Best Cinematography - Narrative Feature	Alex Grigoras for Wood and Water	Jonas Bak
Best Screenplay - Narrative Feature	Brielle Brilliant for Firstness	Brielle Brilliant
Best Performance - Narrative Feature	for Alia's Birth	Nikohl Boosheri
Best Narrative Short	The Unseen River	Pham Ngoc Lan
Best Director - Narrative Short	Affonso Uchoa for Seven Years in May	Affonso Uchoa
Best Cinematography - Narrative Short	Giorgos Valsamis for I Am Afraid to Forget Your Face	Sameh Alaa
Best Performance - Narrative Short	Nadir Saribacak in Leylak	Dennis Latos; Scott Aharoni
Best Screenplay - Narrative Short	Pham Ngoc Lan for The Unseen River	Pham Ngoc Lan
Best Documentary Feature	Acts of Love	Isidore Bethel; Francis Leplay
Best Director - Documentary Feature	Jessica Kingdon for Ascension	Jessica Kingdon
Best Cinematography - Documentary Feature	Goga Devdariani; Salome Jashi for Taming the Garden	Salomé Jashi
Best Documentary Short	Surviving You, Always	Morgan Quaintance
Best Director - Documentary Short	Adam Khalil and Adam Piron for Halpate	Adam Khalil; Adam Piron
Best Cinematography - Documentary Short	Sean Hanley for The Whelming Sea	Sean Hanley
Documentary Short Honorable Mention 1	Orbita	Udval Altangerel
Documentary Short Honorable Mention 2	Luces Del Desierto	Felix Blume
Best Pacific Northwest Feature	A Black Rift Begins to Yawn	Matthew Wade
Best Pacific Northwest Short Film	See Me	Dawn Jones Redstone
Audience Choice - Best Short	Undercut	Kelly Pike
Audience Choice - Best Feature 1	Thin Skin	Charles Mudede
Audience Choice - Best Feature 2	Missing in Brooks County	Lisa Molomet; Jeff Bemiss
Audience Choice - Best Pacific Northwest Short 1	Now Is the Time	Christopher Auchter
Audience Choice - Best Pacific Northwest Short 2	A Dinner Party from Hell	Derek Schneider
Audience Choice - Best Pacific Feature	700 Feet Down	Carly Vester; Peter Bortel
Best Animation	Our Bed is Green	Maggie Brennan
Best Music Video	Kreis	Kilian Immervoll & Anna Sophia Rußmann
Best Late Night Film	The Following Year	Miguel Campana

=== 2022 ===
2022 Tacoma Film Festival Awards
Category	Film title	Director(s)
Best Narrative Feature	Utama	Alejandro Loayza Grisi
Best Cinematography - Narrative Feature	Silvan Hillman for Unrest (Unrueh)	Cyril Schäublin
Best Screenplay - Narrative Feature	Zia Mohajerjasbi for Know Your Place	Zia Mohajerjasbi
Best Performance - Narrative Feature	Matthew Jeffers for Unidentified Objects	Juan Felipe Zuleta
Best Narrative Short	asi en la tierra como en el cielo	Mireya Martinez
Best Screenplay - Narrative Short	Brian Imakura for Some Vile Beast	Brian Imakura
Best Cinematography - Narrative Short	Ray Huang for little trumpet	Megan Trufant Tillman
Best Performance - Narrative Short	Gil Fishman in Glow Stick	
Best Screenplay - Narrative Short	Brian Imakura for Some Vile Beast	
Best Documentary Feature	After Sherman	Jon-Sesrie Goff
Best Sound Design - Documentary Feature	Gods of Mexico	Helmut Dosantos
Best Cinematography - Documentary Feature	Melisa Cardona for Powerlands	
Documentary Feature Honorable Mention 1	What We Leave Behind	Iliana Sosa
Documentary Feature Honorable Mention 2	Freedom from Everything	Mike Hoolboom
Best Documentary Short	Kicking the Clouds	Sky Hopinka
Best Sound Design - Documentary Short	Home When You Return	Carl Elsaesser
Best Cinematography - Documentary Short	Yanbin Zhao for Remaining Silent	
Documentary Short Honorable Mention 1	Blue Room	Merete Mueller
Documentary Short Honorable Mention 2	Strangers	Rajee Samarasinghe
Best Pacific Northwest Narrative Feature	The Diaper Cake	Anastasia Babenko
Best Late Night Pacific Northwest Film	Sojourn	Nesib Shamah
Best Pacific Northwest Documentary Feature	Up on the Mountain	Olivier Matthon; Michael Reis
Audience Choice - Best Short	Dana	Lucia Forner Segarra
Audience Choice - Best Feature	Butterfly in the Sky	Bradford Thomas; Brett Whitcomb
Audience Choice - Best Pacific Northwest Documentary	Buffalo Soldiers: Fighting on Two Fronts	Dru Holley
Audience Choice - Best Pacific Northwest Feature	Know Your Place	Zia Mohajerjasbi
Best Animation	No Leaders Please	Joan C. Gratz
Best Music Video	June	Magdalena Zielinska
Jurors' Award - Best Experimental Film	El Gran Movimiento	Kiro Russo
Best Late Night Film	The Timekeepers of Eternity	Aristotelis Maragkos

=== 2023 ===
2023 Tacoma Film Festival Awards
Category	Film title	Director(s)
Best Narrative Feature	Fancy Dance	Erica Tremblay
Best Documentary Feature	Brief Tender Light	Arthur Musah
Best PNW Film	Fantasy A Gets a Mattress	Noah Zoltan Sofian; David Norman Lewis
Best PNW Documentary Short	They Scream Freedom (Ellos Gritan Libertad)	Melinda Raebyne
Best Narrative Short	Black Seed	Amirhoman Khosravani
Best Documentary Short	Buurman Abdi	Douwe Dijkstra
Best PNW Narrative Short	In This Neighborhood	Lilly Lion
Best PNW Documentary Short	Savi the Cat	Netsanet Tjirongo; Bryan Tucker
Best Animated Short Film	The Old Young Crow	Liam Lopinto
Best Late Night Short Film	Unknown Heavens	Erik M.G. Fox
Best Experimental Short Film	Lotus-Eyed Girl	Rajee Samarasinghe
Audience Choice Award, PNW Film	Punderneath It All	Abby Hagan
Audience Choice Award, Feature Film	Immediate Family	Denny Tedesco
Audience Choice Award, Short Film	Confessions	Stephanie Kaznocha
