= Thanh Hóa Bridge =

Bridge in Vietnam

Thanh Hóa bridge
- Part of the Vietnam War
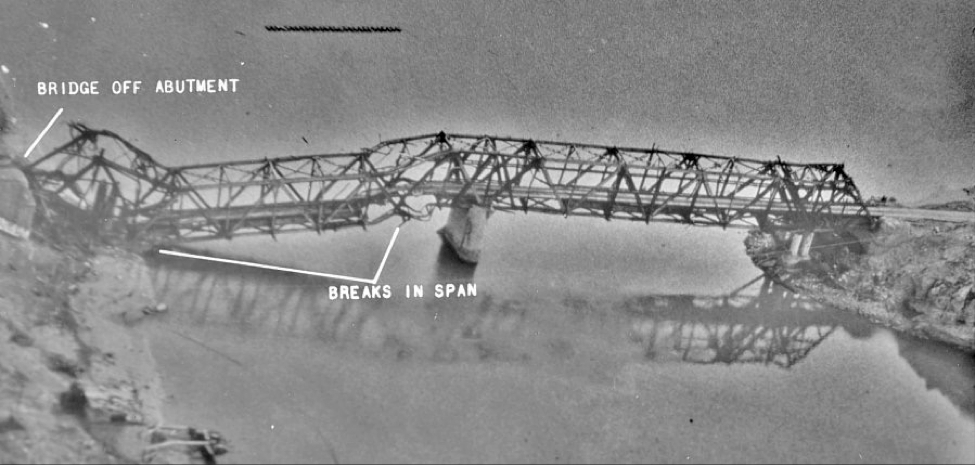
- Thanh Hóa Bridge after it was hit by laser-guided bombs
Date	April 4, 1965 – May 13, 1972
Location	19°50′17″N 105°47′39″E; Near Thanh Hóa, Thanh Hóa Province, North Vietnam
Result	1965: North Vietnamese victory 1972: US victory

Belligerents
United States	North Vietnam

Casualties and losses
11 aircraft destroyed (1965), none (1972)	3 MiG-17 crashed (1965)

The Thanh Hóa Bridge (Vietnamese: Cầu Hàm Rồng, Hàm Rồng Bridge), spanning the Song Ma river, is situated 3 miles (4.8 km) northeast of Thanh Hóa, the capital of Thanh Hóa Province in Vietnam. The Vietnamese gave it the nickname Hàm Rồng (Dragon's Jaw). In 1965 during the Vietnam War, it was the objective of many attacks by US Air Force and US Navy aircraft which would fail to destroy the bridge until 1972, even after hundreds of attacks. The bridge was restored in 1973. As of 2016, the bridge still stands.

Originally built by the French during the colonial era in Vietnam, the Thanh Hóa bridge was sabotaged by the Viet Minh in 1945. From 1957, the Vietnamese started rebuilding it. Allowing the passage of both road and rail traffic, it was a vital link between different regions of North Vietnam, and when the war started, became a strategic passage for supplies and reinforcements sent to the Viet Cong fighting in South Vietnam.

In their first air combat, a small force of seemingly mismatched MiG-17s inflicted significant losses on much larger and more advanced American F-105 Thunderchief at a cost of three of their own, with an F-100 Super Sabre claiming the first probable American kill of the conflict. The encounter led to significant changes in American tactics and training, and a return to dog-fighting in air combat doctrine. Eventually, in 1972, the bridge was destroyed by USAF F-4 Phantoms using laser-guided bombs and US Navy Vought A-7s with advanced and conventional bombs.

== The bridge ==
It was a grey metallic construction, resting on a central concrete pier, and on concrete abutments at each extremity. Completed in 1964, and inaugurated by Ho Chi Minh, the final bridge was 540 feet (160 m) long, 56 feet (17 m) wide, and about 50 feet (15 m) above the river.

== Operation Rolling Thunder ==
With the beginning of Operation Rolling Thunder (the bombing campaign against random targets in North Vietnam chosen by Lyndon B. Johnson), the decision was made in March 1965 to interdict the North Vietnamese rail system, including the Thanh Hóa bridge. The Vietnamese, realizing the importance of the bridge, had set up an impressive air defense network, stationing five air defense regiments in the area.

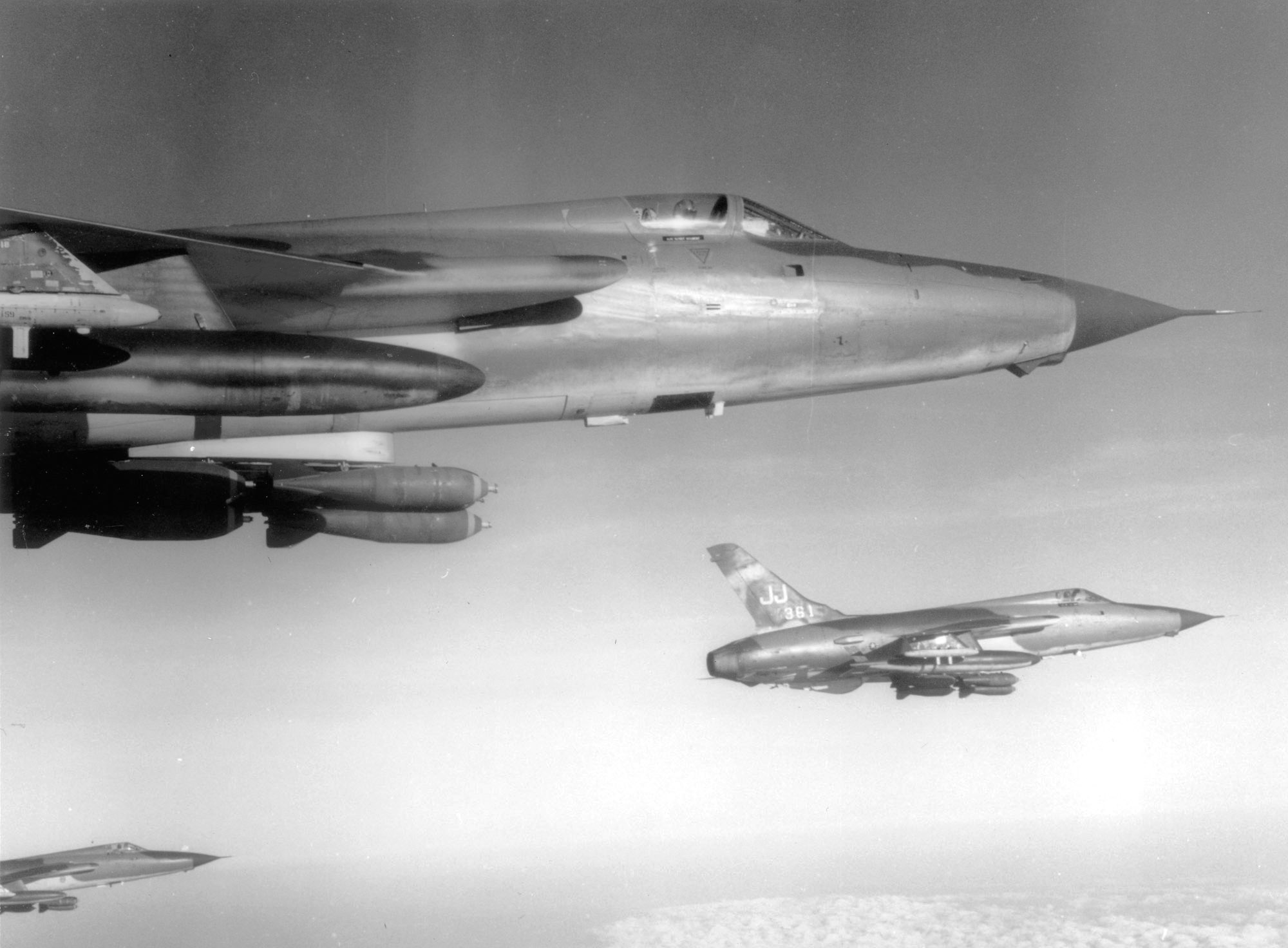
F-105Ds en route to North Vietnam.

=== First raid, first dogfight ===
The first — and largest — strike package to be sent against the bridge was codenamed 9-Alpha. Led by Korean War ace Colonel Robinson Risner, it comprised 79 aircraft, including 46 F-105 Thunderchiefs as the main strike force. Other types were 21 F-100 Super Sabres as AAA suppressors to attack ground-based guns, fourteen F-100s acting as MiG CAP (combat air patrol) and two RF-101C Voodoos to do damage assessment, plus ten KC-135 tanker aircraft.

The F-100s were based in South Vietnam, while the others were based across Thailand. Flights of four F-105s from Royal Thai Air Force Base (RTAFB) Korat and RTAFB Takhli would be air refueled over the Mekong River, then cross Laos to just south of the bridge. The bombers would continue east until over the Gulf of Tonkin.

Launched on April 3, 1965, the attack saw all strike aircraft deliver their payload. Sixteen of the F-105s carried a pair of Bullpup missiles, one under each outer wing pylon. This was an early combat use of early "smart" precision guided missiles that were guided by radio and joystick, requiring two passes to launch each of two missiles per plane. Capt. Bill Meyerholt observed as the missile streaked toward the bridge and made a good hit; when smoke cleared, there was no visible damage to the bridge. The 250 lb (110 kg) warheads merely charred the massive structure.

The other F-105s each carried three tons of explosives in the form of eight 750 lb (340 kg) bombs, more than B-17s had delivered over targets like Berlin. The first wave of bombs drifted due to a strong southwest wind. The last flight, led by Cpt. Carlyle S. "Smitty" Harris, scored hits on the roadway and superstructure. After 32 Bullpups and 1200 bombs had decorated the bridge with numerous hits, charring every part, the bridge did not fall, though traffic was stopped for a few hours. This was the only result of the raid, which had cost two aircraft — one F-100 (Lt. George C. Smith flying flak suppression) and one RF-101 — shot down.

Risner's Thunderchief was crippled by ground fire but, despite smoke in the cockpit, Risner continued to direct the strike before flying safely back to Da Nang.

To meet the raid, the VPAF (Vietnam People's Air Force) had sent out two flights of four MiG-17PFs from Noi Bai airbase at 09:47. The original plan was for the first flight to act as a decoy. The second flight never reached the strike force, as flight leader Pham Ngoc Lan spotted F-8E Crusaders from the USS Hancock covering the operation. The metal-finished MiG-17PF was an all-weather interceptor version of the MiG-17 first flown in 1951. Armed with three 23mm cannons but no missiles, it was a faster upgraded MiG-15 fitted with an afterburning engine, and a radar-ranging gunsight reverse-engineered from the F-86A (as well as a new, more sharply swept wing to increase its critical Mach number, therefore top speed).

By comparison, the American Crusader was a daylight gunfighter capable of speeds of nearly twice the speed of sound, armed with both cannon and Sidewinder missiles. Lan dived to attack at about 1,000 feet, and fired at a range of 700 feet. His gun camera showed a blazing F-8 which he reported had crashed. At 10:15 wingman Lieutenant Phan Van Tuc fired on another F-8, claiming a second victory. Pilots Ho Van Quy and Tran Minh Phuong also opened fire on two F-8s, but were out of gun range. In the VPAF's evaluation, their success was due to proper preparation, using surprise and engaging only in close dogfights. While the US Navy records that all of the Crusaders returned, a plane flown by Lt. Cdr. Spence Thomas was so damaged it diverted to Da Nang and was written off as destroyed upon landing. That could make Lan's attack the first air-to-air kill not only by the VPAF's MiG-17s, but the first air victory of the conflict.

The Navy recorded that an A-4 Skyhawk of Lt. Cdr. R. A. Vohden was lost to AAA; Vohden spent the rest of the war as a POW. After his victory, Lan found himself short on fuel. He elected to save his plane by making a hard landing by a riverbed in the Ke Tam valley (Nghệ An Province). He was besieged by locals who expected to find an American pilot until he showed his VPAF badge.

The VPAF had nevertheless demonstrated the ability to engage modern US fighters, and afterwards recognized April 3 as Air Force Day. On the American side, the failure to drop any spans led to a new attack scheduled for the next day; it was expected by VPAF commanders. This time, eighty planes were engaged, including 48 F-105s, carrying only 750 lb (340 kg) bombs, as the inadequacy of the Bullpup had been fully demonstrated.

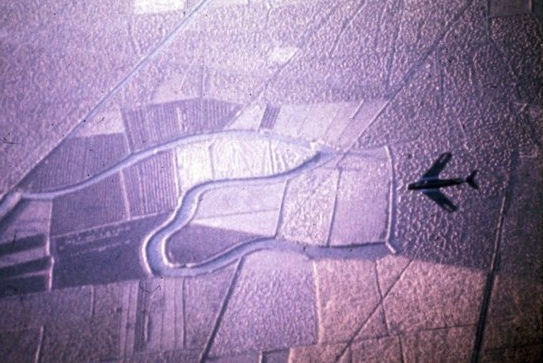
A North Vietnamese MiG-17 in 1972.

=== MiG-17s jump USAF F-105s ===
During the 4 April 1965 engagement, a force of eight MiG-17s (half flying as decoys) from the 921st "Sao Do" (Red Star) Fighter Regiment (FR) were again given the task of confronting a large group of modern American supersonic fighter-bombers. The 46 F-105 Thunderchiefs tasked as fast attack bombers were escorted by a flight of 21 F-100 Super Sabres daylight fighters from the 416th Tactical Fighter Squadron (416th TFS), four Sidewinder-armed for MiGCAP, and seventeen armed with 2.75-inch HVAR to suppress AAA batteries.

Each flight was given a call sign. These included "Steel", "Iron", "Copper", "Moon", "Carbon", "Zinc", "Argon", "Graphite", "Esso", "Mobil", "Shell", and "Petrol". "Cadillac" flight conducted Bomb Damage Assessment, while the search and rescue included A-1 Skyraiders, call sign "Sandy", and HH-3 Jolly Green Giant rescue helicopters, call sign "Jolly Green."

The VPAF made ground-based AAA sites the first line of defence, with fighters attacking after ground gunners ceased fire. After taking off at about 10:20, the MiGs would break into decoy and attack flights. The leader was second-in-command Nguyen Van Tien, while Dao Ngo Ngu handled the ground control command.

The Americans started with recon flights over Thanh Hóa. Then the attacking jets flew in flights of four. One flight would attack at a time while others circled awaiting their turn. Although, on paper, the F-105 was capable of Mach 2+, when loaded with ordnance under its small wings, it was subsonic and unready to tangle with any fighters that might get past the escorts. Covering the north, in the direction of Hanoi's airfields, escorting F-100s sixty miles north of the Song Chu estuary where the river meets the sea, were to warn of enemy aircraft and if possible to intercept, while four others orbited south of the estuary.

The MiG attack came instead from the south, with part angling off toward the west, perhaps to draw away escorts as a decoy. As the MIGCAP F-100s flew south, they spotted MiG-17s flying in from the sea toward the F-105s, and urgently radioed the warning: "Break off!" But their warnings weren't heeded due to garbled transmission. The strike aircraft flew on like sitting ducks, unaware of the incoming threat. While North Vietnam had full radar coverage and ground control of their pilots, the short-range, forward-scanning radars in the F-100s didn't spot the MiGs in a part of the sky where they were not expected. The USAF would later use EC-121s to provide full 360 degree radar coverage for strike packages.

Coming from clouds above, the MiG-17s tore past the escorts and dove onto the bomb-laden Thunderchiefs. Vietnamese flight leader Trần Hanh spotted four F-105Ds at 10:30 starting to drop their bombs, ordering his wingman, Pham Giay, to cover his attack. He fired at 400 meters, observing one F-105, piloted by Major Frank E. Bennett (355th TFW, KIA) fall in flames into the Gulf of Tonkin. The flight leader attempted to recover at Da Nang but had his controls freeze up within sight of the base. Ejecting, he was killed when his parachute failed to open before he struck the water.

As the F-105s turned to attack the MiGs, the MiGs split into two groups on the north and south sides of the bridge. Supported by Tran Nguyen Nam, Le Minh Huan downed another F-105D, callsign Zinc 2 piloted by Capt. J. A. Magnusson. He radioed that he was heading for the Gulf if he could maintain control of his aircraft. Magnusson finally bailed out twenty miles away over the Gulf of Tonkin near the island of Hon Me, and was eventually listed as missing and then killed after a 48-hour search. The USAF confirmed the two F-105 losses during that engagement.

The remaining F-105 found himself in the sights of another MiG-17 whom he could not shake. In desperation, he tried a snap roll which slowed his plane so that the MiG-17 over-shot him, as his captain had recommended. Finding himself on the MiG's tail, he was too surprised to attempt to shoot down the MiG with his gun. The fortunate pilot was briefed the day before about this maneuver by Captain John Boyd from Nellis Air Force Base, who would later become a significant voice in the design of America's fighter aircraft.

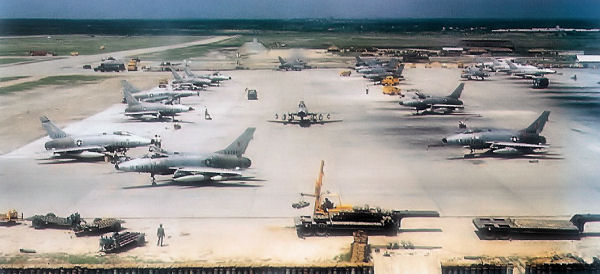
416th TFS F-100Ds at Da Nang, 1965

After the quick success of downing two American fighters, the outnumbered North Vietnamese defenders faced the remaining F-100s and F-105s now fully alerted to their presence and turning their attention to the MiGs. Tran Hanh ordered his flight to split into two groups. He and wingman Pham Giay stayed south of the bridge, while Le Minh Huan and Tran Nguyen Nam flew to the north. Three F-100s from the MiGCAP, piloted by LTC Emmett L. Hays, CPT Keith B. Connolly, and CPT Donald W. Kilgus, all from the 416th TFS, engaged the MiG-17s. As the F-100s closed in, they hesitated to fire missiles which might hit their F-105s. The lead F-100 got a locking tone as he fired an IR guided Sidewinder air-to-air missile once he had a clear shot, but it passed above its target, while Connolly and Kilgus engaged with 20mm cannon.

Kilgus recognized what was Pham Giay's MiG just after it appeared out of the haze. He dropped his wing tanks and turned into the target that had just made a ninety degree turn to face him. He shook off Tran Hanh's second MiG which appeared as Giay overshot and missed him. Closing in from behind Giay, Kilgus closed in and pulled up his nose so that the four M39 20mm guns would bear on the target. Lighting his afterburner and using his height advantage, he accelerated and dived after the MiG at 450 knots. Kilgus recognized the Vietnamese pilot was pulling him into a game of chicken as both jets hurtled down toward the waters of the Gulf of Tonkin and the lighter MiG should have been able pull out of a dangerous dive more quickly. Now headed nearly straight down, Kilgus armed his guns and took aim at the spot projected on the glass of his A4 radar-ranging gunsight. While worrying about the rapidly falling altitude, he opened fire at 7,100 feet, observing puffs and sparks coming off Giay's vertical tail fin before losing visual contact as he pulled up, just barely clearing the water.

Historian Don McCarthy later concluded he was certain Kilgus brought down the MiG-17. Aviation writer Larry Davis also records that Kilgus' wing man also reported a kill, but it was denied by higher headquarters at 7th Air Force. Although not immediately reported that day, only Kilgus claimed and was credited with a probable kill. Based upon the report, the F-100s had obtained the first US aerial combat victories during the Vietnam War. If confirmed, Kilgus would have made the only air-to-air MiG kill by an F-100 during the conflict, while it was assumed the other MiGs escaped.

MiG-17 flight leader and sole survivor Tran Hanh was credited with his confirmed F-105 kill. His own plane narrowly escaped through hard maneuvering, but he lost contact with ground control. Low on fuel, he opted to land at the nearby Ke Tam valley, but was detained by the locals until he produced his VPAF badge. Hanh says that he saw his wingman, Le Minh Huan and Tran Nguyen Nam also shot down by F-105s. Hanh probably confused the escorting F-100s for F-105s. As only one American pilot even claimed a probable kill, his other comrades may have instead collided or been hit by their own AA fire. Nevertheless, in exchange for their significant sacrifice, the North Vietnamese MiG-17s had scored their first confirmed aerial victories in jet-to-jet combat against supersonic fighters.

North Vietnamese AAA gunners on the ground were credited with downing a "Sandy" A-1H Skyraider, killing Capt. Walter Draeger, and also initially credited with the F-105 of Capt. Carlyle "Smitty" Harris, who survived and became one of the earliest American prisoners of war. Later on 15 April 1965, a communist publication interviewed a MiG pilot who had actually shot down Capt. Harris' F-105 rather than ground fire. Harris was classified MIA, but had been actually captured and was imprisoned in Hanoi until 1973.

In North Vietnam, MiG-17 flight leader Tran Hanh became a national hero. After losing all of their defending fighters and three pilots, in retrospect the action might seem to be a tactical draw, but it was nonetheless celebrated as a "glorious victory over US aircraft to ensure the flow of war supplies to the south". For their part, anti-aircraft gunners received the Victory Order and the Military Exploit Order. On the 45th anniversary of the battle in 2010, Vietnam celebrated the downing of 47 US aircraft of the 454 sorties over two days that dropped 350 bombs on and around the bridge, calling it "the symbol of the Vietnamese people's will to defend their country...the Great Spring Victory to liberate the South and reunify the country."

== American lessons ==
The raid had been carried out with great precision, but despite having been hit by more than 300 bombs, the Thanh Hóa bridge still stood. As minor damage caused the circulation to be interrupted for a few days, it was seen as a modest success that had cost the US Air Force three F-105s. But U.S. Air Force chief of staff General John P. McConnell, was "hopping mad" to hear that two of America's most advanced F-105 Thunderchiefs had been shot down by slow, elderly left-over MIGs of the tiny 36-jet North Vietnamese air force.

The subsonic MiG-17s had been in service for over twelve years since 1953, and were barely improved over the original MiG-15s that sparred with F-86 Sabres in dogfights during the Korean War. By contrast, the F-105, which was on the drawing boards as the MiG entered service, was two generations ahead (and the escorting F-100s one generation ahead). The F-105 was the USAF's most advanced Mach 2 class fighter bomber, with sophisticated navigation and radar systems which could be armed with Sidewinder missiles and a bombload comparable to World War II bombers. But at slower speeds, the older MiG could outmaneuver any of its adversaries, and at a time when air-to-air missiles were highly unlikely to actually destroy their targets, the cannons of the MiG were much more reliable, and deadly against F-105s, which at the time were vulnerable to hits on systems such as hydraulics.

The losses to MiGs resulted in the subsequent replacement of the F-100 Super Sabre escorts with F-4 Phantoms. The incident would start a series of events that would lead to a reassessment of fighters better suited to close-in dogfighting. While the F-105 would finish off its service with a slightly better than even kill-to-loss ratio over MiGs, the large plane had been designed primarily to deliver bombs at low level rather than shoot down other fighters. Its replacement was the Phantom, which had been designed without any guns to fire missiles at stand-off ranges rather than tangle in turning dogfights.

This experience would re-introduce the requirement that future fighters would need to be able to mix with MiGs on more equal terms and not just shoot missiles from a distance. This would lead to training programs such as TOPGUN. The expensive swing-wing F-111B, which could not dogfight, was dropped by the Navy in favor of the VFAX, which evolved into the F-14 Tomcat. The USAF would develop its own purpose-built FX supersonic air superiority fighter as the F-15 Eagle along with smaller Teen Series fighters. The new fighters that came on line during the 1970s would dominate American airpower for the remainder of the 20th century and inspire similar Soviet designs.

== US Navy attacks ==
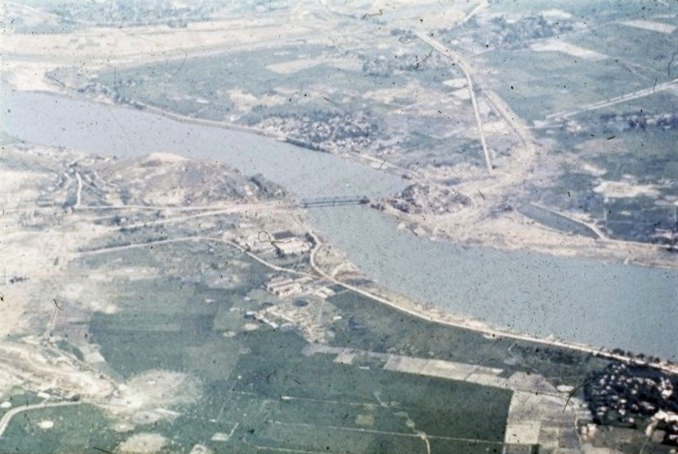
The Thanh Hóa bridge in 1972.

With the establishment of the Route Package system, the Thanh Hóa area was allocated to the US Navy. Between 1965 and 1968, until US President Lyndon B. Johnson temporarily called off air raids against North Vietnam, the bridge was a regular objective for navy Alpha strikes. Different types of aircraft were engaged including A-3 Skywarriors, A-4 Skyhawks, A-6 Intruders, F-4 Phantoms and F-8 Crusaders.

Several types of weapons were launched at the bridge including AGM-62 Walleye missiles, but none had the precision and power to destroy it permanently. Several times, traffic over the bridge was interrupted, but every time, the North Vietnamese dutifully repaired the damage.

== Operation Carolina Moon ==
In May 1966, an innovative attack, Operation Carolina Moon, was planned by the US Air Force. A new weapon was to be used: a large magnetic mine, that implemented a new energy mass-focusing concept. The plan was to float the mines down the river, till they reached the bridge, where the magnetic sensors would set off the charges, hopefully wrecking it permanently. The only aircraft with a large enough hold to carry these weapons was the slow-flying C-130 Hercules transport, so the operation was due to take place at night, to reduce its vulnerability.

On the night of May 30, a first Hercules dropped five mines. A North Vietnamese prisoner later revealed that 4 of the 5 mines had in fact exploded under the bridge, but not caused any significant damage. However, at the time the Americans did not know this, as after-mission reconnaissance had shown the bridge still standing, and a second raid was planned, with a different crew, for the following night. This second attempt turned to disaster: the Hercules was hit during its low-level run and crashed, killing the entire crew. An F-4 engaged in a diversionary attack nearby was also brought down and its crew lost.

== The final blow ==
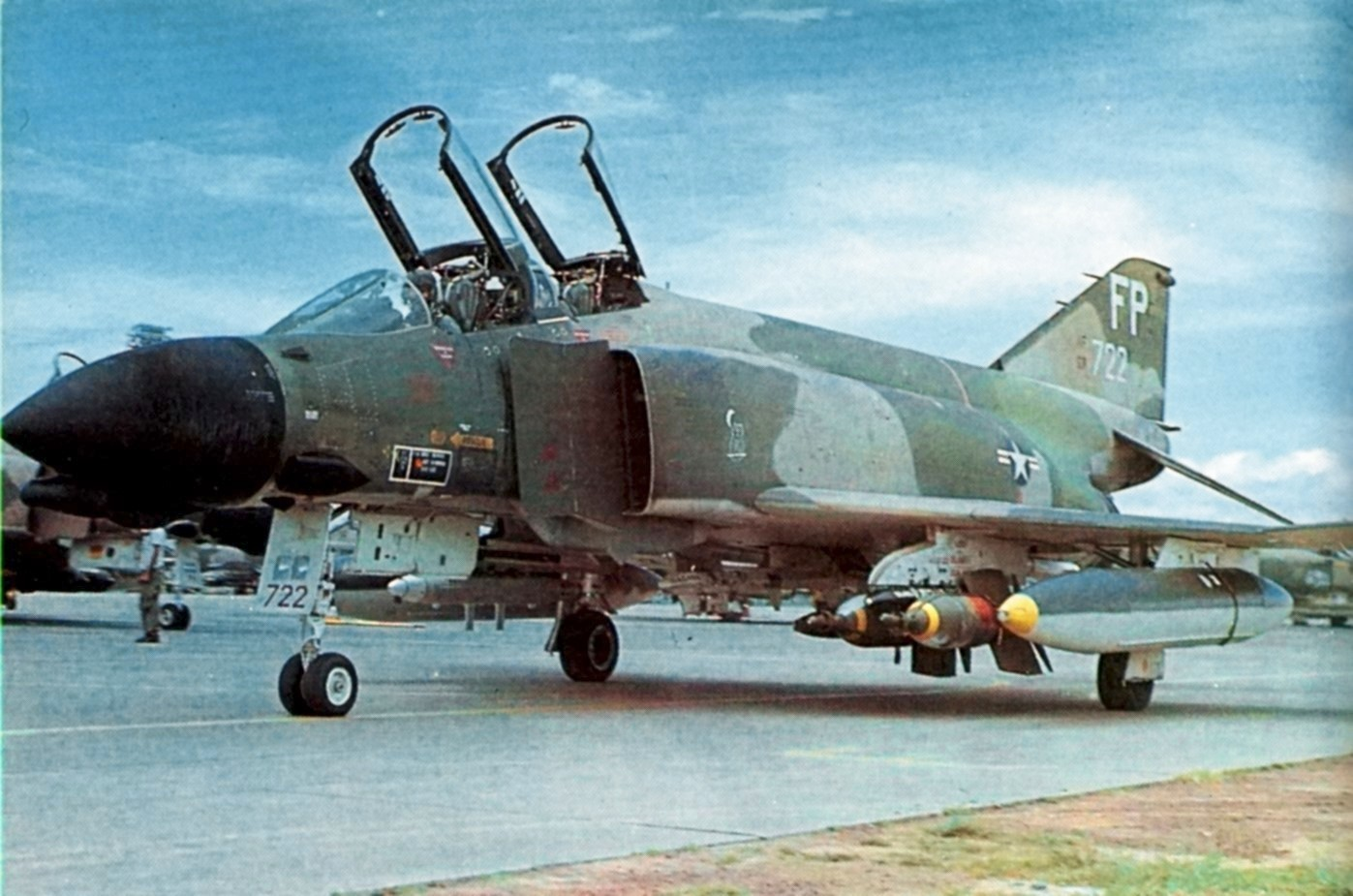
F-4D carrying BOLT-117 laser-guided bombs

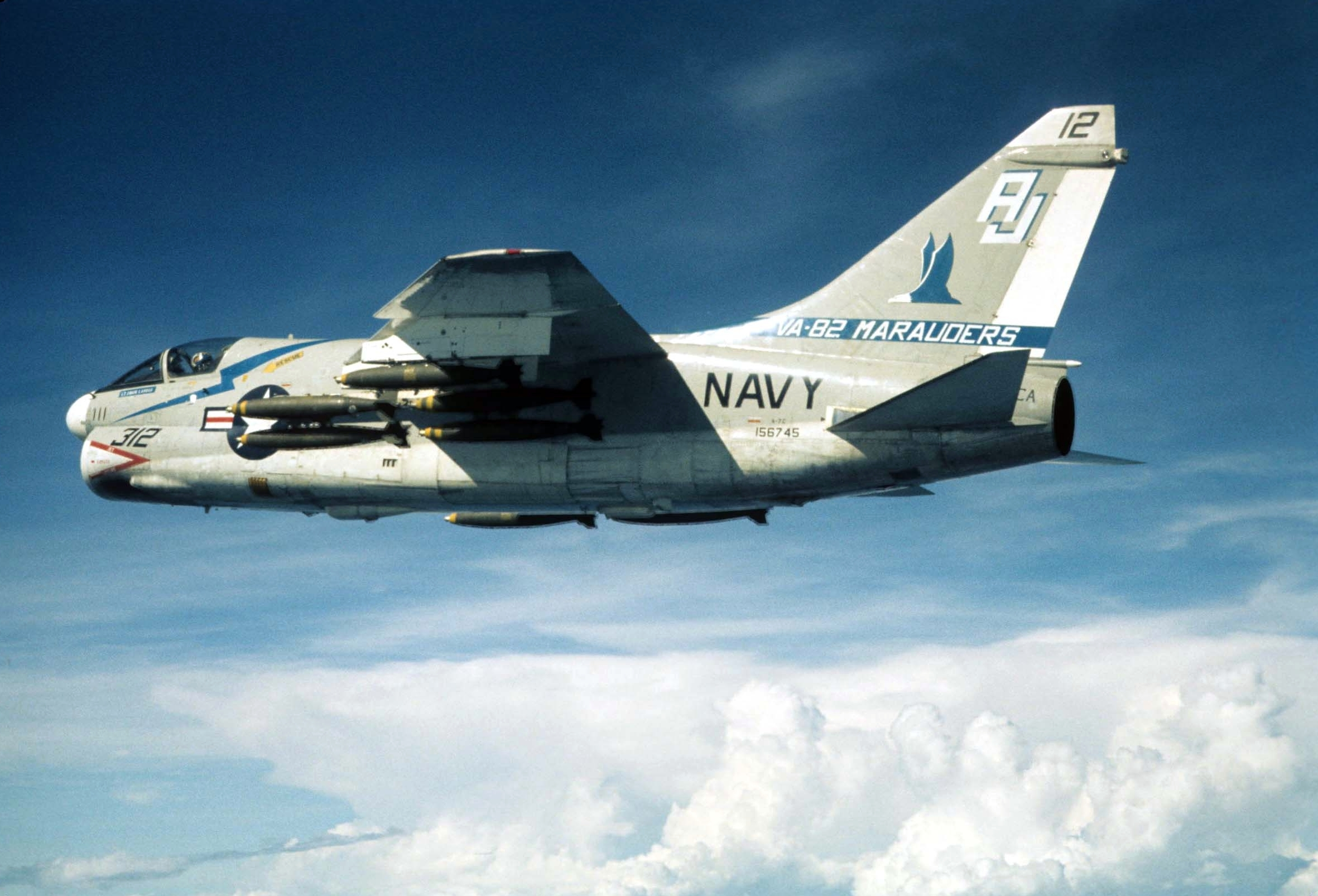
A-7C of VA-82 operating in SE Asia

Between 1968 and 1972, bombing of North Vietnam was discontinued, enabling the North Vietnamese to repair their infrastructures, including the Thanh Hóa bridge. With the communist invasion of South Vietnam in 1972, a new bombing campaign was instituted: Operation Linebacker.

On 27 April, twelve Phantoms of the 8th Tactical Fighter Wing, based at Ubon, Thailand attacked the Thanh Hóa Bridge. Eight of their number carried laser-guided bombs. The raid was carried out without a hitch, and when the dust of the explosions had cleared it became apparent that the bridge had been dislodged from its western abutment, dropping one half into the river. To complete its destruction, a second attack was scheduled for the thirteenth of May when fourteen Phantoms were engaged, with LGBs of up to 2,000 lb (910 kg) aimed at the central pillar supporting the bridge. Once again, the attack was successful, and the "Dragon's jaw" was rendered completely unusable. The US command, however, was not satisfied, and ordered a final attack on the sixth of October.

This time, four U.S. Navy A-7s from VA-82, aboard USS America, successfully delivered 8,000 lbs of high explosives with two planes carrying two 2,000 lb (910 kg) Walleyes, while two other carried a further 2,000 lbs in Mk 84 GP bombs. In a simultaneous attack, the center piling on the bridge's west side was hit and broke the span in half. After this, the Thanh Hóa Bridge was considered permanently destroyed and removed from the target list.

== Aftermath and losses ==
The North Vietnamese made various claims as to how many planes they shot down, but the US only recognizes the loss of eleven aircraft during attacks against the bridge. However, the concentration of air defense assets also took its toll on passing aircraft and in total an estimated 104 American pilots were shot down over a 75-square-mile (190 km^{2}) area around the bridge during the war.

873 air sorties were expended against the bridge and it was hit by hundreds of bombs and missiles before finally being destroyed. It became something of a symbol of resistance for the North Vietnamese, and various legends of invincibility were attached to it. For the US planners it became an obsession, and many raids were planned against it despite their unpopularity with the pilots. A cynical rewording of the song the "Red River Valley" was sung by fighter pilots, referring to this dangerous target.

In his 1976 essay collection, Mauve Gloves & Madmen, Clutter and Vine, Tom Wolfe recounted a rueful story that circulated among Navy pilots who flew sorties against the Thanh Hóa Bridge. In their telling, the Earth consisted of two hemispheres, spring-loaded and held together opposite the hinge by the bridge. When it was destroyed, the story went, the two hemispheres would fly apart, flinging humanity into space.

While the first employment of the Bullpup in 1965 proved a disappointment, the ultimate destruction of the bridge finally proved the promise and effectiveness of precision-guided munitions, opening the way to a new era of aerial warfare. The 1965 strikes were the first employment of modern strike packages which were combined and launched against that specific target, leading up to an evolution of air warfare to 1972 with laser-guided munitions, which would later be employed very effectively with minimal losses in Operation Desert Storm in 1991. The shock of losing modern fighters in dogfights in 1965 was a landmark which led to a major shift in fighter design, away from interceptors firing missiles to agile designs capable in short-range air combat.
