= Aaron Cupples =

Australian film composer

- Born: Aaron Nicolas Cupples
- Genres: Experimental rock, alternative rock, electronic, avant garde
- Occupations: Film Composer, Record Producer, Songwriter, audio engineer, musician
- Instruments: Guitar, bass guitar, keyboards, synthesizer, sampler, drum machine,
- Website: www.aaroncupples.com

Aaron Nicolas Cupples is an Australian film composer, record producer, and mix engineer based in London, UK, known for his innovative and experimental approach to music. He often constructs bespoke instruments from unconventional materials to create distinctive soundscapes.

Cupples gained recognition with his score for the 2018 documentary Island of the Hungry Ghosts, which premiered at the Tribeca Film Festival and went on to win the Best Documentary award. The score was also nominated for Best Music at the British Independent Film Awards. The soundtrack has been described as "otherworldly and experimental" with a "supernatural aura" and was created with oversized, stretched and augmented wire instrumentation. It was ranked as #3 Soundtrack Of The Year by MOJO magazine. The soundtrack was released on PAN records in 2021.

His recent work includes the soundtrack for GOLIATH: PLAYING WITH REALITY, narrated by Tilda Swinton, which won the Grand Jury Prize at the Venice International Film Festival in 2021 and received an Emmy nomination in 2022. He is also the composer for Gabrielle Brady's feature film The Wolves Always Come at Night, which premiered at the 2024 Toronto International Film Festival (TIFF).

As a record producer, he has worked with a diverse range of artists, including Spiritualized, Blanck Mass, The Drones, Tropical Fuck Storm, Kirin J Callinan, and his own band CIVIL CIVIC. He produced and mixed two albums included in an industry-voted ’100 Greatest Australian Records Of All Time’ list.

== Awards ==
Year	Organisation	Award	Result
2018	British Independent Film Awards	Best Music	Nominated
2019	OZZIES	Best Original Soundtrack	Nominated
2019	Aubagne International Film Festival	Best Original Soundtrack	Nominated
