= Civil Civic =

Australian band

- Origin: Melbourne, Australia
- Genres: Post-punk, noise rock
- Years active: 2009–present
- Members: Aaron Cupples; Benjamin Green
- Website: civilcivic.com

Civil Civic are an instrumental post-punk/electronic rock band consisting of two Australian musicians, Aaron Cupples (guitar, synth) and Benjamin Green (bass, synth), formed in 2009. Aaron currently resides in London, UK, and Benjamin lives in Barcelona, Spain. They employ a drum machine which is referred to as the third member of the band and is called 'The Box'. Their sound has been compared with bands such as Gang Of Four, The Pixies, My Bloody Valentine, The Cure, The Smiths, Sonic Youth and Joy Division. Their live shows have been described as "a perfectly synchronised mesh of electro pop and cheek-vibrating space noise" with a "stage presence and lust for playing that exhilarates in the extreme".

== History ==
2008 – 2009: formation
The band was conceived by music producer Aaron Cupples who uploaded some home recorded demos to Myspace in 2008. In looking for a bandmate to realise the project he contacted Benjamin Green who responded enthusiastically. Aaron flew to Barcelona where they jammed for 2 weeks and CIVIL CIVIC was born. They had not met prior to this. The concept was to make music that was highly energetic and intellectual without being overly dense and un-danceable. Their output so far has been wholly instrumental.

2010: first EP and single
In March 2010 they self-released a 5 track EP titled 'EP1' on 100 limited edition cassette tapes. MP3's of the lead single 'Less Unless' were widely blogged about and the single eventually reached number 1 on The Hype Machine popular charts. The single was also featured in NME for the first time. They initially adopted a D.I.Y approach and booked all their shows themselves but were picked up by the Julie Tippex booking agency in late 2010.

On 8 June 2010 the band were The Guardian 'new band of the day' just prior to their follow up single "Run Overdrive" which was self-released in July 2010 on 500 limited edition 7" vinyl.

In November 2010 the single "Lights On A Leash" was released on 500 limited edition 7" vinyl on the Too Pure label

2011: debut album
The band's debut full-length album was released in November 2011, it was praised by many bloggers and some mainstream press including Artrocker who gave it a 5 Star feature review

2012: touring and visa complications
Civil Civic suffered a major setback with complications regarding Aaron's visa renewal process, the result was 6 weeks without a passport and the cancellation of 25 European shows. The band did tour later in the year culminating with a show at France's La Route Du Rock festival where the band played after Spiritualized.

2013 – present
Since 2010 the band have been touring consistently playing over 160 shows in 4 years They are currently working on their second album after a successful crowd-funding campaign.

2014: R. Stevie Moore collaboration
CIVIL CIVIC collaborated with R. Stevie Moore to produce the single "When You Gonna Find Me A Wife?" released by Remote Control Records

2016: second album Their second album, The Test, was released on 14 October 2016.

== Discography ==
- EP1 – (EP) self-released (March 2010)
- "Run Overdrive"/"Fuck Youth" – (7" single) self-released (July 2010)
- "Lights On A Leash" – (7" single) Too Pure (November 2010)
- Rules – (LP) Gross Domestic Product (November 2011)
- "When You Gonna Find Me A Wife?" with R. Stevie Moore – (single) Remote Control Records (September 2014)
- The Test – (LP) Gross Domestic Product (October 2016)

== Awards ==
Year	Organisation	Award	Result
2011	Artrocker Awards	Heavy Band Of The Year	Nominated
