= Dos Estaciones =

2022 film

- Spanish: Dos Estaciones
- Directed by: Juan Pablo González
- Written by: Juan Pablo González, Ana Isabel Fernández, Ilana Coleman
- Produced by: Jamie Gonçalves; Ilana Coleman; Bruna Haddad; Makena Buchanan
- Starring: Teresa Sánchez; Rafaela Fuentes; Tatín Vera; Manuel García Rulfo
- Cinematography: Gerardo Guerra
- Edited by: Lívia Serpa; Juan Pablo González
- Music by: Carmina Escobar
- Production company: Sin Sitio Cine
- Distributed by: Cinema Guild
- Release dates: 24 January 2022 (Sundance Film Festival); 16 September 2022 (USA theatrical)
- Running time: 99 minutes
- Countries: Mexico; United States; France
- Language: Spanish

Dos Estaciones is a 2022 Mexican-Spanish language drama film directed by Juan Pablo González. It premiered in the World Cinematic Dramatic Competition at the 2022 Sundance Film Festival, where lead actress Teresa Sánchez won the Special Jury Prize for Acting.

The film has won awards and screened at festivals such as New Directors/New Films at MoMA and the Lincoln Center, San Sebastián, Edinburgh, Morelia, New Horizons, Athens, Zurich, Bogota International Film Festival, Vancouver International Film Festival, and Mostra São Paulo, among others.

Dos Estaciones participated at the Venice Biennale Cinema-College and the Sundance Institute’s Creative Producing Fellowship.

== Plot ==
The film centers 50 year old María García, the owner of Dos Estaciones, a once-majestic tequila factory struggling to stay afloat and the final hold-over from generations of Mexican-owned tequila plants in the highlands of Jalisco; the rest have folded to foreign corporations. Once one of the wealthiest people in town, María knows her current financial situation is untenable. When a persistent plague and an unexpected flood cause irreversible damage, Maria is forced to do everything she can to save her community's main source of economy and pride.

== Cast ==
- Teresa Sánchez as María García
- Rafaela Fuentes as Rafita
- Tatín Vera as Tatís
- Manuel García Rulfo as Pepe

== Accolades ==
Year	Award	Category	Result	Ref.
2022	Sundance Film Festival	Best Actor – Teresa Sánchez	Won	
2022	Outfest	Grand Jury Prize - Best Screenplay	Won	
2022	Gotham Awards	Gotham Independent Film Award for Best Feature	Nominated	
2022	Independent Film Festival Boston	Grand Jury Prize	Won	
2022	Morelia International Film Festival	Best Actress - Teresa Sánchez	Won	
2022	True/False Film Festival	True Vision Award	Won	
2022	Lucca Film Festival	Special Jury Prize: Acting Teresa Sánchez	Won	

== Critical response ==
Writing for The Hollywood Reporter, Sheri Linden said "It's rare when a debut feature strikes the perfect balance of ingredients and especially rare when it does so in a distinctive and memorable way."

Manohla Dargis for The New York Times named the film a NYT Critics' Pick and called it "visually arresting."
