= Izzy Gets the F*ck Across Town =

2017 film by Christian Papierniak

- Theatrical release poster
- Directed by: Christian Papierniak
- Written by: Christian Papierniak
- Produced by: Christian Papierniak; Meghan Lennox; Mackenzie Davis; Melissa Panzer
- Starring: Mackenzie Davis; Carrie Coon; Alex Russell; Alia Shawkat
- Cinematography: Alexandre Naufel
- Edited by: Zach Clark; Micah Stuart; Christian Papierniak
- Music by: Andrew Brassell
- Production company: Amateur Detective Films
- Distributed by: Shout! Studios
- Release dates: June 17, 2017 (LA Film Festival); June 22, 2018 (United States)
- Running time: 86 minutes
- Country: United States
- Language: English
- Box office: $20,208

Izzy Gets the F*ck Across Town is a 2017 American comedy-drama film written and directed by Christian Papierniak. The film stars Mackenzie Davis as a woman at rock bottom who must find her way across Los Angeles in order to crash her ex-boyfriend's engagement party. The film had its world premiere at the LA Film Festival on June 17, 2017. It was released theatrically in the United States on June 22, 2018, by Shout! Studios.

== Cast ==
- Mackenzie Davis as Izzy
  - Ryan Simpkins as young Izzy
- Carrie Coon as Virginia
- Alex Russell as Roger
- Alia Shawkat as Agatha Benson
- Lauren Miller Rogen as Ellen Wexler
- Haley Joel Osment as Walt
- Annie Potts as Mary
- Lakeith Stanfield as George
- Melinda McGraw as Mrs. Percy
- Brandon T. Jackson as Dick
- Rob Huebel as Bennett
- Meghan Lennox as Casey
- Luka Jones as Leo
- Sarah Goldberg as Whitney
- Kyle Kinane as Rabbit
- Salme Geransar as Gypsy
- Matt Riker as Andy Wexler

== Release ==
Izzy Gets the F*ck Across Town had its world premiere at the LA Film Festival on June 17, 2017. In November 2017, Shout! Studios acquired distribution rights to the film. It was given a limited theatrical release in the United States on June 22, 2018.

== Soundtrack ==
No.	Title	Writer(s)	Performer(s)	Length
1.	"axemen"	Corin Tucker	Mackenzie Davis, Carrie Coon and Andrew Brassell
2.	"Terrorist"	Corin Tucker	Heavens to Betsy
3.	"axemen"	Corin Tucker	Heavens to Betsy
4.	"History Eraser"	Courtney Barnett	Courtney Barnett
5.	"Pray for Rain"	Daniel Hindman and Sarah Versprille	Pure Bathing Culture
6.	"Ivory Coast"	Daniel Hindman and Sarah Versprille	Pure Bathing Culture
7.	"Fuck You (Izzy Theme)"	Andrew Brassell	Andrew Brassell and Tristen Gaspadarek
8.	"Done Faking"	Andrew Brassell and Hailey Collier	Shirley Tempo
9.	"Studying the Black Arts"	Andrew Brassell	Andrew Brassell
10.	"Doesn't Feel Like Christmas"	Dallas Preston Kruse and Doll Knight	Dallas & Doll
11.	"That's When I'll Stop Loving You"	Billy Earl Kennedy and Jack Edward Thomas	Belita Woods

The soundtrack for the film was nominated at the 2019 Guild of Music Supervisors Awards for "Best Film Budgeted Under 5 Million Dollars".

== Reception ==
On review aggregator website Rotten Tomatoes, the film holds an approval rating of 56% based on 41 reviews, and the critics' consensus that it "has all the restless energy viewers might expect given the title, but it's only sporadically channeled into a meaningful story." On Metacritic, the film has a weighted average score of 51 out of 100, based on 18 critics, indicating "mixed or average" reviews.

== Accolades ==
The film won the award for Best Narrative Feature at the 2017 Tacoma Film Festival, where Davis was also awarded Best Actor. Davis won Best Breakout Performance at that year's Napa Valley Film Festival. In 2018, the screenplay for the film was permanently added to the Core Collection at the Academy of Motion Picture Arts and Sciences' Margaret Herrick Library.
