= Caballerango =

2018 Mexican documentary film by Juan Pablo González

- Directed by: Juan Pablo González
- Produced by: Makena Buchana, Ilana Coleman, Jamie Gonçalves, Juan Pablo González
- Cinematography: Jim Hickcox
- Edited by: Isidore Bethel; Ilana Coleman; Sebastián Salfate
- Production company: Sin Sitio Cine
- Distributed by: Grasshopper Film, MUBI
- Release date: November 14, 2018 (IDFA)
- Running time: 62 minutes
- Country: Mexico
- Language: Spanish

Caballerango (Horse Wrangler) is a 2018 Mexican documentary film, director Juan Pablo González's debut feature. It's a portrait of residents of Milpillas in Los Altos de Jalisco as they grapple with the sudden death of a young horse wrangler named Nando. The editing alternates wide shots of landscape and community with more intimate scenes where the director, a native of the region himself, asks questions of those onscreen. Gradually, Nando's death starts to look like it might have been a suicide. It also becomes clear that the community's still reeling from the loss of several other young people. The mysterious circumstances of their demise dovetail with globalization's effects on the community: a drop in farming jobs and population exodus from the region. The film expands upon material that González's Cannes Critics' Week short, "¿Por qué el recuerdo?" ("The Solitude of Memory"), previously broached. It displays dimensions of slow cinema and includes only 37 shots across its 62-minute duration.

The film's production occurred between 2013 and 2017, and it received support from the Sundance Institute, the Ford Foundation, the Austin Film Society, and the California Institute of the Arts, where González is a professor.

== Reception ==
The film premiered in IDFA's Luminous section in 2018. It then screened at numerous other festivals, including True/False, Full Frame, and Camden, winning Guadalajara's Best Jalisco Film Award, Tacoma's Best Documentary and Best Cinematography Awards, and Dallas's Special Grand Jury Award. González went on to receive the Vilcek Foundation's 2021 Prize for Creative Promise in Filmmaking in part for his work on Caballerango.

The film received a warm critical response. The New York Times called it a "miracle of nonfiction portraiture." RogerEbert.com named it "one of the best films at" the 2019 True/False Film Festival. Vox wrote that "the filmmakers effectively transplant the painful feelings of the Milpillas community into the hearts of the audience and spotlight the magnitude of their tragedy." Indiewire called the film a "must-see" and characterized it as an "evocatively spare, slow-burn documentary spellbinder." Remezcla also included Caballerango on its "must-see" list.
