= Time Bomb Y2K =

- Official poster
- Directed by: Marley McDonald; Brian Becker
- Produced by: Brian Becker
- Edited by: Marley McDonald; Maya Mumma
- Music by: Nathan Micay
- Production companies: HBO Documentary Films; Spinning Nancy
- Distributed by: HBO
- Release dates: March 3, 2023 (True/False); December 30, 2023
- Running time: 84 minutes
- Country: United States
- Language: English

Time Bomb Y2K is a 2023 American documentary film, directed by Marley McDonald and Brian Becker. An all-archival film, it explores the Year 2000 problem, and the mass hysteria surrounding it.

It had its world premiere at True/False Film Festival on March 3, 2023, and was released on December 30, 2023, by HBO.

== Premise ==
An all-archival film, Time Bomb Y2K explores the Year 2000 problem, and the ensuing mass hysteria to evade potential technological collapse or, at worst, a doomsday scenario.

== Production ==
McDonald and Becker became friends while previously working together on Spaceship Earth. After opting to collaborate, they settled on co-directing a film revolving around the Year 2000 problem. They decided together that the project would be compromised entirely of archival material. To gather documentation of the period surrounding the dawn of the new millennium, Becker and McDonald openly solicited contributions of homemade footage, visited subjects' homes looking for videotapes they might have saved, and secured footage from the Center for Home Movies. In total, they viewed over 750 hours of footage for the film.

In June 2022, the film was officially announced with McDonald and Becker as co-directors, Penny Lane as executive producer, and HBO Documentary Films producing with HBO distributing.

== Release ==
The film had its world premiere at True/False Film Festival on March 3, 2023. It also screened at Hot Docs International Film Festival on April 29, 2023, DC/DOX Festival in June 2023, Camden International Film Festival on September 17, 2023, the Virginia Film Festival on October 28, 2023, and DOC NYC on November 15, 2023.

The film was publicly released on December 30, 2023 on HBO.

== Reception ==
Critics highlighted the film's remarkable use of archival materials and its nostalgic yet prescient view of technological, cultural, and political crisis. For Chris Vognar of Rolling Stone, "Time Bomb Y2K works mostly because it keeps a straight face, acknowledging that, even if a lot of the hysteria seems silly now, the anxiety was quite real back then," comparatively "a more innocent time, before the flowering of surveillance capitalism and the days of other countries using the internet to interfere in American elections." With regards to the film's contemporary relevance, CNN's Brian Lowry noted that "Time Bomb Y2k still speaks to the excesses of that earlier period in a way that connects directly to the present, providing a taste of how media frenzies happen filtered through the 20th century's final freakout."
