= Darius Clark Monroe =

American filmmaker

- Born: November 11, 1980 (age 45); Houston, Texas, U.S.
- Education: University of Houston, NYU Tisch School of the Arts
- Occupations: writer, producer, director
- Website: vimeo.com/daclamo

Darius Clark Monroe (born 1980) is a writer, producer, and director, living and working in Brooklyn, New York.

== Early life and robbery ==
Monroe was born in Houston, Texas. As a teenager, Monroe robbed a bank in Stafford, Texas; which resulted in him being sentenced to 5 years in prison.

== Filmmaking ==
=== Filmography ===
==== Evolution of a Criminal (2014) ====
Monroe's feature debut, Evolution of a Criminal, World Premiered at SXSW 2014. The film won awards at the Full Frame Documentary Film Festival (Grand Jury Prize, Center for Documentary Studies Filmmaker Award) and Dallas International Film Festival (Special Jury Prize). Produced by Monroe, Daniel Patterson, and Keith Davis; and, executive produced by Spike Lee; filmmaker Darius Monroe returns to his home town and to the bank where he committed the crime, examining and confronting how his actions affected the lives of his family, friends, and victims. Evolution of a Criminal started as a project of Monroe’s at NYU’s film school.

==== Black 14 (2018) ====
Released in 2018, Black 14 is a documentary set in 1969 detailing the lives of 14 black student athletes who were dismissed from the University of Wyoming's football team for protesting against racial harassment and racial discrimination in The Church of Jesus Christ of Latter-day Saints. Monroe utilizes historic footage in his 15 minute documentary to probe the role the media coverage played in representing and manufacturing public perception of the protest. Black 14 played at the Tribeca Film Festival.

=== Exhibitions ===
Darius Clark Monroe participated in the 2019 Whitney Biennial, curated by Rujeko Hockley and Jane Panetta. Monroe presented four short documentary films as part of the 2019 Biennial's dedicated screening program. The films, all on racquet sports, are titled: South Oxford (2019), All Iowa Lawn Tennis Club (2019), Maravilla (2019), and Serve (2019). Monroe's films played alongside Jenn Nkiru’s film, BLACK TO TECHNO.
