= Miko Revereza =

Filipino film director

Miko Revereza is an experimental filmmaker from Manila. Revereza lived in the United States as an undocumented immigrant; an experience which informs his work. He holds an MFA from Bard College, but has no undergraduate degree. In 2021, he won the Vilcek Prize for Creative Promise in Filmmaking and his short films have been featured by the Criterion Collection.

No Data Plan was filmed during a cross-country train journey by Revereza and includes audio from conversations with his mother about immigration held on a burner phone. It was listed as one of the best films of 2019 by BFI's Sight & Sound International Film Magazine, Hyperallergic, and CNN Philippines. The film was screened at several locations, including the Smithsonian's National Museum of Asian Art and the National Gallery of Art.

In Nowhere Near, the filmmaker returns to the Philippines to reckon with a "family curse" and the legacy of imperialism. It was included in the Marché du Film de Cannes Docs Showcase. It received funding through a Purin Pictures grant, the Open City Documentary Festival's Assembly Grant, and the International Film Festival Rotterdam's Hubert Bals Fund Bright Future Award.

== Selected filmography ==
- Biometrics (2020)
- Nowhere Near (2020)
- No Data Plan (2019)
- Distancing (2019)
- Disintegration 93–96 (2017)
- Droga!/Drug! (2014)
