= The Wolves Always Come at Night =

2024 docufiction film

- International promotional poster
- Directed by: Gabrielle Brady
- Written by: Gabrielle Brady; Davaasuren Dagvasuren; Otgonzaya Dashzeveg
- Produced by: Julia Niethammer; Ariunaa Tserenpil; Rita Walsh
- Starring: Davaasuren Dagvasuren; Otgonzaya Dashzeveg
- Cinematography: Michael Latham
- Edited by: Katharina Fiedler
- Music by: Aaron Cupples
- Production companies: Chromosom Films; Guru Media; Over Here Productions; Storming Donkey Productions; WeirAnderson Films
- Distributed by: Cinephil; Madman Entertainment
- Release date: 8 September 2024 (TIFF)
- Running time: 95 minutes
- Countries: Australia; Germany; Mongolia
- Language: Mongolian

The Wolves Always Come at Night is a 2024 docudrama film co-written and directed by Gabrielle Brady. Its portrays the lives of Davaasuren Dagvasuren and Otgonzaya Dashzeveg, a Mongolian couple who are forced to abandon their familiar lives as shepherds and move to Ulaanbaatar after their livelihood is disrupted by climate change.

The film had its world premiere at the Platform section of the 2024 Toronto International Film Festival on 8 September, although Dagvasuren and Dashzeveg were unable to secure travel visas to attend the screening. It was also selected as the Australian entry for the Best International Feature Film at the 98th Academy Awards, but it was not nominated.

== Release ==
Brady first pitched the project at the Visions du Réel film festival in 2021. In advance of the premiere, it was acquired for commercial distribution by Cinephil.

The film premiered at the Platform Prize competition of the 2024 Toronto International Film Festival. It was subsequently screened in competition at the 2024 BFI London Film Festival. The film was screened at the CPH:DOX 2025 documentary film festival in PARA:FICTIONS section in March 2025.

== Critical response ==
For Point of View, Rachel Ho wrote that "The Wolves Always Come at Night is a slow burn by design — Brady maneuvers us quietly through the ebbs and flows of Daava and Zaya’s personal internal conflict so that we feel every detail and beat with depth rather than a passing superficiality. The universality of Daava and Zaya’s situation can be felt by families and communities around the world with less emphasis being placed on lifestyles connected to the land and earth and focus pushed on the commercialism of city life becoming increasingly common. It’s in the specificity and vulnerability of Daava and Zaya, and the willingness with which they allow audiences into their lives, that offers us the chance to take a 30,000 foot perspective and breaking us free from our own socio-economic bubbles."

Sabina Dana Plasse of Film Threat wrote that the film raises questions of the "mental instability of those directly subjected to climate change, what is happening in this world, and how we are all connected spiritually to nature. Watching a family uproot their lives and be displaced is difficult, even more so in a foreign land. However, the filmmakers made great efforts to seamlessly provide an emotional understanding of this remote place that relates to all viewers, no matter where one is from. One minor but clever element is the folk songs used throughout, which acutely reflect what is happening. Overall, this is a cinematic journey that unfolds leisurely yet engagingly and offers caution to what might be on the horizon."

== See also ==
- List of submissions to the 98th Academy Awards for Best International Feature Film
- List of Australian submissions for the Academy Award for Best International Feature Film
