= Phạm Ngọc Lan =

Vietnamese general and pilot (1934–2019)

- Born: December 12, 1934 Điện Nam, Điện Bàn District of Quảng Nam Province
- Died: June 14, 2019

Phạm Ngọc Lan (December 12, 1934 – June 14, 2019) was a general of the People's Army of Vietnam. He is known for being North Vietnam's first pilot to shoot down an American plane in aerial combat on April 3, 1965, though the American F-8 managed to land safely.

== Early life ==
Phạm was born on December 12, 1934, on a farm in Điện Nam, located in the Điện Bàn District of Quảng Nam Province. Less than a month after the August Revolution in 1945, the French reoccupied Vietnam's southern region and began operations to militarily contest the central coastal region.

== Early career ==
In December 1948, after persuading his family, Lan applied to work with the police in Đắk Lắk Province at the age of 14. Due to his young age, he was only assigned to cooking tasks and was later transferred to communication work. By January 1949, Lan was writing about security for the Resistance Administrative Committee of Đắk Lắk. In October of that year, he began clerical work for the Đắk Lắk Province teams.

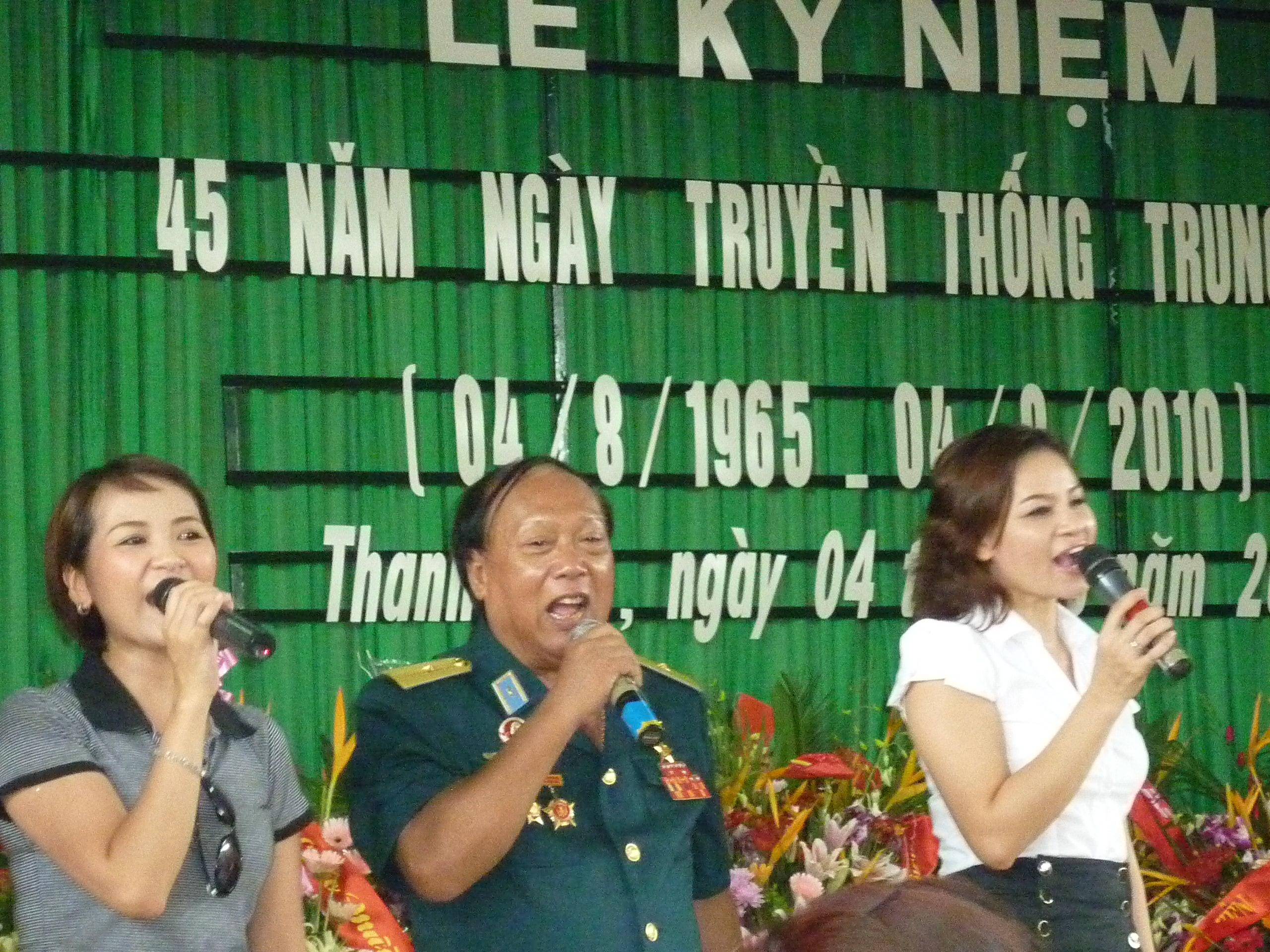
Pham Ngoc Lan was a General of The People's Army in Vietnam

He continually volunteered for combat but was turned down because of his small statute. In July 1952, at the age of 18, he was officially enlisted as a soldier with the clerical Political Committee Regiment 84 N'Trang Lơng, contact zone 5. From January 1953, he was a private soldier, vice squad leader, and squad leader of the University Team 602, Battalion 30, Regiment 96, and University Union 305.Beginning with his first battle, the Battle of An Khê Pass at the age of 19, until the 1954 armistice, Lan participated in 10 battles from Pleiku to Qui Nhơn and along Route 1 from Nha Trang to Quang Nam, capturing six prisoners, including a French soldier

Late in 1954, Lan was transferred to the North with his unit. In January 1955, he began further education at the School of Culture of the General Command in Kiến An, which aimed to train selected officers

His initial results were not satisfactory, but in only one year he quickly completed 10 years of education with excellent results.

In October 1956, Lan went to China to study at the School of the Air Force No. 3, Yungui Highlands, Yunnan with the rank of platoon leader. In training, Lan was always in the lead group and achieved the highest scores in all the eight subjects.

== Meeting American planes in aerial combat ==
On April 3, 1965, Lan participated in the first battle of Vietnam People's Air Force, where an attack aircraft of the U.S. Navy was ambushed in the region of the Thanh Hóa Bridge, a lifeline bridge that supplied military forces in the south.

== Training and command ==
After injuring his spine, Lan returned home when his superiors withdrew him from combat duty, and he was given the task of guiding and training young pilots and was promoted to lieutenant.

In April 1967, Lan was promoted to Regiment Captain and was appointed deputy of Air Force Regiment 921. In 1969, he was appointed Chairman of the Engineering Command of the Air Force. In January 1973, he was sent for further study at the Air Force Academy, Gagarin, in the Soviet Union. After returning home in March 1974, he was appointed Head of Work Staff Training Air Force Air Defense and Air Force, and promoted to major.

From 1975, he held the following positions:

- May 1977, Deputy Chief of Staff Air Force strains
- August 1977, studying at the Military Political Academy
- July 1978, Deputy Chief of Staff Air Force strains (2nd)
- August 1978, Deputy Division 371 Air Division
- April 1979, Division Chief Division 370 Air Force establishment
- July 1981, Chairman of the strains Air Force guidance
- November 1982, entitled Department Training School, Army Air Force strains
- December 1985, Director General of Military Training School Air Force strains
- June 1994, Deputy Director of Combat Training the General Staff

Lan was promoted to the rank of major general in June 1992.

== Retirement and death ==
Lan retired in August 1999 and returned to live in his own house at 192 Trường Chinh Street, Hanoi.

He died on June 14, 2019, aged 84 in Hanoi.

== Awards ==
- Third Military Medal
- Medal win (against France), First Class
- Medal-class struggle against the U.S.
- Achievement Medal (First Class, Second, Third)
- Soldiers Medal glorious (First Class, Second, Third)
- Military Medal winning public decisions
- A coat of arms of Uncle Ho (for pilots shot down American aircraft)
- Coat 40 year Party
- Hero of the People's Armed Forces
