= Island of the Hungry Ghosts =

- Film poster
- Directed by: Gabrielle Brady
- Written by: Gabrielle Brady
- Produced by: Alexander Wadouh; Samm Haillay; Alex Kelly; Gizem Acarla; Gabrielle Brady
- Starring: Poh Lin Lee
- Cinematography: Michael Latham
- Edited by: Katharina Fiedler
- Music by: Aaron Cupples
- Production company: Chromosom Film
- Distributed by: Autlook Filmsales
- Release date: April 19, 2018 (Tribeca Film Festival)
- Running time: 98 minutes
- Countries: Germany; Great Britain; Australia
- Language: English

Island of the Hungry Ghosts is a hybrid documentary film by director Gabrielle Brady that explores the conflict faced by trauma therapist Poh Lin Lee, who works in the Australian Detention Centre for Asylum Seekers on Christmas Island. It premiered at Tribeca Film Festival in 2018 where it won the Award for Best International Documentary. It was shown at festivals all over the world, winning several prizes. It was also released in cinemas in the United Kingdom, Australia, North America and Germany.

== Summary ==
Located off the coast of Indonesia, the Australian territory of Christmas Island is inhabited by migratory crabs travelling in their millions from the jungle towards the ocean, in a movement that has been provoked by the full moon for hundreds of thousands of years.

Poh Lin Lee is a “trauma therapist” who lives with her family in this seemingly idyllic paradise. Every day, she talks with the asylum seekers held indefinitely in a high-security detention centre hidden in the island’s core, attempting to support them in a situation that is as unbearable as its outcome is uncertain. As Poh Lin and her family explore the island’s beautiful yet threatening landscape, the local islanders carry out their “hungry ghost” rituals for the spirits of those who died on the island without a burial. They make offerings to appease the lost souls who are said to be wandering the jungles at night looking for home.

In the intimacy of her therapy sessions, as Poh Lin listens to the growing sense of despair of the people she counsels, she begins to feel the creeping dystopia reverberate through her own life.

Island of the Hungry Ghosts is a hybrid documentary that moves between the natural migration and the chaotic and tragic migration of the humans, which is in constant metamorphoses by the unseen decision-making structures.

== Accolades ==
Award	Category	Recipient	Result	Ref.
Tribeca Film Festival	Best Documentary Feature	Island of the Hungry Ghosts	Won	
Visions du Réel	Buyens-Chagoll Award	Island of the Hungry Ghosts	Won	
Independent Spirit Awards	Best Documentary Feature	Island of the Hungry Ghosts	Nominated	
IDFA	Amsterdam Human Rights Award	Island of the Hungry Ghosts	Won	
German film prize	Best Documentary	Island of the Hungry Ghosts	Pending	
Valletta Film Festival	Best Documentary film	Island of the Hungry Ghosts	Won	
Mumbai Film Festival	Grand Jury Prize for the International Competition	Island of the Hungry Ghosts	Won	
Edinburgh International Film Festival	Special Mention	Island of the Hungry Ghosts	Won	
Crested Butte Film Festival	Best Documentary	Island of the Hungry Ghosts	Won	
Adelaide Film Festival	Flinders University Feature Documentary Award	Island of the Hungry Ghosts	Won	
Darwin International Film Festival	Best Documentary	Island of the Hungry Ghosts	Won	
Human Rights Film Festival Zurich	Mercurius Prize	Island of the Hungry Ghosts	Won	
Festival des Libertés 2018	Prix SMART	Island of the Hungry Ghosts	Won	
SAE ATOM Awards 2018	Best Documentary	Island of the Hungry Ghosts	Won	
British Independent Film Awards	Best Music	Aaron Cupples	Nominated	
FIFO Tahiti 2019	Prix spécial du Jury	Island of the Hungry Ghosts	Won	
Ozflix Independent Film Awards	Best Film	Island of the Hungry Ghosts	Won	
Ozflix Independent Film Awards	Best Director	Gabrielle Brady	Won	
Ozflix Independent Film Awards	Best Cinematography	Michael Latham	Won	
Ozflix Independent Film Awards	Best Editing	Katharina Fiedler	Won	
Ozflix Independent Film Awards	Best Sound Design	Leo Dolgan	Won	
Ozflix Independent Film Awards	Best Original Soundtrack	Aaron Cupples	Nominated	
ZagrebDox 2019	Special Mention from the Movies That Matter Jury	Island of the Hungry Ghosts	Won	
Sole Luna Doc Film Festival 2019	Best Documentary	Island of the Hungry Ghosts	Won	
Sole Luna Doc Film Festival 2019	Audience Prize	Island of the Hungry Ghosts	Won	
Down Under Berlin FF	Best Film	Island of the Hungry Ghosts	Won	
Move it! Dresden 2019	Human Rights Award	Island of the Hungry Ghosts	Won	
Aubagne International Film Festival	Best Original Soundtrack	Aaron Cupples	Nominated	
