= Gabrielle Brady =

Australian documentary filmmaker

Gabrielle Brady (born 1984) is an Australian documentary filmmaker. She is most noted for her 2018 film Island of the Hungry Ghosts, which was an Independent Spirit Award nominee for Best Documentary Feature at the 35th Independent Spirit Awards in 2020.

She previously directed the short films Los pantalones rotos (2013), Static Miracles (2014) and The Island (2017) before releasing Island of the Hungry Ghosts as her feature debut.

Her second feature film, The Wolves Always Come at Night, premiered in the Platform Prize program at the 2024 Toronto International Film Festival, and was subsequently screened in competition at the 2024 BFI London Film Festival. She was nominated for a Cinema Eye Spotlight Award, German critics award and for the German documentary film prize.

The Australian/British filmmaker Brady is currently (2026) based in Berlin.
