= Dios Nunca Muere =

Waltz by Macedonio Alcalá

English: God Never Dies
- State anthem of Oaxaca
- Lyrics: Vicente Garrido Calderón, 1955
- Music: Macedonio Alcalá, 1868

Dios Nunca Muere (Instrumental)

"Dios Nunca Muere" (English: God Never Dies) is a Mexican waltz written by composer and violinist Macedonio Alcalá in 1868. It is the de facto anthem of the state of Oaxaca. "Dios Nunca Muere" has been sung by famous singers like Pedro Infante and Javier Solís.

There are two versions of the creation of this waltz. The first says that was composed when Macedonio Alcala and his wife went through a precarious economic situation and also the composer was at risk of dying, then his friend Roberto Maqueo, seeing their plight, left him without him noticing 12 pesos in silver. The other version says that some Indigenous people from a nearby village visited him to ask for a waltz for the patron of his people, and paid 12 pesos in silver. It is said that when Alcalá received the money, sat on his bed and drew on a wall the first bars of the waltz, which later transcribed on paper; He called this waltz Dios Nunca Muere in gratitude that he had received help when he needed.

To this composition has been assigned several lyrics from which the best known, was written in 1955 by Vicente Garrido Calderón.

== Lyrics ==
Coro
Muere el sol en los montes
Con la luz que agoniza,
Pues la vida en su prisa,
Nos conduce a morir.

Chorus
The sun dies in the mountains
With its light fading,
Because life in its haste,
Leads us to death.

Estrofa I
Pero que importa saber
que voy a tener el mismo final,
porque me queda el consuelo
Que Dios nunca morirá.

Stanza I
But it does not matter to know
That I will share the same fate,
Because I have the consolation
[of knowing] that God will never die.

Estrofa II
Voy a dejar las cosas que amé
La tierra ideal que me vio nacer,
sé que después habré de alcanzar,
La dicha y la paz, Que en Dios hallaré.

Stanza II
I will leave behind the things I loved
The ideal land of my birth,
I know that later I shall enjoy
The joy and peace, that in God I shall find.

Estrofa III
Sé que la vida empieza
En donde se piensa
Que la realidad termina
Sé que Dios nunca muere
Y que se conmueve
Del que busca su beatitud.

Stanza III
I know that life begins
Where it is thought
That reality ends
I know that God never dies
And He is moved
By him who seeks His bliss.

Estrofa IV
Sé que una nueva luz
Habrá de alcanzar nuestra soledad
Y que todo aquel que llega a morir
Empieza a vivir una eternidad.

Stanza IV
I know that a new light
Will reach our loneliness
And all those who happen to die
Begin to live forever.

Coro
Muere el sol en los montes
Con la luz que agoniza,
Pues la vida en su prisa,
Nos conduce a morir.

Chorus
The sun dies in the mountains
With its light fading,
Because life in its haste,
Leads us to death.

== See also ==
- Oaxaca
