= Juan Pablo González =

Mexican film director

- Born: August 13, 1984 (age 41); Altos de Jalisco, Mexico
- Education: Instituto Tecnológico y de Estudios Superiores de Monterrey (BA); University of Texas at Austin (MFA)
- Occupations: Film director; screenwriter; producer

Juan Pablo González (born August 13, 1984) is a Mexican film director, screenwriter and editor known for his 2018 film Caballerango, and the 2022 Sundance award winner Dos Estaciones. His work primarily focuses on the Los Altos region of Mexico, where he's from.

In 2015 González was named one of the "25 New Faces of Independent Film" by Filmmaker Magazine. The following year, his one-take short Las Nubes premiered at Havana and at the 2017 International Film Festival Rotterdam.

In 2018, his critically acclaimed mid-length documentary Caballerango premiered at the International Documentary Festival Amsterdam (IDFA).

He is currently on the faculty of the film directing program at the California Institute of the Arts (CalArts). In 2020 he won the Vilcek Prize for Creative Promise in Filmmaking.
