= The Artist & The Pervert =

2018 BDSM film

- Directed by: Beatrice Behn; René Gebhardt
- Starring: Georg Friedrich Haas; Mollena Williams-Haas
- Release date: 2018
- Country: Germany

The Artist & The Pervert is a 2018 German documentary film by directors Beatrice Behn and René Gebhardt. It focuses on the BDSM relationship between married couple Georg Friedrich Haas and Mollena Williams-Haas. Presented without narration or commentary, the film intersperses talking heads footage of the couple with archival material. The documentary has been studied by researchers examining gender and composition, traumatophilia, and race and BDSM.

== Background ==
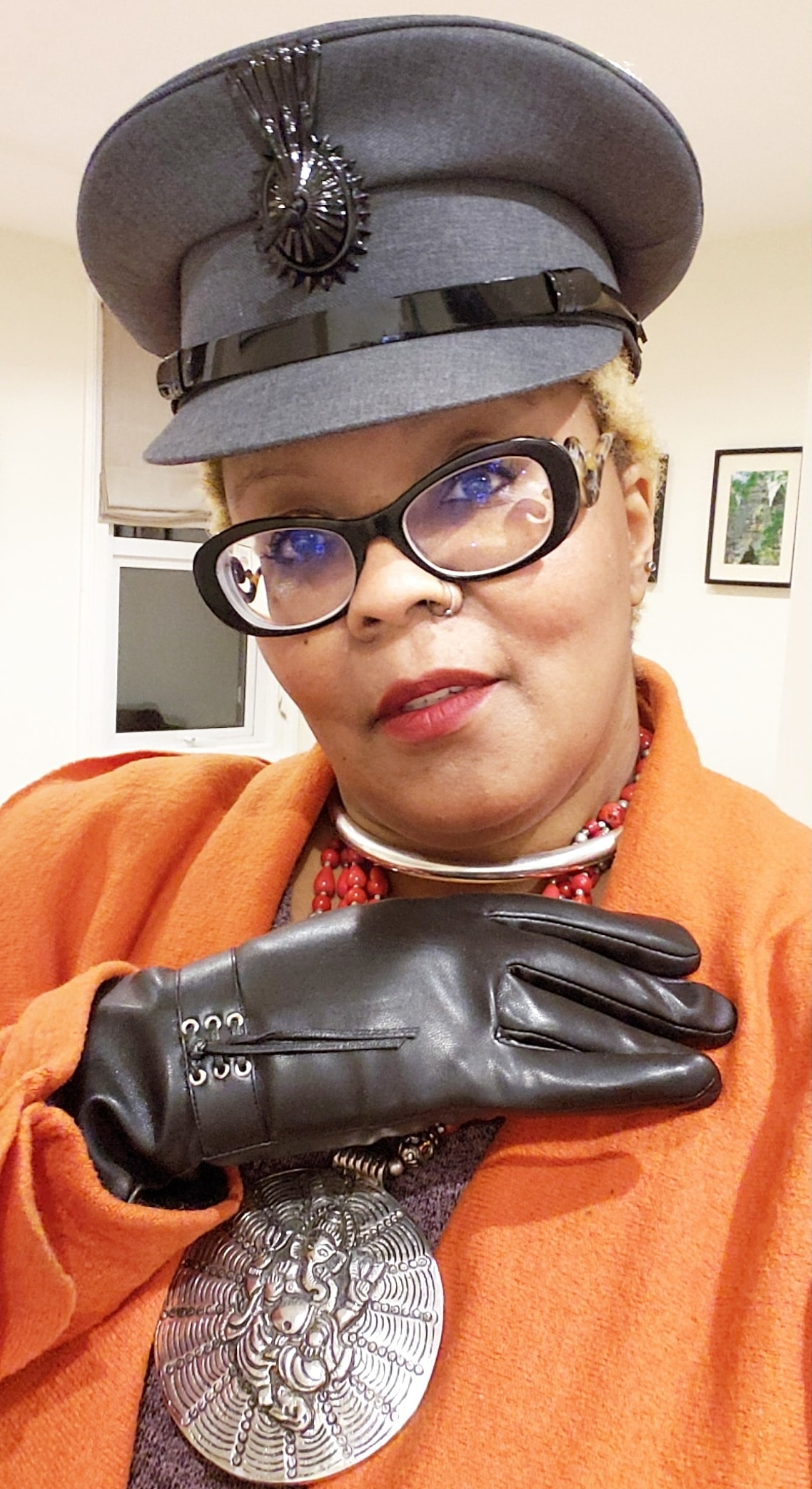
Mollena Williams-Haas

The documentary centres on the BDSM relationship between married couple Georg Friedrich Haas and Mollena Williams-Haas. The couple, who met in 2013 and married in 2015, have a relationship based on race play, where Georg Friedrich Haas is the dominant partner. Directors Behn and Gebhardt first found out about the couple due to an interview they gave with The New York Times about their relationship. Williams-Haas is an African-American sex educator; Haas is an Austrian composer, whose family were Nazis. During the process of filming the documentary, Donald Trump was elected president, and the couple also began work on a piece based on Williams-Haas' alcoholism. Post-production for the film was crowd-funded.

== Synopsis ==
Directed by Beatrice Behn and René Gebhardt, and presented without narration or commentary, the film follows the BDSM relationship between Haas and Williams-Haas. The film intersperses talking heads footage of the couple with archival material. In parallel the film discusses some of Haas' work—in particular In Vain—an opus for 24 instruments that he wrote in response to the rise of the far right in Austria. Footage in the documentary also includes nudity, spanking and other BDSM activities.

== Analysis ==
The documentary has been studied as part of analysis of gender and composition by Christa Brüstle, who cited Haas' connection he makes in it between his sadism and creativity in her research, as does Rosa Fernández. The film has also been studied by Avgi Saketopoulou, who uses it as an example that illustrates how traumatophilia offers those with trauma "a vital and often pleasurable life that goes beyond the prospects of 'trauma culture' in which victimhood is the focus". In 2020 Ariane Cruz cited the documentary as one of three that was marking a juncture in the academic study of race and BDSM. The other works cited by Cruz were: Kinky directed by Jean Claude La Marre and released in 2018; Jeremy O Harris' piece Black Exhibition (2019); Slave Play written by Harris and directed by Robert O'Hara.

== Awards and recognition ==
- Best Documentary (nominee) – Raindance Film Festival, 2018
- Selected as the opening film at Porn Film Festival Vienna, 2019
