= Black Exhibition =

2019 choreopoem by Jeremy O. Harris

- Original language: English
- Written by: Jeremy O. Harris
- Subject: African-American queerness
- Genre: Choreopoem

Premiere
- Date: November 2019
- Place: The Bushwick Starr
- Directed by: Machal Ross

Black Exhibition is a 2019 choreopoem by writer and actor Jeremy O. Harris. Directed by Machel Ross, Harris was also a central performer in the work which premiered at The Bushwick Starr in New York (US) in November 2019. Harris also organised a queer out night, where all the audience members were also part of queer communities, inspired by black out performances in theatre. The New Yorker described the show as "sad and scatological, an intellectual collage and an essayistic provocation". For its portrayal of race and BDSM it has been compared to the films Kinky and The Artist & The Pervert, and Harris's preceding theatrical work Slave Play.

== Background ==
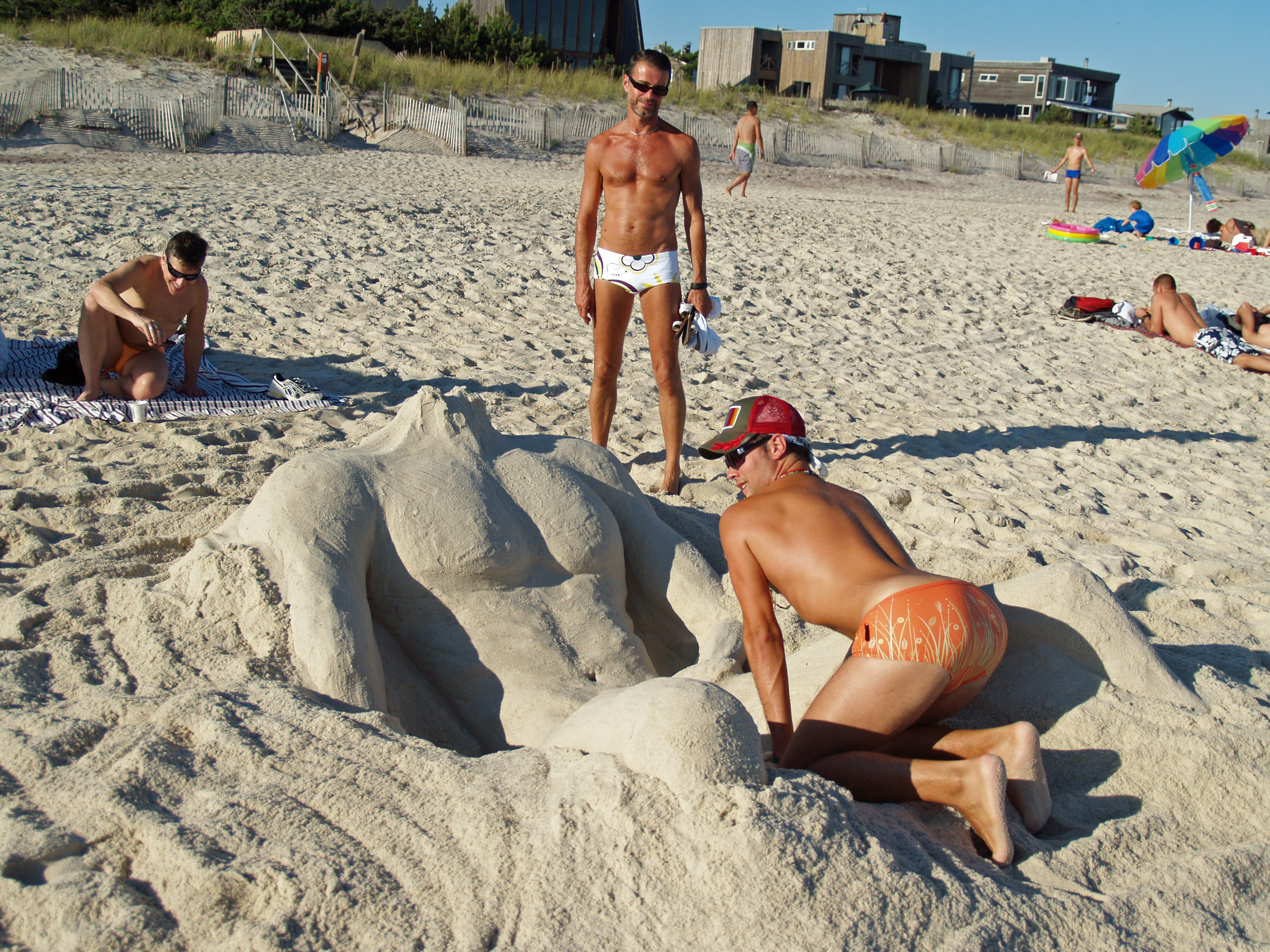
Sand sculpture on a Fire Island beach (2008)

Developed partly in Berlin and partly on Fire Island, Harris used the term choreopoem to refer to the work and compared it to Ntozake Shange's book for colored girls who have considered suicide / when the rainbow is enuf. Harris has described Black Exhibition as his EP, whereas his preceding work Slave Play was to him an LP.

== Synopsis ==
The work is set on Fire Island and features a range of LGBTQ+ themes including poppers, group sex, and sexual rejection. A parallel theme is writer's block. It features a range of characters inspired by queer figures, including Gary Fisher, Michael Johnson, Kathy Acker, Yukio Mishima, and Samuel Delany. Harris played Fisher, reading from his published works, with the four other figures as muses or advisors to the character. Cultural references in the work make reference to social media culture on Twitter in the early 2010s, as well as the "Twitter gay" trope. The piece uses physical comedy and humour alongside serious dialogue, free verse, choral speaking, dance, and tableaux vivants.

== Reception ==
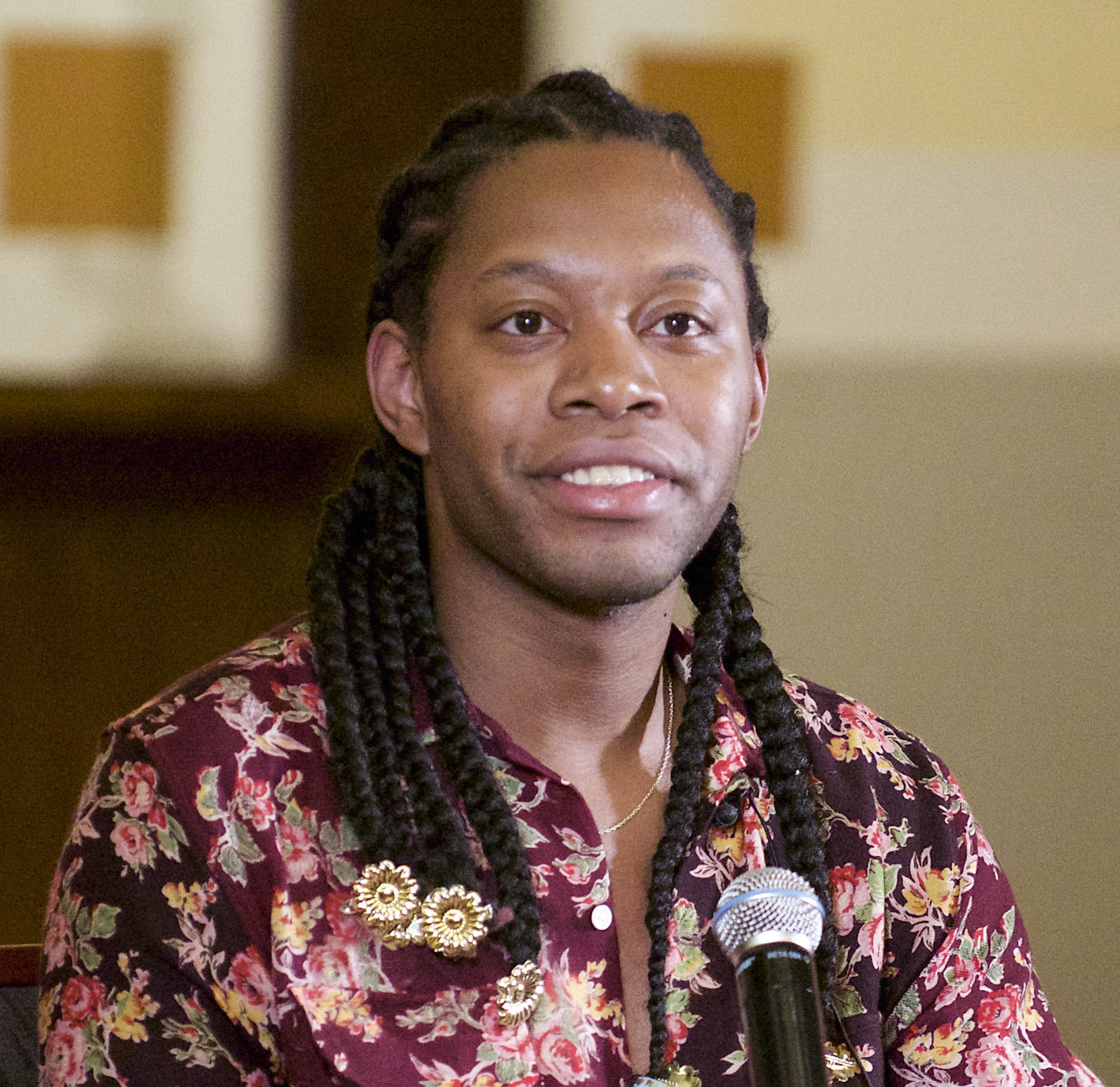
Jeremy O. Harris (2020)

Directed by Machel Ross, and written under the pseudonym GaryXXXFisher by Jeremy O. Harris, the work premiered at The Bushwick Starr in New York. The secrecy surrounding the work and his pseudonym was inspired by surprise album drops, from artists such as Beyoncé. Cast members included Ross Days, Miles Greenberg, AJ Harris and Dhari Noel. Early in its run, Harris organised a queer out night, where all the audience members were also part of queer communities, inspired by black out performances in theatre. An initial run from 6 to 23 November 2019 was extended until mid-December that year. It was reviewed by Mikelle Street who described how "the viewer can go from laughter to disgust and even concern in the space of a minute as they watch what feels like an exorcism on stage". The New Yorker described the show as "sad and scatological, an intellectual collage and an essayistic provocation". Time Out described it as an examination of "artistic self-exposure".

== Analysis ==
The work has been studied in relation to nudity in North American performance, as well as race and BDSM. In the latter study, Ariane Cruz cited the Black Exhibition as a key work in the academic study of race and BDSM. The other works cited and compared by Cruz were: Kinky directed by Jean Claude La Marre and released in 2018; Slave Play written by Harris and directed by Robert O'Hara; The Artist & The Pervert featuring the marriage of composer Georg Friedrich Haas and sex educator Mollena Williams-Haas.
