= Antoinette Crowe-Legacy =

American actress

- Born: Texas, United States
- Education: Southern Methodist University (BFA); Yale School of Drama (MFA)
- Occupation: Actress

Antoinette Crowe-Legacy is an American actress best known for her role as Elise Johnson, the daughter of Bumpy Johnson, in the Epix series Godfather of Harlem.

== Early life and education ==
Crowe-Legacy was raised in Garland, Texas and attended Booker T. Washington High School for the Performing and Visual Arts. In 2010, she was a finalist for a National YoungArts Foundation award.

Crowe-Legacy attended Southern Methodist University, performing in a 2013 production of The Odd Couple at the Dallas Theater Center. In 2018, she graduated from the Yale School of Drama, where she received the Carol Finch Dye Award.

== Career ==
While at Yale, Crowe-Legacy appeared in productions of Three Sisters, Seven Guitars, and Our Lady of 121st Street. She performed in the Playwrights Horizons premiere of If Pretty Hurts Ugly Must Be a Muhfucka by Tori Sampson and the Off-Broadway premiere of BLKS by Aziza Barnes in 2019. That year, she made her screen debut as Elise Johnson, the daughter of Bumpy Johnson as played by Forest Whitaker, in Godfather of Harlem on Epix.

In 2021, Crowe-Legacy featured in Passing, a film adaptation of the Nella Larsen novel of the same name directed by Rebecca Hall. She also served as the replacement for the role of Kaneisha in that year's Broadway production of Slave Play, a role she had originated during the initial 2017 reading of the play as she attended Yale alongside playwright Jeremy O. Harris.

Crowe-Legacy appeared in two episodes of the 2022 Apple TV+ series WeCrashed as Leslie, a WeWork employee. She performed in the original cast of another Tori Sampson play, This Land Was Made, at the Vineyard Theatre in 2023. That fall, she portrayed Hermione in a production of Shakespeare's The Winter's Tale at the Folger Theatre in Washington, DC.

== Filmography ==
=== Film ===
Year	Title	Role	Ref.
2021	Passing	Felise	

=== Television ===
Year	Title	Role	Notes	Ref.
2019–2025	Godfather of Harlem	Elise Johnson	Main Role	
2022	WeCrashed	Leslie	2 episodes	
2022	Line of Fire	Nia Wallace	recurring role	

== Theatre ==
Year	Production	Role	Venue	Notes	Ref.
2013	The Odd Couple	Cecily Pigeon	Dallas Theater Center	Credited as Antoinette Crowe	
2019	If Pretty Hurts Ugly Must Be a Muhfucka	Massassi	Playwrights Horizons	—N/a	
2019	BLKS	June	Newman Mills Theater	—N/a	
2021	Slave Play	Kaneisha	August Wilson Theatre	Originated the role during the play's 2017 reading at Yale	
2023	This Land Was Made	Sassy	Vineyard Theatre	—N/a	
2023	The Winter's Tale	Hermione	Folger Theatre	—N/a	
