= Isabella Summers =

English musician, songwriter, and music producer (born 1980)

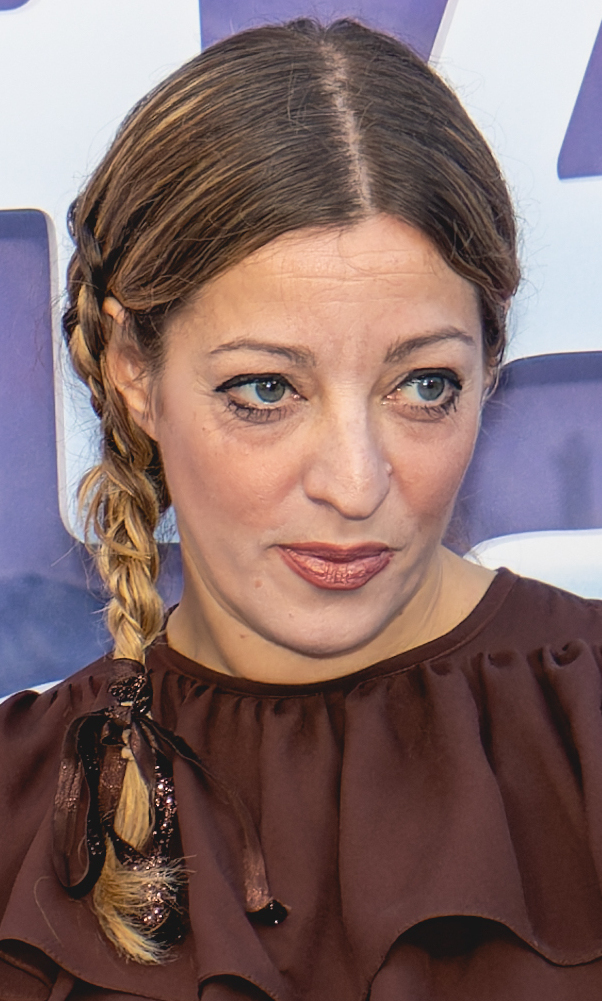
- Summers at the 2024 BFI London Film Festival premiere of That Christmas

Background information
- Also known as: Isa Machine
- Born: Isabella Janet Florentina Summers; 31 October 1980 (age 45); Hackney, England
- Education: Woodbridge School; Central Saint Martins
- Genres: Indie rock; indie pop; art rock; alternative rock; electronica; experimental; new-age; film score
- Occupations: Musician; songwriter; producer; composer; remixer
- Instruments: Piano; keyboards; synthesizer; guitar
- Years active: 2008–present
- Label: Universal Publishing
- Member of: Florence + the Machine

Isabella Janet Florentina Summers (born 31 October 1980) is an English songwriter, musician, and music producer. She is a founding member of the indie rock band Florence and the Machine, whose name was partly inspired by her nickname "Isa Machine". Summers produced and co-wrote several tracks on the band's early albums, including the singles "Dog Days Are Over" and "Cosmic Love". In 2020, she received a Primetime Emmy Award nomination for her score for the Hulu mini series Little Fires Everywhere. Her recent work includes the score for the 2026 film The Magic Faraway Tree.

== Early life ==
Summers lived her first nine years in Hackney, London. When Summers was ten, her family moved to Aldeburgh, Suffolk. There Summers attended Woodbridge School, had piano lessons and grew an interest in music, crediting some influence from mixtapes made by her father with "a very eclectic mixture of everything and anything from Beethoven to Bob Dylan, rarities, poetry, even the Shipping forecast". Hip-hop was a preferred genre, as her neighbours gave her a tape with Snoop Dogg's Doggystyle (1993) and 6 Feet Deep (1994) by Gravediggaz; she would also spend evenings with fishermen's sons "who smoked loads of weed and listened to hard American rap."

== Career ==
Summers moved to East Dulwich, back in London, where she would get a fine arts degree at Central Saint Martins. While there, she bought a set of DJ mixers to learn how to mix, while also doing side jobs such as being a courier for Top of the Pops and transcriptions and film digitizing for Alan Parker. Soon she was working with Dan Greenpeace on his 'All City Show' radio show on XFM London, an experience that led Summers to buy her first MPC which was installed at the cupboard of her shared flat. With the help of a friend she started a studio in a former plastics factory at Crystal Palace, and began making hip hop. During this time, Summers worked with, amongst others, Kashmere, The Iguana Man, IRS Crew, MBC Crew, Inja and The Last Skeptik. She met Florence Welch through art school and DJ work, as Welch was attending the Camberwell College of Arts.

As Summers was hired to remix songs by the band Ludes, Welch became a more common sight at her studio given she was dating Ludes' guitarist Matt Alchin, and even impressed Summers with her singing. One day, as Summers got into a creative rut, which she described as getting "sick of boys telling me what to do", she thought of writing pop music with a woman, and invited Welch to make songs with her. Following a day joining Summers' beats with Welch's lyrics, they began writing demos together, which were produced by Summers by banging on the walls to make drum sounds and using the string sounds from her keyboard. It was also during this period that Summers saw a man on the street carrying a "coffin shaped box" and asked him what it was, it turned out to be Tom Monger carrying his harp, Summers suggested that he play on the demos that became "Dog Days Are Over" and "Between Two Lungs". This led to their performing together for a time under the name Florence Robot/Isa Machine, the project was renamed Florence and the Machine. Summers had only thought of being a producer and songwriter on the project but ended up also as the group's keyboardist, with her second gig being the 2007 Glastonbury Festival. Summers has co-written and produced on Florence and the Machine's first three albums Lungs (2009), Ceremonials (2011) and How Big, How Blue, How Beautiful (2015). As of June 2016, "Dog Days Are Over" has had over 3,151,000 downloads in the United States alone. The song was used in Marvel's 2023 movie Guardians of the Galaxy Vol 3. It was also referenced on Drake's track "Rich Baby Daddy" featuring SZA and Sexyy Red from his 2023 album For All The Dogs.

Summers has also written, produced and remixed tracks for artists including Beyoncé, Juliette Lewis, Jennifer Hudson, Jasmine Thompson, Cara Delevingne, Chloe x Halle, Flux Pavilion, Rita Ora, Judith Hill, LP and The Game.

Summers had created the main title song "Was It Love" for the Sky Atlantic series Riviera, and provided her friend Sam Levinson the song "Rage" for his film Assassination Nation (2018), when right after finishing the High as Hope Tour, that film's music supervisor Mary Ramos invited Summers for her first composing gig in a team-up with Mark Isham, scoring the Hulu miniseries Little Fires Everywhere, which won her a Primetime Emmy Award nomination. Summers followed it by composing the score for the Prime Video series Panic alongside Brian H. Kim, Summers co-wrote the Tate McRae song "The Darkest Hour" as featured in the show. Netflix's Sex/Life followed next in another collaboration with Isham. Her first solo composing gig was the Apple TV show Physical, whose 1980s setting led to a score full of "crazy synths and over-the-top guitar solos". Afterwards Summers scored her first movie, Call Jane (2022), and the Paramount+ show The Offer.

Summers was invited by the Cy Twombly Foundation in conjuncture with Gagosian Gallery to interpret Cy Twombly's sculptures into music for their 2019 London exhibition 'Cy Twombly Sculpture', the piece titled 'To Neptune, Ruler of the Seas Profound' was interwoven with quotations from poems and literary texts by authors who have served as muses or subjects for Twombly, including Homer, Stéphane Mallarmé, and William Butler Yeats. The performance expands on a composition Summers performed in Rome in May 2022 at the Fondazione Nicola Del Roscio. Furthermore Summers performed it a third time at the Gagosian Gallery in Beverly Hills in 2022 to a sold out audience.

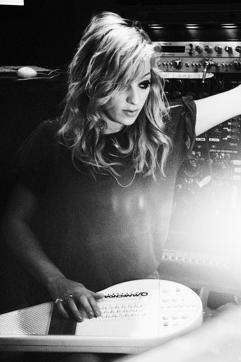
Summers in studio in 2011

In 2022, Summers scored Sony's 3000 Pictures and Netflix film Lady Chatterly's Lover, directed by Laure de Clermont-Tonnerre and starring Emma Corrin and Jack O'Connell. In 2023, Summers scored the Apple TV+ adult animation series Strange Planet by Dan Harmon and Nathan W. Pyle, released on August 9, 2023. Following this she also scored the third and final season of Physical for Apple TV+ released on August 2, 2023. In 2023, Summers scored the soundtrack for the Focus Features film Lisa Frankenstein, directed by Zelda Williams and released in February 2024. She also scored the film Breathe, directed by Stefon Bristol and starring Jennifer Hudson, which was released in April 2024. In June of 2024, Summers made her documentary scoring debut on the feature Slave Play. Not a Movie. A Play. The film was directed by Jeremy O. Harris and follows the playwright as he deconstructs his Tony-nominated play Slave Play. Summers wrote the original score for the Netflix show Kaos released in August 2024 and the animated comedy Hitpig! released in November 2024.

In the summer of 2024, Isabella Summers performed at The National Gallery in collaboration with Pipeline. Summers responded in music and spoken word to two paintings by Caravaggio 'The Martyrdom of Saint Ursula' and 'Salome and the Head of John The Baptist'. The paintings made up the exhibition 'The Last Caravaggio', held at The National Gallery.

In Autumn 2024, Summers wrote the music for the soundtrack to the Vivienne Westwood Tunis Fashion Week 2024 show. Further work with the designer includes the Andreas Kronthaler for Vivienne Westwood AW25/26 runway show and the Vivienne Westwood Spring-Summer 2026 Milan Menswear Presentation.

In 2025, she composed the score for the Netflix Rom-Com My Oxford Year, the movie version of the acclaimed novel written by Julia Whelan. She also composed the score for two films directed by American film maker Pete Ohs, The True Beauty of Being Bitten by a Tick and Erupcja, the forthcoming film starring Charli XCX. Summers composed the music for the horror/thriller film Dust Bunny. The film was directed by Bryan Fuller and premiered at the 2025 Toronto International Film Festival.

In 2026, Summers released her debut solo album Villain and contributed additional music production to Emerald Fennel's adaptation of Wuthering Heights. She also scored the movie adaptation of Enid Blytons The Magic Faraway Tree.

== Discography ==
=== Selected songwriting and production credits ===
Year	Artist	Album	Track(s)	Role
2009	Florence and the Machine	Lungs	"Dog Days Are Over", "Cosmic Love", "Falling", "Hurricane Drunk", "Blinding"	Producer, writer
2011	Florence and the Machine	Ceremonials	"No Light, No Light", "All This and Heaven Too", "Breath of Life"	Producer, writer
2011	Beyoncé	4	"Countdown" (Remix)	Producer, writer
2012	Dia Frampton	Red	"Bullseye"	Producer, writer
2014	LP	Forever For Now	"Someday", "Forever For Now", "Road to Ruin"	Producer, writer
2014	Iggy Azalea	Reclassified	"Trouble" (feat. Jennifer Hudson)	Writer
2015	Florence and the Machine	How Big, How Blue, How Beautiful	"How Big, How Blue, How Beautiful", "Delilah", "Which Witch"	Writer
2015	Beyoncé	B6	"Dreams"	Producer, writer
2021	LP	Churches	"Can't Let You Leave"	Writer
2023	Drake	For All the Dogs	"Rich Baby Daddy" (feat. Sexyy Red and SZA)	Writer (sample)

=== Television ===
Year	Title	Network	Role	Notes
2020	Little Fires Everywhere	Hulu	Composer	Nominated – Primetime Emmy Award for Outstanding Original Music and Lyrics
2021	Panic	Amazon Prime	Composer	
2021	Sex/Life	Netflix	Composer	
2021	Physical	Apple TV+	Composer	Seasons 1–3
2022	The Offer	Paramount+	Composer	Limited series
2022	Devil in Ohio	Netflix	Composer	Theme and original songs
2024	KAOS	Netflix	Composer	
2026	Ride or Die	Amazon Prime	Composer	
2026	Lucky	Apple TV+	Composer	

=== Film ===
Year	Title	Role	Notes
2018	Assassination Nation	Composer	Additional music
2018	Beach Rats	Composer	Additional music
2022	Call Jane	Composer	Directed by Phyllis Nagy
2022	Lady Chatterley's Lover	Composer	Netflix Original
2022	Aristotle and Dante Discover the Secrets of the Universe	Composer	
2024	Lisa Frankenstein	Composer	Directed by Zelda Williams
2024	Breathe	Composer	Directed by Stefon Bristol
2024	Hitpig!	Composer	Animated feature
2024	Slave Play. Not a Movie. A Play.	Composer	Documentary film
2025	Dust Bunny	Composer	Directed by Bryan Fuller
2025	My Oxford Year	Composer	Netflix Original
2025	The True Beauty of Being Bitten by a Tick	Composer	Short film; directed by Pete Ohs
2026	Erupcja	Composer	Co-composed with Charles Watson; directed by Pete Ohs
2026	The Magic Faraway Tree	Composer	Based on the Enid Blyton series
2026	Wuthering Heights	Additional Music Production	Directed by Emerald Fennell
