= Barbagallo =

Barbagallo is a surname. Notable people with the surname include:

- Alf Barbagallo (born 1942), Australian racing car driver and businessman
- Jess Barbagallo, American playwright and performer

== See also ==
- 93061 Barbagallo, a main-belt asteroid
- Barbagallo Raceway, a motorsport circuit located in Neerabup, Western Australia
