= Pete Ohs =

American filmmaker

- Ohs in 2025
- Born: Ohio, U.S.
- Occupations: Director, screenwriter, editor, cinematographer
- Years active: 2005–present
- Notable work: Erupcja, The True Beauty of Being Bitten by a Tick, Everything Beautiful Is Far Away
- Spouse: Andrea Sisson (m. 2010; div. 2021)

Pete Ohs is an American filmmaker. He is known for writing and directing the feature films Everything Beautiful Is Far Away (2017), Love And Work (2024), The True Beauty of Being Bitten by a Tick (2025), and Erupcja (2025). His other feature films include Youngstown (2021) and Jethica (2022). Ohs has also directed the short film Nothing Bad Will Happen starring Dasha Nekrasova, and he has directed music videos for Best Coast, Wavves, Slow Club, and The Fiery Furnaces.

== Early life ==
Ohs was born and raised in Ohio.

== Career ==
Ohs directed the No Hope Kids music video for Wavves which was included in Pitchfork's Top Music Videos of 2009 and the When I'm With You music video for Best Coast which was included in Pitchfork's Top Music Videos of 2010 as well as NME's Top 50 Videos of the Year.

In 2012, the hybrid-documentary feature I Send You This Place premiered at the Full Frame Documentary Film Festival. The film was co-directed with contemporary artist Andrea Sisson. He was named one of Filmmaker Magazine's "25 New Faces of Independent Film" for 2013.

In 2013, his screenplay for Everything Beautiful Is Far Away was selected for IFP's Emerging Storytellers program. In 2017, Everything Beautiful Is Far Away had its world premiere at the Los Angeles Film Festival and received the U.S. Fiction Cinematography Award. The film stars Julia Garner and Joseph Cross, with an original score by Alan Palomo.

In 2018, Ohs directed the short film Nothing Bad Will Happen starring Dasha Nekrasova. In 2022, Ohs produced and directed the feature film Jethica on a $10,000 budget starring Callie Hernandez and Will Madden. The film premiered at the 2022 SXSW Film Festival. In 2024, Ohs produced and directed the feature film Love And Work starring Stephanie Hunt, Will Madden, Frank Mosley, Alexi Pappas and John S. Davies. The film premiered at the 2024 Slamdance Film Festival.

In 2025, Ohs directed two feature films: The True Beauty of Being Bitten by a Tick and Erupcja. The True Beauty of Being Bitten by a Tick stars Zoë Chao, Callie Hernandez, James Cusati-Moyer and Jeremy O. Harris, and it had its world premiere at South by Southwest on March 7, 2025. Erupcja stars Charli XCX, Lena Góra, Will Madden, and Harris again, with all of the actors also working on the script alongside Ohs; the film had its world premiere at the TIFF in the Centrepiece section on September 4, 2025. That year, he also served as co-writer, cinematographer, and co-editor of OBEX, which had its world premiere at the 2025 Sundance Film Festival on January 25, 2025.

== Filmography ==
=== Film ===
Year	Title	Notes	Ref.
2012	I Send You This Place	Documentary film	
2014	The Vision Quest™	Short film	
2017	Everything Beautiful Is Far Away		
2018	Nothing Bad Will Happen	Short film	
2021	Youngstown		
2022	Jethica		
2024	Love And Work		
2025	OBEX	Cinematographer, co-writer and co-editor	
2025	The True Beauty of Being Bitten by a Tick		
2025	Erupcja	Co-written with the main cast	

=== Music videos ===
Year	Song	Artist	Ref.
2005	"I Was Born (A Unicorn)"	The Unicorns	
2007	"Parking Lot Nights"	Ghosthustler	
2008	"Duplexes of the Dead"	The Fiery Furnaces	
2009	"No Hope Kids"	Wavves	
2009	"Trophy Room"	Slow Club	
2010	"When I'm With You"	Best Coast	
2019	"Venice"	Magdalena Bay	

== Works cited ==
- Lei, Alex (2025). "Open House". Filmmaker. Vol. 33, no. 4. The Gotham Film & Media Institute.
