= Invention (film) =

2024 American drama film

- Official poster
- Directed by: Courtney Stephens
- Screenplay by: Courtney Stephens; Callie Hernandez
- Produced by: Courtney Stephens; Callie Hernandez
- Starring: Callie Hernandez; Sahm McGlynn; Lucy Kaminsky; Tony Torn; James N. Kienitz Wilkins; Joe Swanberg; Caveh Zahedi
- Cinematography: Rafael Palacio Illingworth
- Edited by: Dounia Sichov; Courtney Stephens
- Music by: Twig Harper; Sarah Davachi; Cate Kennan; Thomas E. Dimock
- Production companies: Neurotika Haus; Jacket Weather
- Release dates: August 11, 2024 (Locarno); April 18, 2025
- Running time: 72 minutes
- Country: United States
- Language: English

Invention is a 2024 American drama film, directed and produced by Courtney Stephens, from a screenplay by Stephens and Callie Hernandez. It stars Hernandez, Sahm McGlynn, Lucy Kaminsky, Tony Torn, James N. Kienitz Wilkins, Joe Swanberg and Caveh Zahedi.

It had its world premiere at the 77th Locarno Film Festival on August 11, 2024, and was released on April 18, 2025.

== Premise ==
Following the unexpected death of a conspiracy-brained father, his daughter gains access to his patent for an experimental healing device.

== Cast ==
- Callie Hernandez as Carrie Fernandez
- Sahm McGlynn as Sahm
- Lucy Kaminsky as Babby
- Tony Torn as Tony
- James N. Kienitz Wilkins as The Executor
- Joe Swanberg as John
- Caveh Zahedi as Henri

== Release ==
It had its world premiere at the 77th Locarno Film Festival on August 11, 2024, where Hernandez won the Pardo for Best Performance in the Present section. Los Angeles Festival of Movies hosted a screening on April 4, 2025 and New Directors/New Films Festival on April 5, 2025. It is scheduled to be released on April 18, 2025. MUBI holds current streaming rights to the film, which began streaming it on July 4, 2025.

== Reception ==
On the review aggregator website Rotten Tomatoes, 95% of 19 critics' reviews are positive. Metacritic, which uses a weighted average, assigned the film a score of 67 out of 100, based on 5 critics, indicating "generally favorable" reviews.

Josh Slater-Williams of IndieWire gave the film a B+ writing: "A playful and perceptive film that does achieve its own sort of magic in seeing just how far you can test the boundaries between metafiction and explicit documentary."
