= The Misconceived =

- Directed by: James N. Kienitz Wilkins
- Written by: James N. Kienitz Wilkins; Robin Schavoir
- Produced by: James N. Kienitz Wilkins; Emily Davis; Joey Frank
- Starring: Jesse Wakeman; Jess Barbagallo; John Magary; Callie Hernandez
- Production company: Automatic Moving
- Release date: January 31, 2026 (IFFR)
- Running time: 89 minutes
- Country: United States
- Language: English

The Misconceived is a 2026 American 3D animated black comedy film written, produced, and directed by James N. Kienitz Wilkins.

It premiered at the International Film Festival Rotterdam on January 31, 2026.

== Premise ==
A failed filmmaker turned single dad tries to make a living while retaining his sense of self.

== Voice cast ==
- Jesse Wakeman
- Jess Barbagallo
- John Magary
- Callie Hernandez

== Production ==
In July 2024, James N. Kienitz Wilkins revealed that he was working on a 3D animated absurdist black comedy film titled The Misconceived. The main voice cast included: Jesse Wakeman, Jess Barbagallo, John Magary, and Callie Hernandez. In January 2026, Visit Films acquired the international sales rights.

== Release ==
The Misconceived premiered at the International Film Festival Rotterdam on January 31, 2026.
