= Circle Jerk (play) =

2020 play by Michael Breslin and Patrick Foley

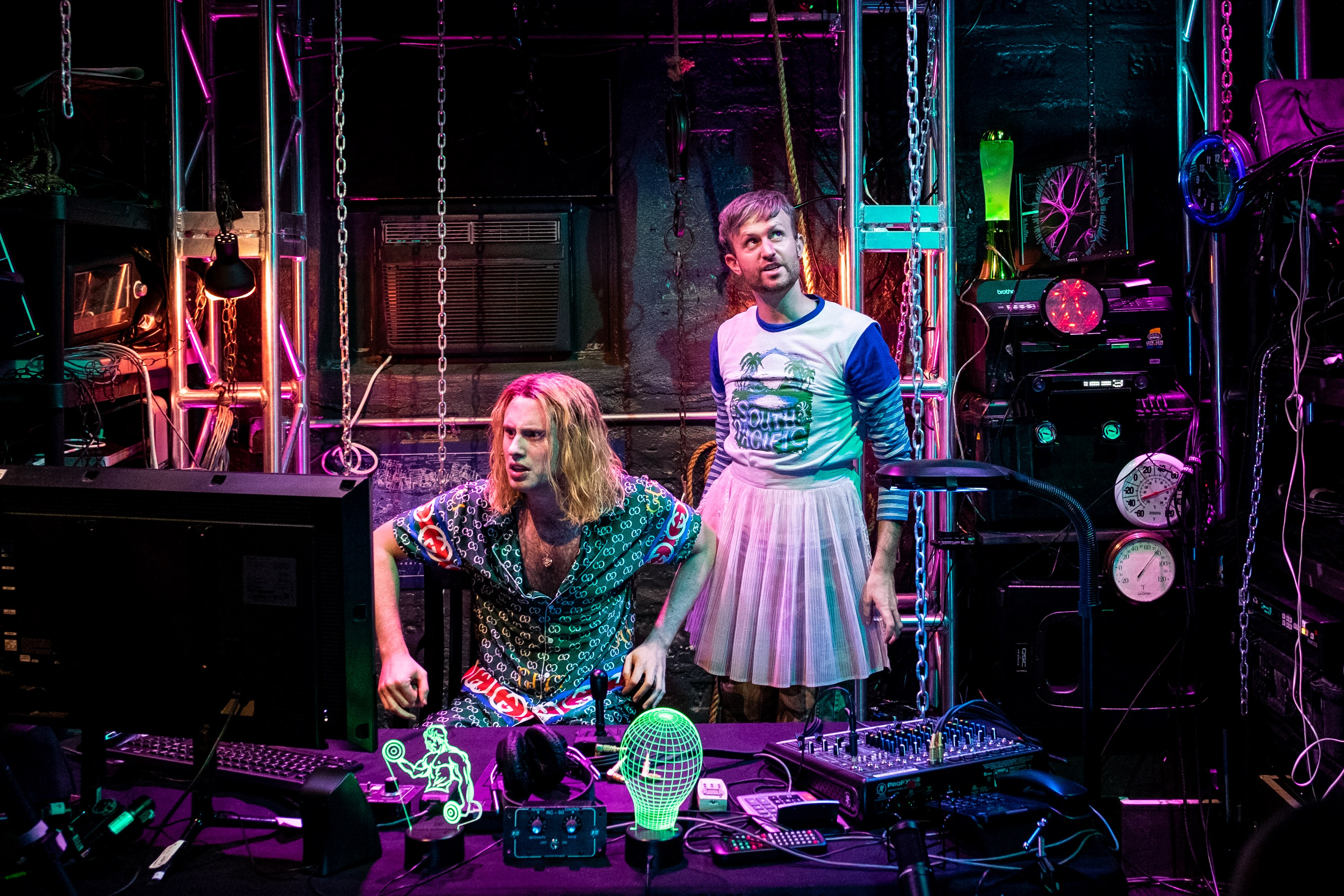

Circle Jerk is a 2020 American multimedia play by Michael Breslin and Patrick Foley. The play was originally produced by Fake Friends Theater and Media Company, Caroline Gart, and Jeremy O. Harris. It was directed by Rory Pelsue. It featured dramaturgy by Ariel Sibert and performances from the authors and Catherine María Rodríguez.

== Summary ==
It's winter on Gaymen Island, a summer retreat for the homosexual rich and famous. This off-season, two White gay internet trolls hatch a plot to take back what's wrongfully theirs. Cancelations, meme schemes, and political and erotica flip flops abound as three actors playing nine parts, play out this chaotic live-streamed descent into the high-energy, quick-change, low-brow pit of the internet.

== Accolades ==
It was a finalist for the 2021 Pulitzer Prize for Drama. It won a Special Citation at the 2023 Obie Awards.

== See also ==
- Internet culture
- Alt-right
- Doomscrolling
