= The True Beauty of Being Bitten by a Tick =

2025 American comedy-drama film

- Directed by: Pete Ohs
- Produced by: Pete Ohs; Callie Hernandez; Jeremy O. Harris; Josh Godfrey
- Starring: Zoë Chao; Callie Hernandez; James Cusati-Moyer; Jeremy O. Harris
- Cinematography: Pete Ohs
- Edited by: Pete Ohs
- Music by: Isabella Summers
- Production companies: Spartan Media Acquisitions; bb²; Neurotika Haus
- Release date: March 7, 2025 (SXSW)
- Running time: 80 minutes
- Country: United States
- Language: English

The True Beauty of Being Bitten by a Tick is a 2025 American comedy-drama film, written, directed, produced, shot, and edited by Pete Ohs. It stars Zoë Chao, Callie Hernandez, James Cusati-Moyer and Jeremy O. Harris.

It had its world premiere at the 2025 South by Southwest Film & TV Festival on March 7, 2025.

== Premise ==
After a tragic accident, a woman drives down to her friends house, where she is welcomed by friends. A promising weekend away suddenly turns south after she begins developing symptoms from a tick bite.

== Cast ==
- Zoë Chao as Yvonne
- Callie Hernandez as Camille
- James Cusati-Moyer as A.J.
- Jeremy O. Harris as Isaac

== Release ==
It had its world premiere at the 2025 South by Southwest Film & TV Festival on March 7, 2025.

== Critical reception ==
John Fink of The Film Stage wrote: "A film that quite effectively melds joy, beauty, and horror elements that defy characterization." Zachary Lee of RogerEbert.com wrote: "Grooves with an improvised and charmingly undefined tempo. You can’t help but be enamored by its horrific, claustrophobic spell."
