= Erupcja =

2025 film directed by Pete Ohs

- Theatrical release poster
- Directed by: Pete Ohs
- Written by: Pete Ohs; Jeremy O. Harris; Charli XCX; Lena Góra; Will Madden
- Produced by: Pete Ohs; Jeremy O. Harris; Josh Godfrey; Luke Arreguin; Charli XCX
- Starring: Charli XCX; Lena Góra; Jeremy O. Harris; Will Madden
- Cinematography: Pete Ohs
- Edited by: Pete Ohs
- Music by: Isabella Summers; Charles Watson
- Production companies: Spartan Media Acquisitions; bb²
- Distributed by: 1-2 Special (United States)
- Release dates: September 4, 2025 (TIFF); April 17, 2026 (United States)
- Running time: 71 minutes
- Countries: United States; Poland
- Languages: English; Polish
- Budget: ~$92,000
- Box office: $404,979

Erupcja (Polish: [ɛˈrup.t͡sja], lit. 'eruption') is a 2025 drama film directed and produced by Pete Ohs, from a screenplay by Ohs, Jeremy O. Harris, Charli XCX, Lena Góra, and Will Madden. It stars Charli XCX, Góra, Harris and Madden.

It had its world premiere at the 2025 Toronto International Film Festival in the Centrepiece section on September 4, 2025, and was also released in theaters April 17, 2026.

== Plot ==
Nel lives in Warsaw, Poland, where she owns and manages the flower shop she inherited from her mother. One day, her childhood friend Bethany arrives in Warsaw with her boyfriend, Rob, marking the first time she has visited the city since beginning their relationship. After checking into their Airbnb, Rob takes a nap while Bethany explores the city on her own. As Nel closes her shop for the day, Bethany spots her and follows her home. The last time they saw each other, Bethany had promised to call Nel every other week but never did.

Meanwhile, Nel’s ex-girlfriend Ula unexpectedly appears at her apartment building, although Nel’s younger sister, Maja, had already informed her that Ula was back in town. Ula invites Nel to see a performance of A Midsummer Night’s Dream at a local theater, and Nel agrees.

The following day, Bethany and Rob spend time sightseeing. At a park, Bethany teaches Rob a few Polish phrases before they visit the National Museum. Rob secretly plans to propose to Bethany with a ring that once belonged to his grandmother, though he struggles to understand why she insisted on visiting Warsaw rather than Paris, the original destination of their trip. Later, at a café, he informs Bethany that their return flight to London has been canceled due to volcanic ash from a recent eruption of Mount Etna, extending their stay in Poland.

After a long shift at work, Nel spends the afternoon listening to music on a bridge before returning home. That night, Bethany wakes her by throwing rocks at her window and asks to come upstairs. Bethany reveals that she discovered Rob’s engagement ring a month earlier and knows he intends to propose. However, she confesses that she does not feel the same depth of connection toward him. The two spend the night clubbing and wandering through Warsaw’s streets until dawn. The next morning, Rob finds Bethany casually making coffee in the kitchen, unaware that she has been gone all night.

Following a spa date, Bethany and Rob eat at a sushi restaurant, where they meet Claude, an American painter who invites them to a party at his studio. Although Rob has made reservations at an upscale restaurant for later that evening, Bethany convinces him to attend the party first. To her surprise, she finds Nel there. During the gathering, they play poker, view Claude’s artwork, and eat KFC. As the night progresses, Bethany and Nel dance together while Rob watches from a distance. After stepping outside for fresh air, Rob returns to discover that Bethany has left the party. Later, she texts him to say that she is spending the night at Nel’s apartment and will call him the next day.

Bethany and Nel have spent the night clubbing, taking drugs, dancing with strangers, and reciting poetry until sunrise. The following morning, they visit Claude’s apartment. There, Nel explains her belief that a volcano always erupts whenever she and Bethany reunite, a phenomenon she sees as symbolic of their unique bond. Although Rob repeatedly attempts to contact Bethany, she ignores his calls. Nel admits that Rob seems like a kind person and a good match for Bethany, but Bethany dismisses him as too boring and predictable. She encourages Nel to travel more, an idea Nel begins to consider.

Later that day, Maja visits the flower shop and reminds Nel to call her later. Nel has neglected to open the shop so she can spend time showing Bethany around Warsaw. That evening, Nel and Bethany comfort Nel’s friend Jan, who is drunk after being dumped by his girlfriend. Bethany asks to stay at Nel’s apartment again, and Nel agrees. Shortly afterward, Ula arrives to remind Nel about the play they had planned to attend together. Hurt that Nel never showed up and left her to attend alone, Ula ends their relationship, though Nel appears largely indifferent. Elsewhere, Rob grows increasingly distressed by Bethany’s refusal to answer his calls. That night, Bethany cries to Nel while describing a poetic dream she had.

The next morning, Nel wakes to find a note from Bethany, who has quietly left. The note promises that they will see each other again “until the next eruption”. Though Nel is upset, Maja tells her that Bethany’s departure is probably for the best. When Nel mentions what happened with Ula, Maja encourages her to apologize. Meanwhile, Rob goes to Claude’s studio and expresses his frustration that Bethany has vanished before he had the chance to propose. At that moment, Nel calls Claude and asks him to bring Rob to the flower shop.

Once there, Nel tells Rob the story of her friendship with Bethany and her belief that volcanic eruptions coincide with their reunions. She also reveals that Bethany found the engagement ring before the trip and came to Warsaw hoping to feel something she had been missing in her life. Afterwards, Rob takes Nel and Claude to the Pomnik Syreny, where he had originally planned to propose.

After Claude leaves, Nel and Rob spend time together discussing Bethany, the events of the trip, and Nel’s relationship with Ula. Rob lets Nel take his lunch reservation he had originally made for Bethany at Opasły Tom, which turns out to be the restaurant where Nel and Ula had their first date. The next morning, Rob calls Bethany one final time and leaves a voicemail in which he recites a poem about volcanoes. Rob ultimately departs for the airport, while Nel meets Ula at Opasły Tom and apologizes for hurting her feelings. In a closing narration, it is revealed that Bethany spent a week traveling around Poland alone before returning to London. There, she apologizes to Rob and moves back in with her parents.

== Cast ==
- Charli XCX as Bethany
- Lena Góra as Nel
- Jeremy O. Harris as Claude
- Will Madden as Rob
- Agata Trzebuchowska as Ula
- Jacek Zubiel as a Narrator
- Maja Michnacka as Maja
- Jan Lubaczewski as Jan

== Production ==
In October 2024, it was announced Charli XCX, Lena Góra, Jeremy O. Harris and Will Madden had joined the cast, with Pete Ohs directing. Principal photography took place in Warsaw, Poland. Ohs intentionally made the film on a low budget so that he wouldn't have to release it if he was unsatisfied.

== Release ==
The film had its world premiere at the 2025 Toronto International Film Festival in the Centrepiece section on September 4, 2025. On September 17, 1-2 Special acquired distribution rights to the film for North America that is scheduled to be released on April 17, 2026. On November 4, Vertigo Releasing acquired the distribution rights for the United Kingdom and Ireland and plans to theatrically release the film in the second quarter of 2026.

== Reception ==
On the review aggregator website Rotten Tomatoes, 83% of 83 critics' reviews are positive. Metacritic, which uses a weighted average, assigned the film a score of 72 out of 100, based on 14 critics, indicating "generally favorable" reviews.

Adrian Horton of The Guardian gave the film two out of five stars in her review describing it a "slight and unpolished project".
