= Invasive Species (play) =

2023 play by Maia Novi

- Original language: English
- Written by: Maia Novi
- Subject: mental illness, acting, immigration
- Genre: Comedy, Experimental
- Setting: 2020s New Haven, Connecticut

Premiere
- Date: 3 June 2023
- Place: The Tank; New York City
- Directed by: Michael Breslin

Invasive Species is a play written and performed by Maia Novi. Originally premiering in New York City at The Tank in June 2023, the play went on to have an Off-Broadway production at the Vineyard Theatre, beginning May 15, 2024. The play, based on a true story, centers on Novi's admittance to a youth psychiatric hospital in New Haven, Connecticut, while she was an acting student at the Yale School of Drama.

== Plot ==
Maia is an international student suffering from severe insomnia while grappling with the rigorous training program at the Yale School of Drama. Because her accent is neither American nor Argentinian "enough," she begins to experience an identity crisis with symptoms of psychosis. She sees a psychiatrist for what she thinks is a standard check-in, but wakes up in the Youth Ward of a psychiatric hospital. She must adapt, befriend, and learn from the teens in the ward in order to get out of the hospital in time for her acting showcase.

== Production history ==
Based on a true story, the play was originally developed from journal entries Novi wrote while she was a patient at Yale New Haven Hospital's Youth Psychiatric Ward in March 2022. The play had its first public reading as part of La MaMa Experimental Theatre Club's "Experiments" reading series in October 2022, directed by Michael Breslin, produced by Amauta M. Firmino, and starring Arturo Soria, Nefesh Cordero Pino, Cat Rodriguez, Patrick Foley, and Raffi Donatich.

The Tank production, also directed by Breslin, starring Maia Novi, Sam Gonzalez, Julian Sanchez, Alexandra Maurice, and Raffi Donatich began on June 3, 2023. Executive Produced by Malena Grandio. It was here that Jeremy O. Harris first saw the play and became involved as a producer, along with Eric Kuhn, Tre Scott, Adam Rodner, Ahmad Simmons, and Danielle Perelman.

=== Off-Broadway ===
The Vineyard production began performances on May 7, 2024, and ran through June 29, 2024.

== Reception ==
=== Critical Reviews ===
The play has received positive reviews from critics. Writing for The New York Times, Laura Collins-Hughes called it a "a well acted, neatly assembled, carefully modulated play." Zachary Stewart of Theatermania described it as "an 80-minute thrill ride."

=== Merch ===
The production's merchandise was featured in New York Magazine's "Approval Matrix" under the "Highbrow Brilliant" category.
