= Machel Ross =

Dominican American theatre director

- Occupations: Theatre director; costume designer
- Employer: Bushwick Starr
- Known for: Directing premier of Black Exhibition by Jeremy O. Harris
- Awards: Lilly Award (2021)

Machel Ross is a Dominican American theatre director and costume designer. In 2019 she was awarded funding through the Women's Film, TV and Theatre Fund administered by the City of New York Mayor's Office of Media and Entertainment (MOME) to write, produce and direct Signs He Made at Home - a short film about an artist with schizophrenia. The same year she directed Black Exhibition, a choreopoem by Jeremy O. Harris which debuted at the Bushwick Starr. In 2021 she was presented with a Lilly Award for direction.

In 2022 she directed A Song of Songs - a reorchestration and queer interpretation of the biblical book Song of Songs by Agnes Borinsky - for which Ross also designed the costumes. The same year she directed Hound Dog and the Meaning of Elvis for One Turkish Family - a musical retelling of the life of Elvis Presley, which premiered at Ars Nova. As of 2026 she was associate artistic director at the Bushwick Starr.

== Awards ==
- Lilly Awards, 2021: The Stacey Mindich ‘Go Work in Theater' Award (Direction)

== Selected works ==
- A Song of Songs (2022) - direction and costume
- Hound Dog and the Meaning of Elvis for One Turkish Family (2022) - direction
- Black Exhibition (2019) - direction
- Riot Antigone (2017) - costume
