= Andrea Sisson =

Film director

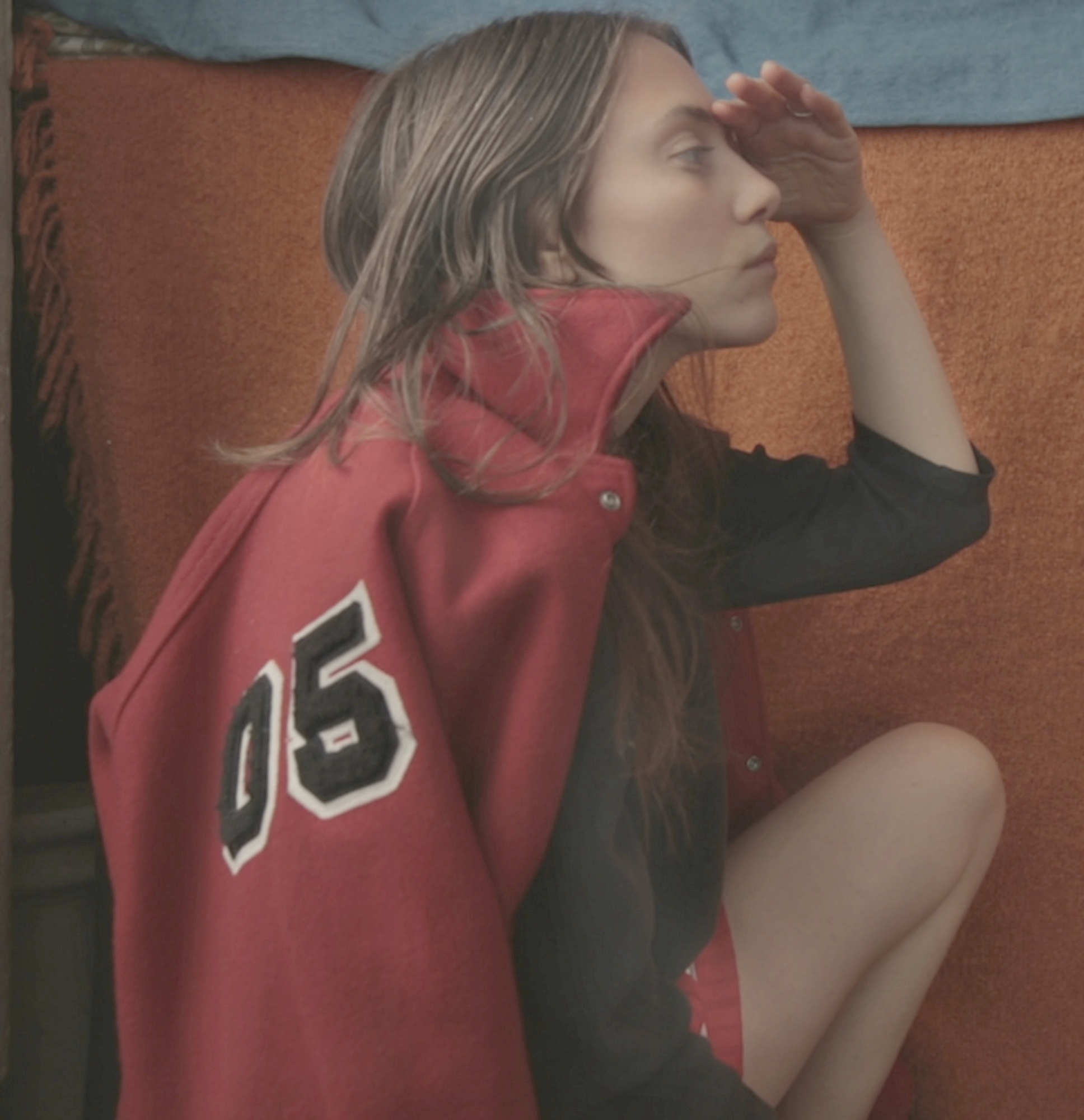
- Sisson in January 2016
- Education: Bard College
- Occupation: Film director
- Spouse: Pete Ohs (divorced)

Andrea Sisson is a Fulbright fellowship recipient and film director.

== Personal life ==
Andrea Sisson's hometown is Cleves, Ohio. In 2013, Sisson was married to fellow filmmaker Pete Ohs—whom she met at a water park in suburban Cincinnati—and living in Los Angeles. In summer 2021, Sisson was pursuing a Master of Fine Arts from the Milton Avery Graduate School of the Arts at Bard College. On September 15, 2021, Ohs filed for divorce from Sisson.

== Career ==
After receiving a Fulbright fellowship, Sisson traveled to Iceland to direct and narrate her experimental 70-minute documentary film about mental illness, I Send You This Place. The work was a 2012 official selection at the Full Frame Documentary Film Festival and Reykjavík International Film Festival, and was commercially released in summer 2013.

In 2013, Sisson and Ohs were jointly named one of Filmmaker's "25 New Faces of Independent Film". That same year, they were working on Everything Beautiful Is Far Away, a "microbudget narrative project"; at the 2017 LA Film Festival, it won the U.S. Fiction Cinematography Award.
