= Everything Beautiful Is Far Away =

2017 film directed by Pete Ohs

- Directed by: Pete Ohs; Andrea Sisson
- Written by: Pete Ohs
- Produced by: Saul Germaine; Andrea Sisson; Pete Ohs
- Starring: Julia Garner; Joseph Cross; C. S. Lee; Jillian Mayer
- Cinematography: Christian Sorensen Hansen; Pete Ohs
- Edited by: Pete Ohs; Nayim Saati; Andrea Sisson
- Music by: Alan Palomo
- Production companies: MANALI Pictures; Lauren Edward Productions
- Distributed by: The Orchard
- Release date: July 21, 2017 (Los Angeles Film Festival)
- Running time: 91 minutes
- Country: United States
- Language: English

Everything Beautiful Is Far Away is a 2017 independent science-fiction fantasy film directed by Pete Ohs and Andrea Sisson, written by Pete Ohs, starring Julia Garner and Joseph Cross. It premiered in competition at the 2017 Los Angeles Film Festival where it received the U.S. Fiction Cinematography Award.

== Plot ==
Traveling across a barren landscape, Lernert digs through piles of rubbish in an attempt to build a body for his companion Susan, the unresponsive robot head who hangs from the back of his pack. The pair comes across Rola, a spirited young woman who lacks survival skills but makes up for the deficiency with sheer determination. This unlikely trio navigates the harsh desert in search of a mythical water basin that could replenish their depleted resources and renew their will to carry on. The title is a reference to the Grandaddy song "Everything Beautiful is Far Away" whose lyrics mirror the plot and themes of the film.

== Cast ==
- Julia Garner as Rola
- Joseph Cross as Lernert
- C. S. Lee as The Stranger
- Jillian Mayer as Susan

== Reception ==
Everything Beautiful Is Far Away premiered at the 2017 Los Angeles Film Festival and received the U.S. Fiction Cinematography Award. It later screened at the Tacoma Film Festival, receiving the Best Director and Best Cinematography Awards and at the Eastern Oregon Film Festival, receiving the award for Best Feature.

Alex Billington of FirstShowing.net reviewed the film positively saying "there's a sublime simplicity to Everything Beautiful is Far Away that also helps make it feel even more endearing as a cinematic feature." The film was acquired for distribution by The Orchard.
