= Eric Kuhn =

American theatrical producer and entrepreneur

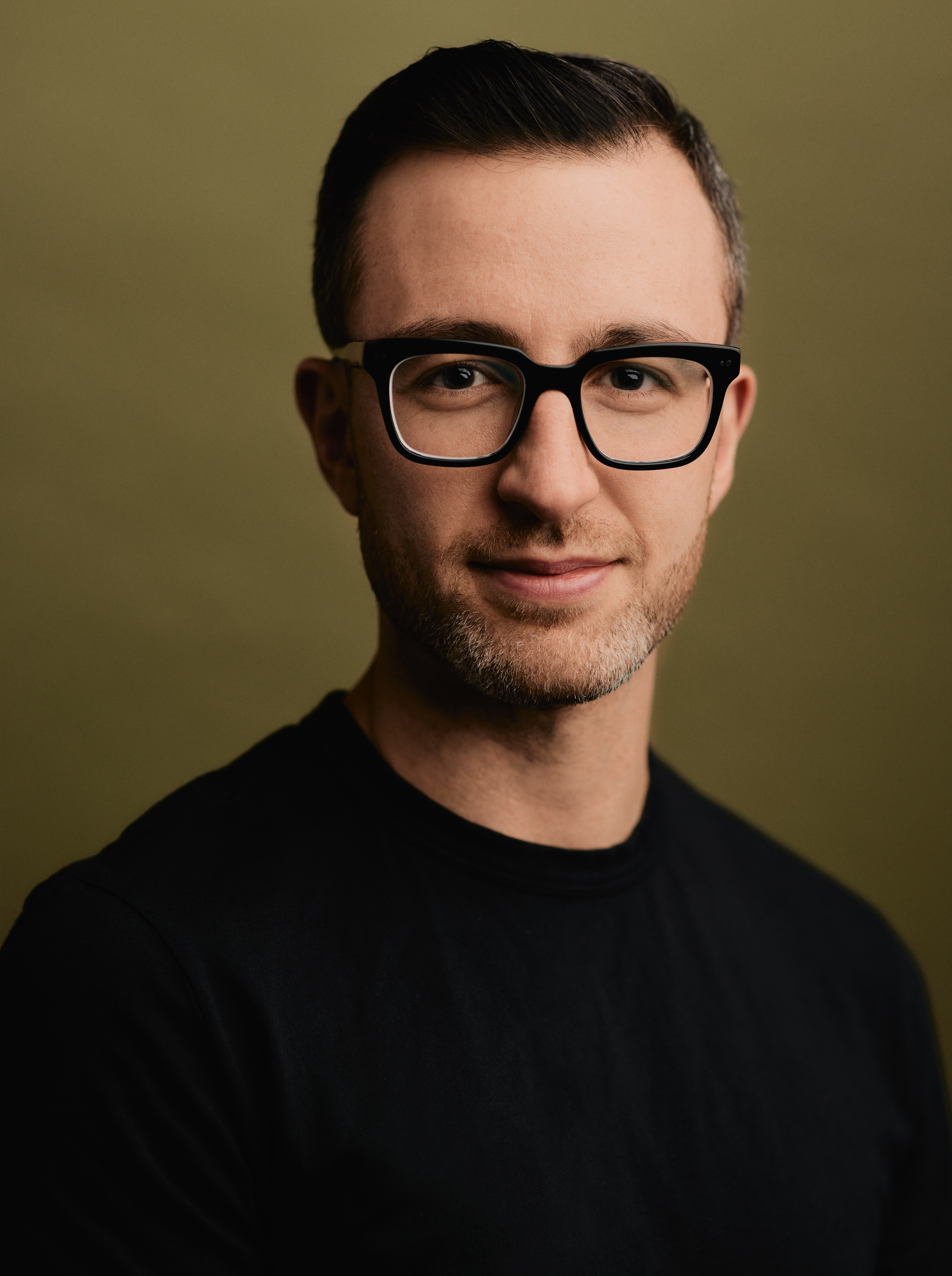
- Born: 1987 (age 38–39); New York, New York
- Education: Hamilton College
- Occupations: Theatrical producer; entrepreneur
- Board member of: American Theater Wing advisory board
- Awards: Tony Award for Oklahoma! (2019); Tony Award and Drama Desk Award for The Inheritance (2021); Tony Award for A Strange Loop (2022)

Eric Kuhn is an American entrepreneur and theatrical producer. He is a three-time Tony Award winner.

One of the first social media strategists, Kuhn launched the Twitter accounts for CBS News, CNN, and the NBA, and became the first social media agent in the entertainment industry. He was the chief marketing officer of Layer3 TV, a cable television company he co-founded that was acquired by T-Mobile, the senior social media advisor for the Michael Bloomberg 2020 presidential campaign and SVP of social media marketing at CBS.

== Early life and education ==
Kuhn was born in New York City and grew up in Hastings-on-Hudson, New York. In high school he hosted a television show on WHHS, a public access television station in Westchester County.

He attended Hamilton College and graduated with a BA in government in 2009. While at Hamilton, Kuhn hosted a radio show focused using on media and politics on WHCL.

== Career ==
=== Media ===
As a college student, Kuhn was hired by CBS News to launch the Twitter account, @CBSNews, and oversee the viral marketing for CBS Evening News with Katie Couric. He also created the social media strategy for the NBA and launched the NBA's Twitter account while in college. Following his graduation, he worked at CNN, where he managed CNN's Twitter accounts and reported on technology and politics for CNN.com. In 2010, he was hired by United Talent Agency as Hollywood's first social media agent.

In 2014, he co-founded Layer3 TV, a new cable company, and served as its chief marketing officer. The company was sold to T-Mobile in January 2018.

In 2020, he was the Bloomberg campaign's senior adviser on social media. The same year he was named senior vice president of social media marketing at CBS.

=== Film and theater ===
In 2018 Kuhn earned his first theater credit as a producer of Harvey Fierstein's Torch Song on Broadway. His first film credit as an executive producer was for the 2024 documentary Grand Theft Hamlet.

== Recognition ==
- British Film Institute Raindance Maverick Award, as executive producer, Grand Theft Hamlet, 2024
- Tony Award for Best Musical, A Strange Loop, as producer, 2022
- Tony Award for Best Play, The Inheritance, as producer, 2021
- Shorty Awards, Data Visualization, 2021
- Tony Award for Best Revival of a Musical, Oklahoma!, as producer, 2019
- The Hollywood Reporter's Next Generation Execs 2016: Hollywood Up and Comers Under 35
- Vanity Fair “Next Establishment” (2011)
- Forbes “30 under 30” in Entertainment (2012)

== Stage credits, as producer ==
=== New York ===
Year	Work	Venue	Notes	Ref
2018–2019	Harvey Fierstein's Torch Song	Hayes Theater	Broadway; as Eric Kuhn & Justin Mikita (ZKM Media)	
2019–2020	Oklahoma!	Circle in the Square Theatre	Broadway; Tony Award, Best Revival of a Musical; as ZKM Media	
2019–2020	The Inheritance	Ethel Barrymore Theatre	Broadway; Tony Award, Best Play; as ZKM Media	
2020	Lips Together, Teeth Apart	Online (Broadway.com)	Livestream reading to benefit Broadway Cares/Equity Fights AIDS COVID-19 Emergency Assistance Fund; as Eric Kuhn & Justin Mikita	
2021	Is This a Room	Lyceum Theatre	Broadway; as ZKM Media	
2021	Dana H.	Lyceum Theatre	Broadway; as ZKM Media	
2022–2023	A Strange Loop	Lyceum Theatre	Broadway; Tony Award, Best Musical; as Kuhn, Lewis & Scott	
2023	Life of Pi	Gerald Schoenfeld Theatre	Broadway; as Kuhn Dodani	
2023–2024	Shucked	Nederlander Theatre	Broadway; as ZKM Media	
2023–2024	Danny and the Deep Blue Sea	Lucille Lortel Theatre	Off-Broadway	
2024	Invasive Species	Vineyard Theatre	Off-Broadway	
2026	You Got Older	Cherry Lane Theatre	Off-Broadway	
2026	Giant	Music Box Theatre	Broadway	
2026	Cats: The Jellicle Ball	Broadhurst Theatre	Broadway; as EK Productions	

=== London ===
Year	Work	Venue	Notes	Ref
2023 -2024	The Unfriend	Criterion Theatre / Wyndham's Theatre	West End; ran Criterion Jan–Apr 2023, Wyndham's Dec 2023–Mar 2024	
2023	Accidental Death of an Anarchist	Theatre Royal Haymarket	West End	Best New Play nomination, 2024 Olivier Awards
2025	The Frogs	Southwark Playhouse	Off West End; May–June 2025	
2025	Invasive Species	King's Head Theatre	Off West End; Sep–Oct 2025	
2025	Born with Teeth	Wyndham's Theatre	13 August – 1 November 2025	
