= Callie Hernandez =

American actress (born 1988)

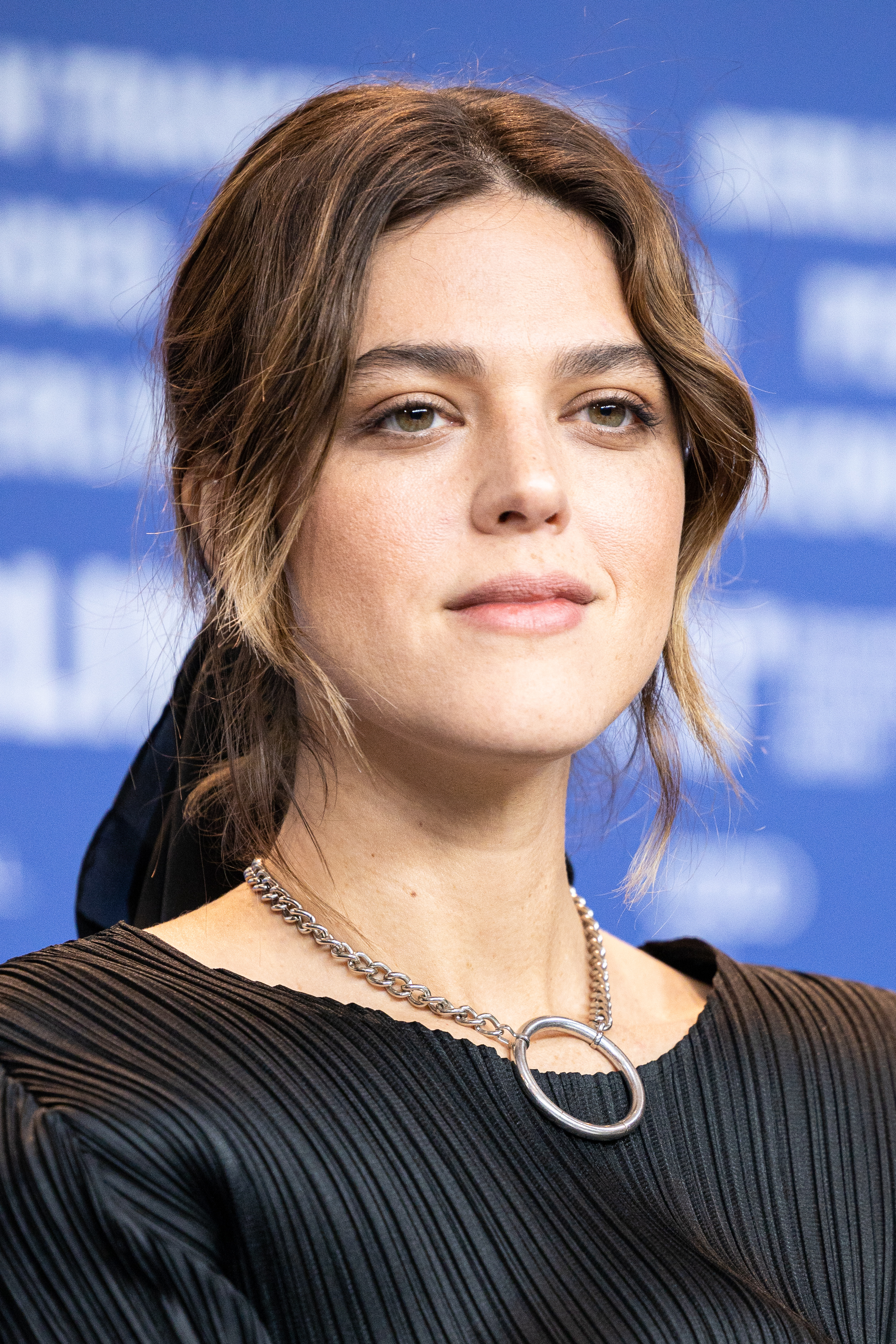
- Hernandez at the Berlinale 2020
- Born: May 24, 1988 (age 38); Jacksonville, Florida, U.S.
- Occupation: Actress
- Years active: 2013–present

Callie Marie Hernandez (born May 24, 1988) is an American actress known for her roles in the films Blair Witch (2016), La La Land (2016), The Endless (2017), and Alien: Covenant (2017), as well as for her collaborations with the independent filmmaker Pete Ohs.

== Early life ==
Hernandez was born in Jacksonville, Florida and moved with her family to San Antonio, Texas when she was 7. She attended Churchill High School and studied at the University of Texas at Austin. She considers Austin her hometown. Before acting, Hernandez played the cello in several bands.

== Career ==
In 2013, Hernandez made her debut in Machete Kills. She was cast in the ABC television series Members Only, also known as The Club, but the show was cancelled before its scheduled premiere in 2014. In 2016, she starred in Blair Witch and had a supporting role in La La Land.

From 2016 to 2017, Hernandez played Samantha in the Epix series Graves until the show's cancellation after two seasons. In 2017, she co-starred in The Endless and Alien: Covenant. She appeared in Under the Silver Lake in 2018.

In 2025, she played Clara in the HBO comedy I Love LA, and produced and acted in Pete Ohs' film The True Beauty of Being Bitten by a Tick. That year she also played Mary in Albert Birney's OBEX, which was produced by Ohs.

== Filmography ==
=== Film ===
Year	Title	Role	Notes
2013	Machete Kills	Space Babe	
2014	Sin City: A Dame to Kill For	Thelma	Uncredited
2016	Blair Witch	Lisa Arlington	
2016	La La Land	Tracy	
2017	The Endless	Anna	
2017	Alien: Covenant	Upworth	
2018	Under the Silver Lake	Millicent Sevence	
2020	One of These Days	Maria Parsons	
2022	Shotgun Wedding	Jamie	
2022	Jethica	Elena	
2024	Invention	Carrie	
2025	OBEX	Mary	
2025	The True Beauty of Being Bitten by a Tick	Camille	Also producer
2026	The Misconceived	TBA (voice)	

=== Television ===
Year	Title	Role	Notes
2014	From Dusk till Dawn: The Series	Jessie	2 episodes
2014	Members Only	Ana	Main cast (series unaired)
2016–2017	Graves	Samantha Vega	Main cast
2019	Too Old to Die Young	Amanda	Miniseries
2019	Soundtrack	Nellie	Main cast
2022	The Flight Attendant	Gabrielle Diaz	Main cast (season 2)
2025	I Love LA	Clare	2 episodes

=== Music videos ===
Year	Title	Artist
2015	"Slumlord Rising"	Neon Indian
2020	"Moonlight"	Future Islands
2023	"Meutrière (feat. Flore Benguigui)"	Alan Palomo
