= In the Line of Fire (disambiguation) =

In the Line of Fire is a 1993 American thriller film.

In the Line of Fire may also refer to:

- In the Line of Fire: A Memoir, a 2006 book by former President of Pakistan Pervez Musharraf
- In the Line of Fire (Hussein Fatal album), 1998
- In the Line of Fire (Robin Trower album), 1990
- In the Line of Fire... Larger Than Live, DragonForce live album, 2015
- In the Line of Fire, a painting by Kuzma Petrov-Vodkin
- "In the Line of Fire", an episode of the British sitcom SunTrap

== See also ==
- Line of Fire (disambiguation)
