= 1-2 Special =

American independent film distribution company

1-2 Special Inc.
- Industry: Film industry
- Founded: September 16, 2024; 2 years ago
- Founder: Jason Hellerstein
- Headquarters: New York City, New York, U.S.
- Website: 12special.com

1-2 Special Inc. is an American independent film distribution company founded by CEO Jason Hellerstein. Its first film, Urchin, was released in 2025. It has also distributed Dracula (2025), Kontinental '25 (2025), Erupcja (2025), Miroirs No. 3 (2025), and Silent Friend (2025).

== History ==
In February 2025, it was announced that former Sideshow, Magnolia Pictures acquisitions and Cinetic Media marketing and PR executive Jason Hellerstein had launched 1-2 Special, a distribution company focusing on releasing ten films a year, primarily acquisitions from film festivals.

Amanda Trokan serves as senior vice president of acquisitions, Nico Chapin as vice president of publicity, and Jonathan DeMaio as VP of distribution.

In May 2025, 1-2 Special received financial backing from production companies Cinema Inutile, Kindred Spirit, Unapologetic Projects and Fit Via Vi.

The company's first release was Urchin, directed by Harris Dickinson.

== Filmography ==
=== 2020s ===
Release Date	Title	Notes
October 10, 2025	Urchin	Un Certain Regard Best Actor / Nominated – Caméra d'Or
October 29, 2025	Dracula	Nominated – Golden Leopard
January 30, 2026	A Poet	Un Certain Regard Jury Prize
March 20, 2026	Miroirs No. 3	
March 27, 2026	Kontinental '25	Silver Bear for Best Screenplay / Nominated – Golden Bear
April 17, 2026	Erupcja	
May 8, 2026	Silent Friend	Marcello Mastroianni Award / Nominated – Golden Lion
May 29, 2026	Time and Water	co-distribution with National Geographic Documentary Films
June 19, 2026	Rose of Nevada	Nominated – Orizzonti
October 28, 2026	Closure	

=== Upcoming ===
Release Date	Title	Notes
December 18, 2026	La Gradiva	Critics’ Week Grand Prize / Nominated – Caméra d'Or
February 12, 2027	Everytime	Prix Un Certain Regard
2027	A Man of His Time	Cannes Film Festival Award for Best Screenplay / Nominated – Palme d'Or
