= Lena Góra =

Polish actress (born 1990)

- Góra at the 2025 Red Sea International Film Festival
- Born: April 1990 (age 36); Gdańsk, Poland
- Education: American Academy of Dramatic Arts
- Occupations: Actress; screenwriter; producer
- Years active: 2011–present

Lena Góra (Polish pronunciation: [ˈlɛna ˈɡura]; born April 1990) is a Polish actress, screenwriter, and producer.

== Early life ==
Góra was born in Gdańsk to a family of artists. Her father, Sławomir Góra, was a painter and her mother, Ela Wyczyńska, was a singer. She did not attend public school until the age of nine, instead attending a private art school run by her father and his artist friends. At the age of 14, she began attending acting workshops at the Teatr Wybrzeże.

She left Poland and moved to London at the age of 16. There, she worked at a bar and completed a BTEC Extended Diploma in performing arts. At the age of 19, she moved to New York City to pursue an acting career. She also began modeling to earn money. She later moved to Los Angeles, where she attended the American Academy of Dramatic Arts.

== Career ==
In 2022, Góra co-wrote, produced, and starred in the film Roving Woman, which was executive produced by Wim Wenders. Later that year, she signed with LBI Entertainment. In 2023, she co-wrote and starred in the film Imago, based on the life of her mother. For her role in the film, she won the award for Best Actress at the Polish Film Festival. She was also nominated for the Polish Film Award for Best Actress.

== Personal life ==
Góra splits her time between the United States and Poland.

== Filmography ==
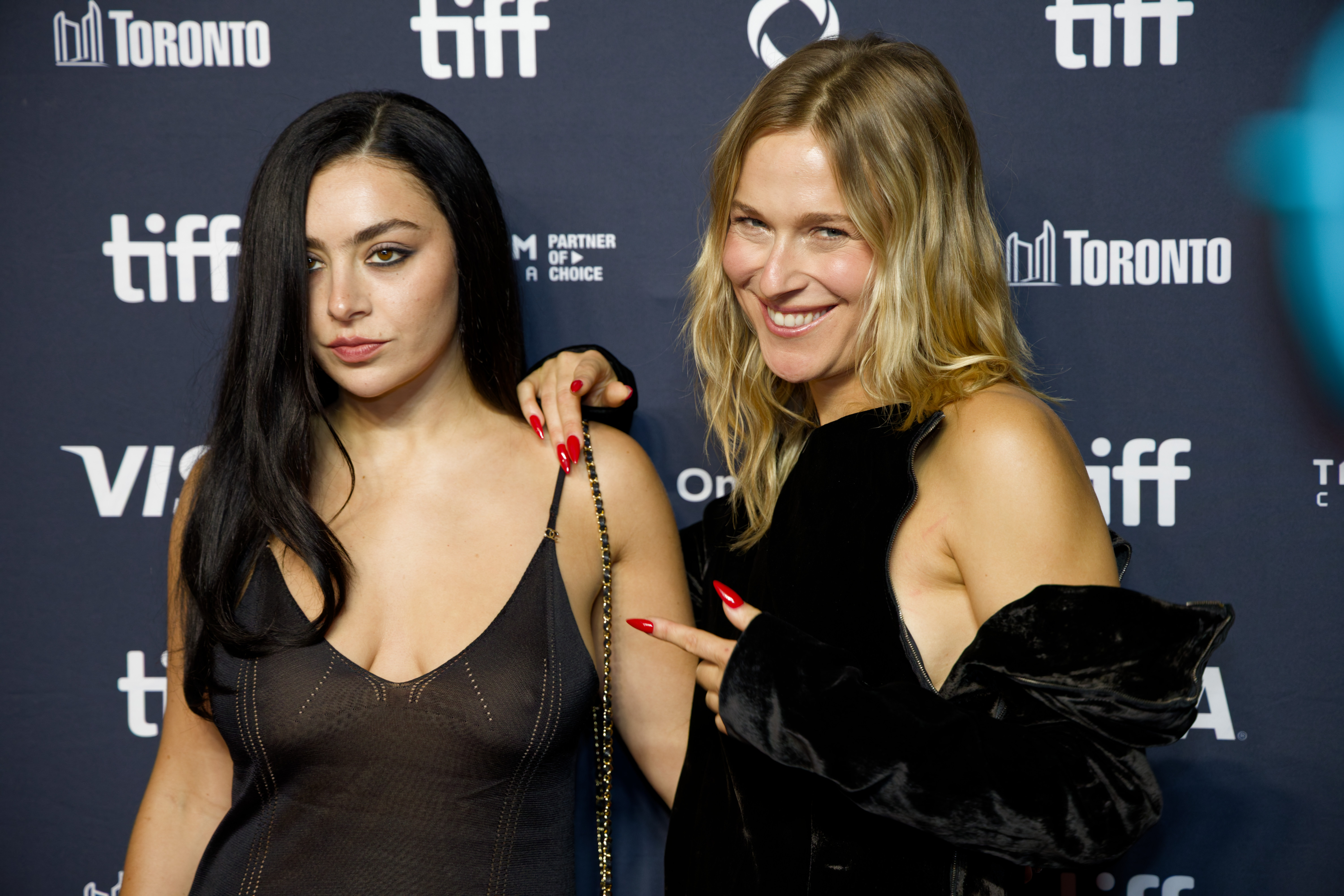
Góra (right) and Charli XCX (left) at the 2025 Toronto International Film Festival

=== Film ===
Year	Title	Role	Notes	Ref.
2016	Female Fight Club	Fighter		
2017	Cops and Robbers	Jane		
2017	Hospital Green	Katherine	Short film; also writer and producer	
2018	DJ	Alexis		
2020	Erotica 2022	Actress		
2021	Traveling Light	Clara		
2022	Roving Woman	Sara	Also writer and producer	
2022	Zołza	Screenwriter		
2022	Noc w przedszkolu	Justyna Kęs		
2023	Święty	Jola Baran		
2023	Imago	Ela Góra	Also writer	
2025	Erupcja	Nel	Also writer	
2026	King of Dope	Malwa		

=== Television ===
Year	Title	Role	Notes	Ref.
2011	Dalston Superstars	Holly Wood	3 episodes	
2020	The King of Warsaw	Anna Ziembińska	8 episodes	
2024	Będziemy mieszkać razem	Basia Lipińska	6 episodes	
2025	The Eastern Gate	Ewa Oginiec	6 episodes	
2026	High Value Target: The Hunt for Saddam	Polly Stevens	3 episodes	

== Awards and nominations ==
Award	Year	Category	Nominated work	Result	Ref.
Polish Film Festival	2023	Best Actress in a Leading Role	Imago	Won	
Polish Film Awards	2024	Best Actress	Imago	Nominated	
