= Black out performance =

Ethnicity-restricted artistic performance

A black out performance is a racially segregated performance of an artistic work for an explicitly majority Black or Black identifying audience. It has become prevalent in theatrical performances in the United States and United Kingdom.

== Origin and history ==
The concept was originated by the American playwright Jeremy O. Harris, when his play Slave Play was staged before an audience of 804 black students, artists, journalists and performers in September 2019.

Two performances in the London run of the play in 2024 were also scheduled to be black out performances. Black out performances for the play Tambo & Bones were also staged at its London run at Theatre Royal Stratford East in 2023 and for the play Samuel Takes a Break ... at the Yard Theatre in 2024.

The concept of black out performances attracted criticism in the British right wing press and as part of a broader culture war discussion after Harris discussed the concept on BBC Radio 4 promoting the London run of Slave Play. Writing in Time Out magazine, Andrzej Lukowski said that the criticism "plays into white grievance culture and is good for engagement from people who were clearly never in a million years going to see a controversial avant-garde play about interracial couples indulging in master-servant roleplay".

The London black out performances of Slave Play were criticised by a spokesperson for the British Prime Minister, Rishi Sunak, who said that " ... these reports are concerning and further information is being sought. But clearly, restricting audiences on the basis of race would be wrong and divisive". Harris responded by saying on Twitter that "I'm not even saying BLACKS ONLY I'm saying I'm inviting black ppl first! They can bring their white friends or lovers if they want. There's no colour bar ... This has happened in NYC, LA, and London (yes already happened in London!) to great acclaim. And you didn't notice. Bc you don't care".

== Theory ==
A black out performance is a theatrical performance aimed at a black or black-identifying audience, including people of mixed race. The performances take place at plays telling black stories written by black playwrights and seek to bring black audiences to such plays.

In a 2019 article on the concept of black out performances for the New York Times, Patrice Peck wrote of the performances that they can create " ... spaces for black audiences to crack jokes and clap back without apology and, afterward, process complex, nuanced race-related issues" and the "idea that seeing one's self reflected not only on the silver screen or on a stage, but also in the audience can lead to a deeper validation".

The concept has also been seen as countering the negative psychological impact of double consciousness.
