= Line of Fire =

Line of Fire may refer to:

== Television ==
- Line of Fire (2026 TV series), an American family drama television series
- Line of Fire (2003 TV series), an American crime drama television series
- Line of Fire (2002 TV series), a documentary TV series
- "Line of Fire", an episode of the TV series Miami Vice
- "Lines of Fire", an episode of the American television series Homicide: Life on the Street

== Music ==
- "Line of Fire" (song), 2008 song by E-Type & The Poodles
- "Line of Fire", a song by Journey from the album Departure
- "Line of Fire", a song by Junip from the album Junip

== Other uses ==
- Line of Fire (novel), a 1955 thriller novel by Donald Hamilton
- Line of Fire (video game), a 1989 shoot 'em up video game

== See also ==
- Direct fire, firing of a ranged weapon directly at a target within the line-of-sight of the user
- In the Line of Fire (disambiguation)
