= Jess Barbagallo =

American actor and dramatist (born c. 1984)

Jess Barbagallo (born c. 1984) is an American writer, director, and performer based in New York City.

== Biography ==
Barbagallo began writing plays while in high school, studied acting at a conservatory, and then studied playwriting in college. He has an MFA from Brooklyn College, where he won the Hiram Brown Playwriting Award in 2008 and 2009. He has described himself as being uncomfortable with his assigned gender "from puberty" and began to present as male in college.

He was a co-founder of the theater collective The Dyke Division of the Two-Headed Calf, which created and staged Room for Cream, a serial play that unfolds across multiple episodes in the manner of a soap opera, a genre it "embraces and critiques". The first three seasons from 2008 to 2010 comprised 24 episodes, with a fourth season of three episodes was staged at the New Museum in 2017. He was a member of the Writer Director Lab at Soho Rep in 2009/10 and in 2011/12 was a fellow in the mentorship program at Queer Arts.

He was a 2013 MacDowell Colony Fellow. In 2015, Barbagallo was selected to participate in the Persona Seminar think tank at the New Museum. He was invited to join the Clubbed Thumb Early Career Writer’s Group for 2016/17.

During the COVID 19 pandemic, Barbagallo co-authored, co-produced, and acted in two videos (The Puzzlers and The Puzzlers 2: Black Box) as part of the Exponential Festival, based on Samuel Beckett's Texts for Nothing. In the New York Times, Laura Collins-Hughes called them "zestfully odd and playful" with "heightened, deadpan loopiness that elicits belly laughs".

In March 2023, he co-started in Agnes Borinsky's The Trees at Playwrights Horizons.

In 2025, Barbagallo received a Special Citation Obie Award for directing Snatch Adams & Tainty McCracken Present It's That Time of the Month, which played in New York from October to December 2023.

As an actor Barbagallo has played both men and characters of unspecified gender, and he believes that cis roles should be open to trans performers. At the same time, he says that only trans actors should play trans characters, because of the history of excluding trans performers from all roles. Rather than ignoring gender categories, he believes the theater can contribute to cultural and social transformation, saying in 2016 that "Art is supposed to change the world, and our actions can do that via these representations."

Barbagallo has taught theater and writing as a guest artist and adjunct lecturer at Duke University, New York University, University of Pennsylvania, Brooklyn College, the Vermont Young Playwright’s Festival and The O’Neill Center.

== Filmography ==
=== Film ===
Year	Title	Role
2015	Christmas on Earth/Joe Ranono's Yuletide Log and Other Fruitcakes	Joe Ranono
2026	The Misconceived	TBA (voice)

=== Television ===
Year	Title	Episode	Role
2021	Law & Order: Special Victims Unit	"Return of the Prodigal Son"	Sacha Lenski
2012	Gay's Anatomy	3 episodes	Dyque van der Goose

=== Radio ===
Year	Title	Role
2021	Marvel's Wastelanders: Hawkeye	Max

=== Theater ===
Year	Title	Role
2016	O, Earth	George
2016	My Old Man (and Other Stories)	author, director
2017	Orange Julius	Nut
2018	Harry Potter and the Cursed Child, Parts One and Two	Yann Fredericks
2023	Trees	David

== Selected works ==
His writing has been published by Artforum, Howlround, Bomb Blog, New York Live Arts Blog: Context Notes, Brooklyn Rail and 53rd State Press.

- "Introduction" to Slatter, Tina, Seagull (Thinking of You) (53rd State Press: 2014), ISBN 978-0-9857577-7-9
- "Here Comes the Son" [performance review], Artforum, October 7, 2019
- "The Aesthetics of Legibility: How to Ethically Dramatize the Trans* Experience" [book review], Cincinnati Review, December 12, 2022

== Personal life ==
He is transgender.
