= Narcotics and Psychotropics Control Law =

Japanese law to control narcotics and drugs

The Narcotics and Psychotropics Control Law (麻薬及び向精神薬取締法 Mayaku oyobi kouseishin'yaku torishimari hō) is a law enacted in Japan in 1953 to control most narcotic and psychotropic drugs. It was enacted in 1953 under the name of Narcotics Control Law (麻薬取締法 Mayaku torishimari hō) and was renamed current title in 1990 along with Japan's ratification of Convention on Psychotropic Substances in the same year. It is often abbreviated to Makōhō (麻向法).

Japan has four separate laws to regulate drugs. There is one for marijuana, one for stimulants, and one for opium; the remainder of all drugs fall under the category "narcotics and psychotropics." All of these laws were written in the 1950s, although some were revised in the Heisei period in accordance with the United Nations Convention Against Illicit Traffic in Narcotic Drugs and Psychotropic Substances. Marijuana was unregulated before the American occupation of Japan; opium was banned during the Meiji Restoration. Stimulants, most commonly methamphetamine, were widely administered to soldiers and workers in the 1940s and 1950s.

The restrictions laid out by this law are comparable to Schedule II of the US's Controlled Substances Act.
