= Jeremy O. Harris =

American playwright and actor (born 1989)

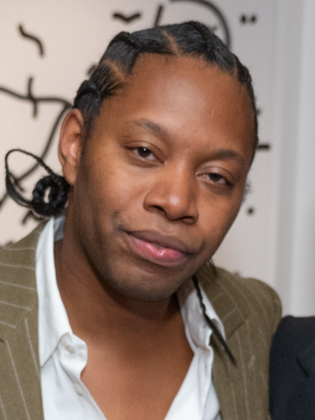
- Harris in 2024
- Born: June 2, 1989 (age 37)
- Education: DePaul University; Yale University (MFA)
- Occupations: Playwright; screenwriter
- Writing career
- Years active: 2009–present
- Notable work: Slave Play (2018)

Jeremy O. Harris (born June 2, 1989) is an American playwright, actor, and screenwriter. Harris gained prominence for his 2018 Slave Play, which received a nomination for the Tony Award for Best Play. Harris is also known for his work in film and television. He produced and co-wrote the A24 film Zola (2021), for which he received a nomination for the Independent Spirit Award for Best Screenplay. He acted in the HBO Max series Gossip Girl (2021), the Netflix series Emily in Paris (2022), and in the film The Sweet East (2023).

== Early life and education ==
Harris grew up in a military family, moving often before settling in Martinsville, Virginia. He has since lived in Chicago, Los Angeles, and New York City. He attended the Carlisle School in Martinsville, Virginia. Harris studied toward a Bachelor of Fine Arts degree in acting from The Theatre School at DePaul University in 2009, but was cut from the program after a year. In 2019, he graduated with a Master of Fine Arts degree in playwriting from the Yale School of Drama.

== Career ==
=== 2016–2019: Early work and Slave Play ===
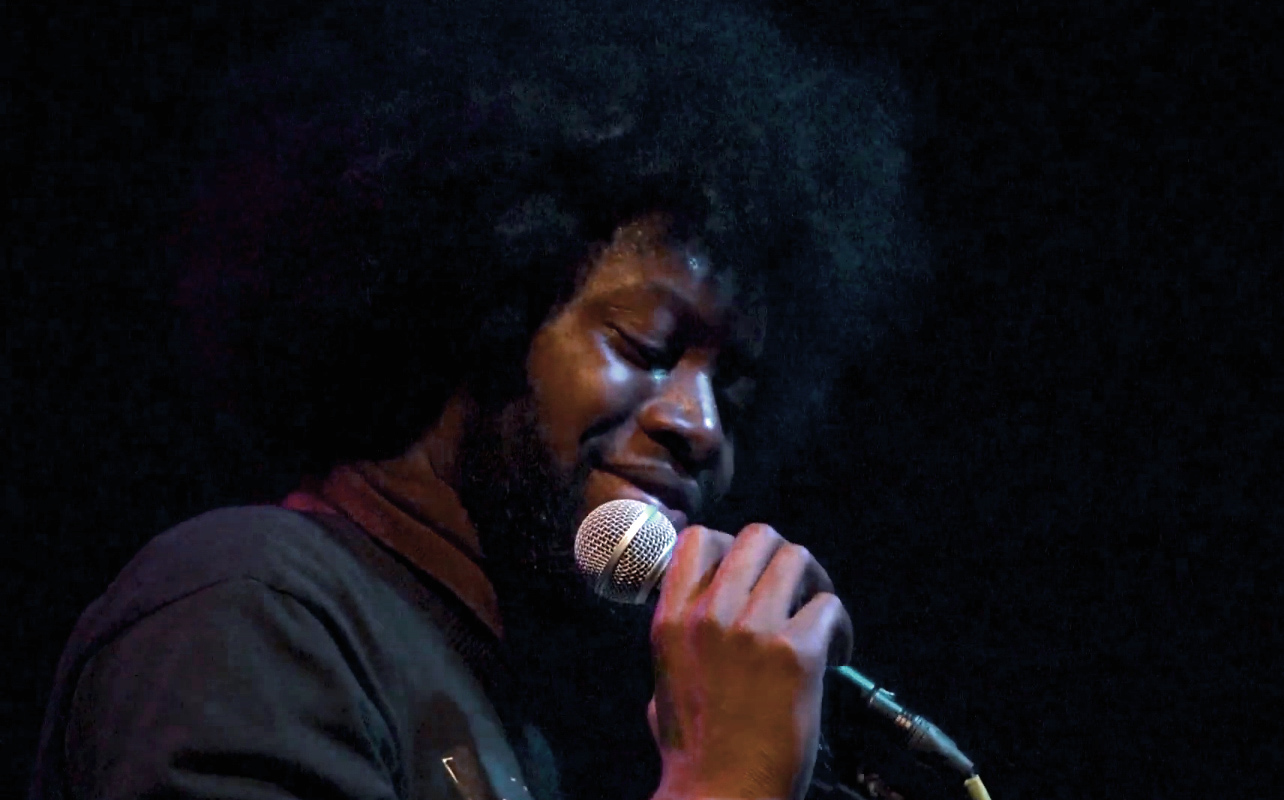
Harris at a poetry reading at CultureHub in New York City 2018

Harris landed a role in the play Jon at the Steppenwolf Theatre Company. He worked as an actor in Chicago, then moved to Los Angeles to further his career. There he began a collaboration with musician Isabella Summers that resulted in the play Xander Xyst, Dragon 1; the play was produced at ANT Fest 2017 in New York. He had a residency at the MacDowell Colony, where he wrote the play "Daddy", in which a young black artist (Franklin) becomes involved with an older European art collector (Andre). "Daddy" served as Harris's writing sample when he applied to the Yale School of Drama, where he began studies in the fall of 2016.

At Yale, Harris wrote Slave Play, where it was produced in October 2017, and won the Lorraine Hansberry Playwriting Award and the Rosa Parks Playwriting Award at the 2018 American College Theatre Festival. Slave Play was then produced off-Broadway at the New York Theatre Workshop under the direction of Robert O'Hara in 2018, Harris's first professional production as playwright. The play addresses sexuality and racial trauma in America. It begins with interracial sexual violence on a slave plantation in the American South and continues in present-day America at a sex therapy retreat for interracial couples. The couples include black participants who are no longer able to receive pleasure from their white partners. The white partners have a blind-spot about the role that race plays in their relationships. Critic Jesse Green summarized the play's message by saying "that one race lives with history each day while another pretends not to". Though critically acclaimed, the play drew ire from those who found the play's content disrespectful of African-American history. For the 74th Tony Awards, Slave Play was nominated for a historic total of 12 awards. This broke the record previously set by the 2018 revival of Angels in America for most nominations for a non-musical play. Harris was the winner of the 2018 Paula Vogel Playwriting Award, given by the Vineyard Theatre in New York City. A profile in The New York Times said that Harris's "ability to render subconscious trauma into provocative theatrical expression, as potentially unsettling as entertaining, has earned him a lot of attention in a very short time." Out called him "the queer black savior the theater world needs".

In 2018, Harris was awarded the Paula Vogel Playwriting Award, which includes a residency at the off-Broadway Vineyard Theatre. In 2019, The New Group and the Vineyard Theatre co-produced a revised version of Harris's earlier play "Daddy". starring Alan Cumming. Reviewer Christian Lewis called the play "a bold, experimental, political, and important work of theater that will not soon be forgotten". New York Times reviewer Ben Brantley noted some excellent performances, but found the dialogue "endless and circular and repetitive" and the play too "cerebral". In November 2019, an experimental work entitled Black Exhibition, credited under the pseudonym @GaryXXXFisher, debuted at the Brooklyn theater Bushwick Starr. Using Ntozake Shange's term choreopoem to describe its structure, Harris combines language and movement in a work that centers on five characters: San Francisco writer Gary Fisher, Kathy Acker, Yukio Mishima, Samuel R. Delany, and Missouri college athlete Michael L. Johnson. It was directed by Machel Ross.

=== 2021–present: Career expansion ===
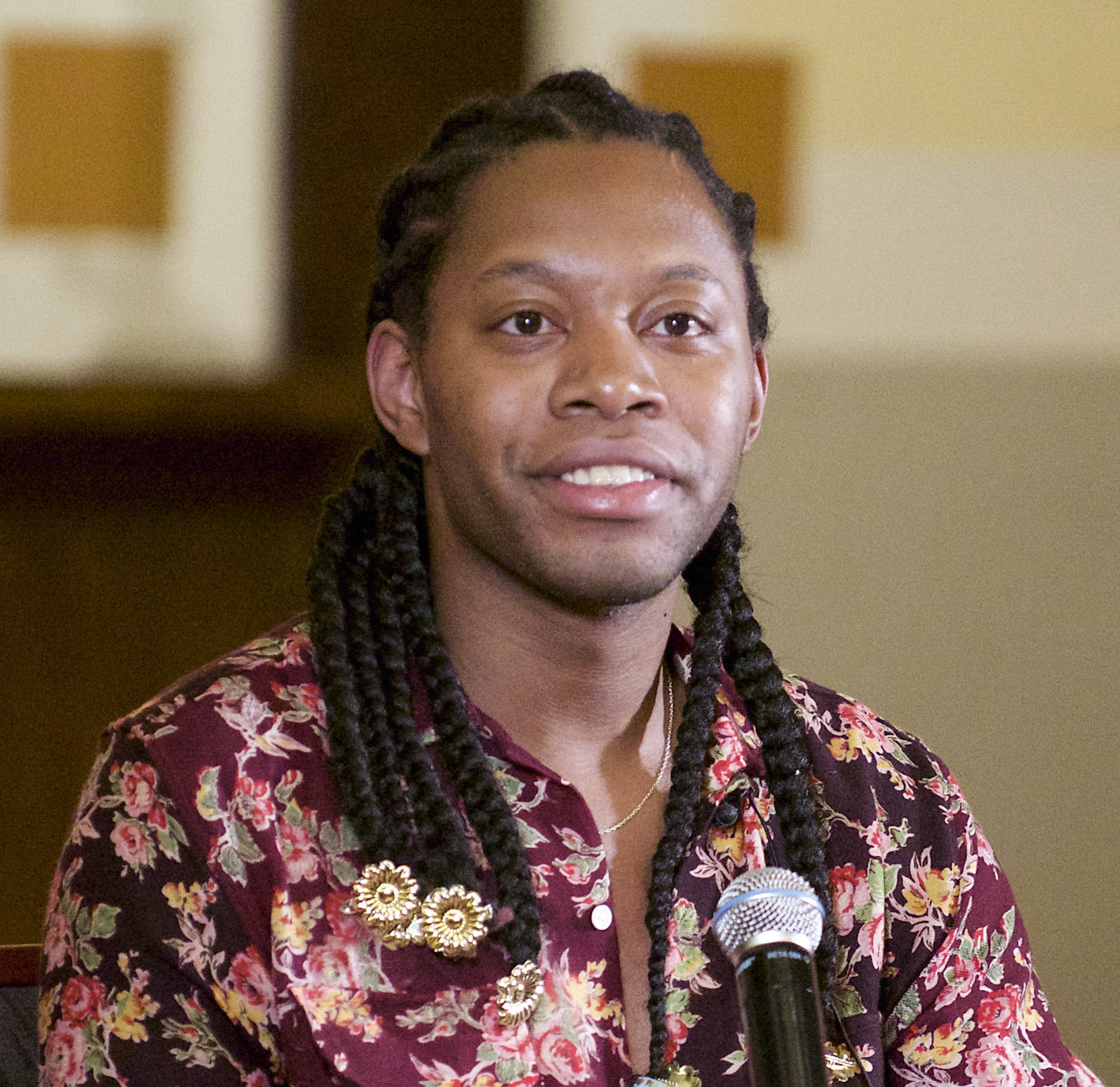
Harris in 2020

In early 2020, Harris signed a deal with HBO, and is developing a pilot as well as becoming a co-producer for season 2 of Euphoria, after consulting on the first season. Later in 2020, he set $50,000 commissions for new stage work. Harris published a condensed version of his play Yell: A Documentary of My Time Here in n+1 magazine's Fall 2020 issue. Harris describes the full play as "a site-specific document of [his] time in the space of Yale School of Drama".

Harris is a co-author on the screenplay for the A24 film Zola (2021), directed by Janicza Bravo. The film follows a road trip that results in sex-trafficking, and is based on a real-life Twitter thread. The film starred Taylour Paige, Riley Keough, Nicholas Braun, and Colman Domingo. The film earned positive reviews with Harris earning a nomination for the Independent Spirit Award for Best Screenplay. Harris also acted in the HBO Max series Gossip Girl (2021), the Netflix series Emily in Paris (2022). Harris was cast in the Sean Price Williams directed film The Sweet East (2023) alongside Ayo Edebiri. The film premiered at the 2023 Cannes Film Festival where it screened in the Directors' Fortnight selection.

== 'Black out' performances ==
Harris originated the concept of the Black out performance in which an artistic work is staged for an explicitly majority black or black identifying audience. It has become prevalent in theatrical performances in the United States and Britain. The performances take place at plays telling black stories written by Black playwrights and seek to bring Black audiences to such plays. The concept has also been seen as countering the negative psychological impact of double consciousness that can be experienced by black people.

== Philanthropy ==
As of 2020, Harris has pledged and redistributed a significant portion of his earnings from collaborations with the fashion industry and an HBO deal to The New York Theatre Workshop, libraries across the United States, and microgrants to the Bushwick Starr theater in New York.

For the New York Theatre Workshop, Harris has created two $50,000 commissions for new works by black women playwrights. He produced streaming for both Heroes of the Fourth Turning (a remount of an earlier digital reading) and Circle Jerk (later produced as a physical production by the same team), donated a collection of plays by black writers to one library in each of the 50 states, plus Washington, D.C., Puerto Rico, and Guam, and pledged various fees and royalties from Slave Play to fund $500 microgrants, administered by the Bushwick Starr theater, to 152 U.S.-based playwrights.

In 2020, Harris sent a letter to then-president-elect Joe Biden, urging him to revive the Federal Theatre Project, and then used an appearance on Late Night with Seth Meyers to further advocate the idea.

In October 2026, Harris spoke to Vanity Fair about a "crisis moment" on Broadway, inviting New York City mayor Zohran Mamdani to have a conversation "about how to make theater more accessible in the city, how to bring the rents down on theater, how we do a theater rent-freeze somehow, because I think that there is something really frightening about the greatest city in the world not having the greatest culture in the world.”

== Personal life ==
Harris is gay. Media outlets have discussed his physical appearance, such as his 6 ft 5 in (1.96 m) height and what GQ called his "dandyish style".

On November 16, 2025, Harris was arrested on suspicion of smuggling after arriving at Naha Airport in Japan; as confirmed by Okinawa Regional Customs, 780 mg of MDMA was found in his carry-on luggage, a violation of the country's Narcotics and Psychotropics Control Law. He was released after three weeks.

== Works ==
=== Theatre ===
| Year | Title | Role | Venue | Ref. |
|---|---|---|---|---|
| 2017 | the feels...(kms) | Playwright | Yale Cabaret | |
| 2017 | Xander Xyst, Dragon 1 | Playwright | Yale Cabaret | |
| 2018 | Slave Play | Playwright | New York Theatre Workshop, Off-Broadway | |
| 2019 | Slave Play | Playwright | John Golden Theatre, Broadway | |
| 2021 | Slave Play | Playwright | August Wilson Theatre, Broadway | |
| 2024 | Slave Play | Playwright | Noël Coward Theatre, West End | |
| 2019 | Daddy: A Melodrama | Playwright | Alice Griffin Jewel Box Theatre | |
| 2022 | Daddy: A Melodrama | Playwright | Almeida Theatre, West End | |
| 2019 | Black Exhibition | Playwright | Bushwick Starr, Brooklyn | |
| 2019 | Yell: A Documentary of My Time Here | Playwright | Iseman Theater, Yale School of Drama | |
| 2022 | Ain't No Mo' | Co-Producer | Belasco Theatre, Broadway | |
| 2023 | The Sign in Sidney Brustein's Window | Producer | Brooklyn Academy of Music, Off-Broadway | |
| 2023 | The Sign in Sidney Brustein's Window | Producer | James Earl Jones Theatre, Broadway | |
| 2024 | Invasive Species | Producer | Vineyard Theatre, Off-Broadway | |
| 2025 | Prince Faggot | Producer | Playwrights Horizons, Off-Broadway | |
| 2025 | Spirit of the People | Playwright | MainStage Theatre, Williamstown Theatre Festival | |

Unproduced plays

- A Boy's Company Presents: 'Tell Me If I'm Hurting You' (2020)

=== Film ===
| Year | Title | Role | Notes | Ref. |
|---|---|---|---|---|
| 2021 | Zola | —N/a | Co-writer with Janicza Bravo | |
| 2023 | The Sweet East | Matthew | | |
| 2023 | Pet Shop Days | —N/a | Executive producer | |
| 2025 | The True Beauty of Being Bitten by a Tick | Isaac | Also producer | |
| 2025 | Erupcja | Claude | Also co-writer and producer | |
| 2025 | Sacrifice | DK | | |

=== Television ===
| Year | Title | Role | Notes | Ref. |
|---|---|---|---|---|
| 2018 | High Maintenance | Tyrell | Episode: "Derech" | |
| 2019 | What We Do in the Shadows | Colby | Episode: "Manhattan Night Club" | |
| 2021 | Ziwe | Blossr Spokesperson | Episode: "Beauty Standards" | |
| 2021 | Gossip Girl | Himself | 2 episodes | |
| 2021–2022 | Emily in Paris | Grégory Elliot Duprée | 4 episodes | |
| 2022 | Irma Vep | —N/a | Supervising producer; 8 episodes | |
| 2022 | Euphoria | —N/a | Co-producer; 4 episodes | |

=== Music videos ===
| Year | Title | Artist(s) | Role |
|---|---|---|---|
| 2026 | "Don't Leave Me on the Dance Floor" | Carly Rae Jepsen | Director |

== Awards and nominations ==
- Paula Vogel Playwriting Award, 2018
- Lotos Foundation Prize, 2018
- Rosa Parks Playwriting Award, 2018
- Lorraine Hansberry Playwriting Award, 2018

In June 2019, to mark the 50th anniversary of the Stonewall riots, a series of demonstrations that represent the start of the modern LGBT rights movement, Queerty named Harris one of the Pride50 "trailblazing individuals who actively ensure society remains moving towards equality, acceptance and dignity for all queer people."

| Year | Association | Category | Nominated work | Result |
|---|---|---|---|---|
| 2020 | Tony Award | Best Play | Slave Play | Nominated |
| 2020 | Human Rights Campaign | Equality Award | Himself | Honoree |
| 2021 | Independent Spirit Award | Best Screenplay | Zola | Nominated |
| 2022 | NAACP Image Awards | Outstanding Writing in a Motion Picture | Zola | Nominated |
| 2022 | Black Reel Awards | Best Screenplay | Zola | Nominated |
| 2022 | Black Reel Awards | Outstanding First Screenplay | Zola | Nominated |
| 2023 | Obie Award | Special Citation | Circle Jerk | Won |
| 2023 | Tony Award | Best Play | Ain't No Mo' | Nominated |
| 2023 | Tony Award | Best Revival of a Play | The Sign in Sidney Brustein's Window | Nominated |

== See also ==
- African-American Tony nominees and winners
- LGBT culture in New York City
- List of LGBT people from New York City
- John Golden Theatre
