= James N. Kienitz Wilkins =

American filmmaker

- Born: U.S.
- Occupations: Filmmaker, artist, writer, Professor
- Years active: 2005–present

James N. Kienitz Wilkins is an American filmmaker, artist, and writer based in Brooklyn, New York. He is best known for his films Public Hearing (2012), Common Carrier (2019), Still Film (2023) and The Misconceived (2026). He is assistant professor of Screen Studies at Eugene Lang College of Liberal Arts, The New School.

== Life and career ==
Kienitz Wilkins graduated from The Cooper Union School of Art, where he made early short films including Springtime (2007) and Nature Mature (2007). His debut feature documentary, Public Hearing (2012), premiered at CPH:DOX. His works have screened at the Berlin International Film Festival, Toronto International Film Festival, New York Film Festival, and International Film Festival Rotterdam. In 2016, he was named one of Filmmaker Magazine's "25 New Faces of Independent Film".

Kienitz Wilkins's most recent feature, The Misconceived (2026), had its world premiere at the International Film Festival Rotterdam.

== Selected filmography ==
- 2012: Public Hearing
- 2017: Common Carrier
- 2017: The Republic
- 2019: The Plagiarists
- 2023: Still Film
- 2026: The Misconceived

== Awards and nominations ==
Year	Result	Award	Category	Work	Ref.
2012	Nominated	CPH:DOX	New Vision Award	Public Hearing	
2015	Won	Ann Arbor Film Festival	George Manupelli Founders Spirit Award	Special Features	
2016	Nominated	International Film Festival Rotterdam	Tiger Award for Short Film	B-ROLL with Andre	
2019	Won	Tacoma Film Festival	Best Screenplay	The Plagiarists	
