= Slave Play =

2018 play by Jeremy O. Harris

- Broadway promotional poster
- Original language: English
- Written by: Jeremy O. Harris
- Characters: Kaneisha; Jim; Phillip; Alana; Dustin; Gary; Teá; Patricia
- Subject: Racism, sexuality, power relations, trauma, interracial relationships

Premiere
- Date: November 19, 2018
- Place: New York Theatre Workshop
- Official website

Slave Play is a three-act play by Jeremy O. Harris about race, sex, power relations, trauma, and interracial relationships. It follows three interracial couples undergoing "Antebellum Sexual Performance Therapy" because the black partners have begun struggling to feel arousal or pleasure when engaging sexually with their white partners. The title refers both to the history of slavery in the United States and to sexual slavery role-play.

Harris originally wrote the play in his first year at the Yale School of Drama, and it debuted on a major stage on November 19, 2018, in an Off-Broadway New York Theatre Workshop staging directed by Robert O'Hara. It opened on Broadway at the John Golden Theatre on October 6, 2019. In 2019, Slave Play was nominated for Best Play in the Lucille Lortel Awards, and Claire Warden won an Outstanding Fight Choreography Drama Desk Award for her work in the play. The play has been the center of controversy due to its themes and content. At the 74th Tony Awards, Slave Play received 12 nominations, breaking the record set by the 2018 revival of Angels in America for most nominations for a non-musical play, though it did not receive any awards. The record was broken in 2024 when Stereophonic received 13 nominations.

== Characters ==
- Kaneisha – A 28-year-old black woman who is in a relationship with Jim. She plays a slave in the first act and has anhedonia. She speaks in a natural Southern dialect throughout.
- Jim – A 35-year-old wealthy white man who is in a relationship with Kaneisha. He plays a slave overseer in the first act, and has a British accent in the following acts.
- Phillip – A 30-year-old mixed-race man who is in a relationship with Alana. He plays a mulatto servant in the first act and he has anhedonia.
- Alana – A 36-year-old white woman who is in a relationship with Phillip. She plays a mistress in the first act.
- Dustin – A 28-year-old gay Latino man who is in a relationship with Gary. He is called "a white man but the lowest type of white—dingy, and off-white" despite being of another race. He plays an indentured servant in the first act.
- Gary – A 27-year-old gay black man who is in a relationship with Dustin. He plays a black overseer in the first act and he has anhedonia.
- Teá – A 26-year-old light-skinned black woman who is in a relationship with Patricia. She studies black feminism and queer theory, and is conducting a study in Racialized Inhibiting Disorder in interracial couples with Patricia.
- Patricia – A 30-year-old mixed-race Latina woman who is in a relationship with Teá. She studies cognitive psychology, and is holding a study in Racialized Inhibiting Disorder in interracial couples with Teá.

== Plot ==
=== Act One: "Work" ===
At McGregor Plantation, a southern cotton plantation in pre-Civil War Virginia, the song "Work" by Rihanna plays in the overseer cottage. Kaneisha, a slave, begins to twerk to the song when Jim, a white slave owner, walks in holding a whip. Jim is repeatedly uncomfortable when Kaneisha calls him "Master," but berates her for not cleaning the room better and throws a cantaloupe on the ground and tells Kaneisha to eat it. As Kaneisha eats the cantaloupe, she begins to dance again, which confuses and arouses Jim. The overseer then initiates sex with Kaneisha. When she asks to be called a "nasty, lazy negress," he instead proceeds to perform cunnilingus.

At her boudoir, Madame McGregor, the wife of Master McGregor, or Alana, calls upon Phillip, her mulatto servant, and asks him to play the fiddle. Phillip begins to play Beethoven's Op. 132. Alana stops him, calling European music boring, and asks him to play "negro" music. Phillip plays "Pony" by Ginuwine and Alana dances, then initiates sex, saying she is under Phillip's mulatto spell. She then uses a dildo to penetrate him, asking him if he likes being in the woman's position. Phillip replies that he is unsure.

In the McGregor's barn, Gary, a black slave, is in charge of Dustin, a white indentured servant. Gary taunts Dustin, finding their allocation of power amusing. Gary kicks Dustin down, calling him lesser than other white people. The song “Multi-Love” by Unknown Mortal Orchestra begins to play. The two fight before they engage in sexual intimacy. Gary has Dustin lick Gary's boot clean; this causes Gary to orgasm. He starts crying and cannot be comforted by Dustin.

Meanwhile, Phillip keeps playing music that Alana does not like on his fiddle and Kaneisha and Jim are engaged in sex. Kaneisha asks again to be called a "negress." Even as Kaneisha nears orgasm, Jim stops participating when Kaneisha calls him "Masta Jim". Jim then switches to speaking in a British accent and tells Kaneisha that he is not comfortable with the situation. Jim uses his safeword, "Starbucks," to end the encounter.

New characters in modern clothing, Patricia and Teá (also an interracial couple) then come into the room. They recommend for the three couples to meet back at the main house soon. It is revealed that in reality the characters are modern couples participating in a role-playing exercise meant to improve intimacy between white and black partners.

=== Act Two: "Process" ===
There is a contemporary group therapy session among the three couples to treat their inability to experience sexual pleasure. The therapists, Patricia and Teá, speak through affirmations and academic jargon for most of the session. They are on Day Four of the therapy, which focuses on fantasy play.

Dustin begins by noting that Gary came, which he could not do before, but Gary counters that Dustin was uncomfortable in making his whiteness hyper-visible. Alana enjoyed the release of the fantasy and asks Phillip if he enjoyed it too, noting that he got an erection when he had trouble before. Jim keeps interrupting speakers with laughter; Teá asks him to share, especially since he was the one who said the safeword. Jim is confused and overwhelmed by the therapy. Teá clarifies that the therapy, titled Antebellum Sexual Performance Therapy, was designed to help black partners feel pleasure again with their white partners. Jim is uncomfortable playing the role of the slave overseer and demeaning his wife, and believes the experience is traumatizing and ruining his relationship with Kaneisha. Kaneisha feels frustrated and betrayed that Jim did not give what she asked of him.

After Patricia and Teá read back to the group what they have said, Alana points out that mostly white men are speaking. Dustin insists that he is not white. Dustin and Gary get back into an old argument over Dustin wanting to move into a more gentrified neighborhood. Dustin refuses to label himself as white, and Gary feels that through this he erases Gary's identity. Phillip, who has not spoken much, says that the therapy seems fake to him. Alana speaks over him, still upset about Jim saying the safeword.

Patricia and Teá explain the origins of Antebellum Sexual Performance Therapy in treating anhedonia, with Patricia speaking over Teá. The couple shaped it as their thesis together at Smith and then Yale. They are foregrounding the study both through their experiences in their own relationship and their academic background. They state that anhedonia is caused by racial trauma passed down through history: black partners may be unable to enjoy sex with their white partners because of “Racialized Inhibiting Disorder." Teá previously experienced anhedonia with Patricia, and it was through fantasy play that she worked out her racial trauma. Symptoms associated with Racialized Inhibiting Disorder include anxiety, obsessive-compulsive disorder, and "musical obsession disorder."

Phillip says none of his partners are able to see him as black and he struggles with being mixed race. Gary realizes that the song he often hears, “Multi-Love”, was imagined due to "musical obsession disorder." Kaneisha says she felt in control during the fantasy play, but Jim took that away from her by using the safeword; Gary agrees but Phillip does not. It is revealed that Phillip and Alana met because her ex-husband had a cuckold fetish, and that when Phillip was with her under those pretenses, he felt sexually excited because he was viewed as black by her husband, thus affirming a sense of categorized sexual identity other than just “Phillip” after a lifetime of feeling like he didn’t belong as “black” or “white.” Alana insists it had nothing to do with race, and now that they are in a committed relationship Alana views him as a complex person. Alana breaks down. Gary confronts Dustin, asking why he always says he is not white. Gary questions why they are still together, and he and Dustin almost get into a fight before Patricia and Teá break it up.

Jim starts to read something he wrote on his phone. He does not understand why Kaneisha looks at him with disgust, like he is "a virus," nor does he know what he is supposed to do. Kaneisha realizes that "virus" is the description she has been searching for, referencing the diseases introduced by Europeans which decimated the indigenous peoples of the Americas. She says she knows now that she cannot experience pleasure because she cannot forget her disgust with Jim's race. She confronts Patricia and Teá, saying they are wrong: the problem is within the white partners, not a disorder within the black partners. Kaneisha is overwhelmed as “Work” by Rihanna begins playing again.

=== Act Three: "Exorcise" ===
"Work" plays as Kaneisha is packing in a room and Jim comes in. Kaneisha says that what she needs is not better communication, but for Jim to simply listen. Jim is silent as Kaneisha recounts how they met, and then times in her childhood when she had to visit plantations on school field trips. As the only black girl, she felt a need to act proud for her "elders" watching her. She says she fell in love with Jim, a white man, because he was not American. Jim begins to initiate foreplay and the music rises while Kaneisha continues that the relationship went downhill three years ago, when she stopped feeling sexual pleasure because she began to see him as foreign and frightening. She saw Jim's whiteness and power, and that he also has "the virus", because though he is not American, he benefits from being white while being unaware of the privilege that whiteness gives him. She says that Antebellum Sexual Performance Therapy and the fantasy play gave her a sense of peace because she feels the elders watching her again; the elders do not care that she is with "a demon / who thinks he’s a saint", but simply want the two of them to know he is a demon.

Jim calls Kaneisha a "negress" and gags her; the music stops. Jim returns to performing his slave owner role, dominating and insulting Kaneisha. She silently consents to continue, but when Jim initiates forceful sex she struggles free and screams the safeword. She begins to cry, then laugh, and Jim cries as well as they comfort each other. Kaneisha stands and thanks Jim for listening.

== Themes ==
Slave Play deals with the themes of race, sex, power relations, trauma, and interracial relationships. Lapacazo Sandoval wrote that the play provides a real look at racism in America, especially in how racism persists even past the abolition of slavery. The play attempts to uncover current racism and microaggressions through the lens of slavery. Aisha Harris, writing for The New York Times, said the play “bluntly confronts the lingering traumas of slavery on black Americans." Through the reoccurring theme of psychoanalysis, Jeremy O. Harris examines how slavery still impacts both the mental states, and the relationships, of black people in the present.

By staging a conversation between slavery and the present, the play uses the theme of time and history to depict how the trauma of slavery persists. As Tonya Pinkins writes, racism does not have a safe word in the play, and throughout the narrative, white characters are forced to recognize their historical and social locations in relation to their partners. The play dwells on the impact of black erasure in interracial relationships. Throughout the narrative, the white partners are incapable of recognizing, or naming, their partner's race, rather it is because of guilt, or because they get defensive. The play also explores the intersection of gender and race in the context of various relationship types (black woman and white man, white woman and mixed-race man, black man and white man, mixed-race woman and brown woman), thus further complexifying the characters’ individual concepts of identity, power, connection, and pleasure. By placing sex and racial dynamics in both juxtaposition and overlap through the Antebellum Sexual Performance Therapy, the play makes whiteness, and white privilege, hyper visible in interracial relationships. Soraya Nadia McDonald points out that the play works to uncover racial innocence. Racial innocence is the concept that white people are innocent of race, and therefore they are racially neutral. By placing the white characters in the position of the master, the mistress, or the indentured servant, the play makes whiteness visible to the white characters.

== Production history ==
=== Background ===
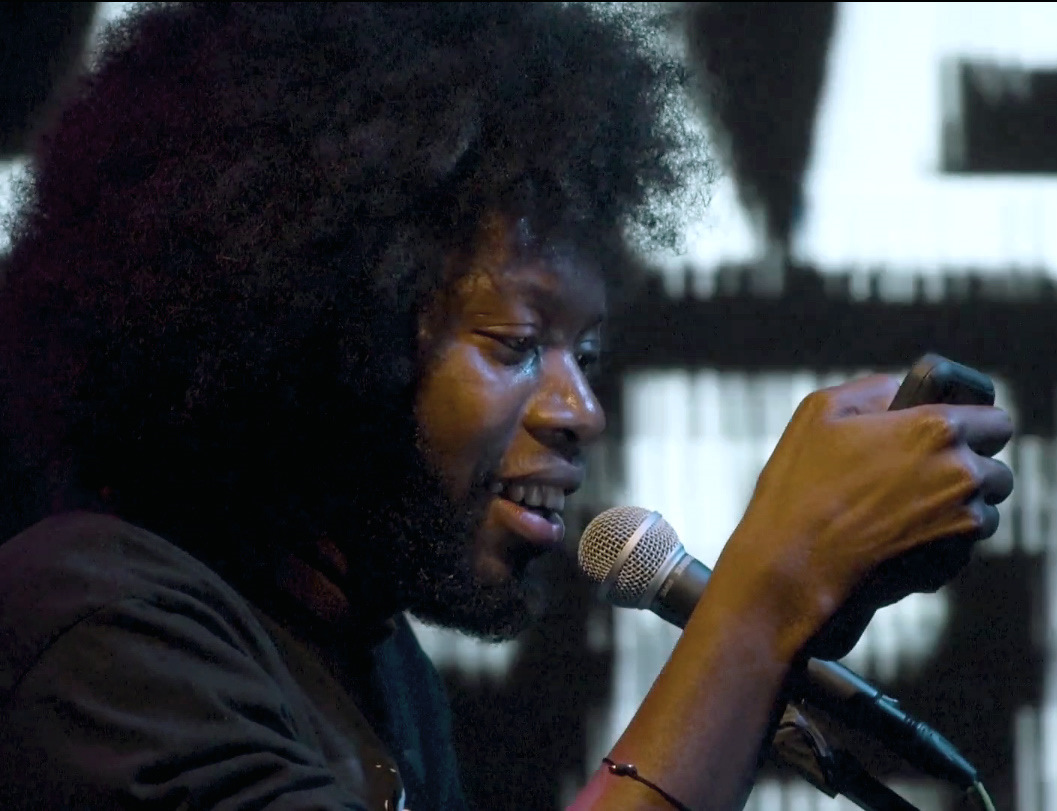
Author Jeremy O. Harris

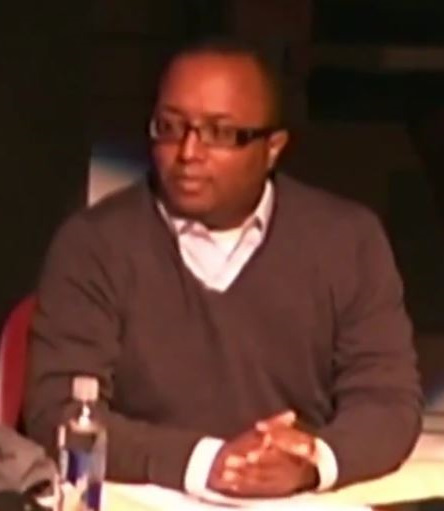
Director of New York Theatre Workshop and Broadway productions Robert O'Hara

Author Jeremy O. Harris has said that he wrote Slave Play during his first year at the Yale School of Drama, from which he graduated in 2019. In October 2017, a production of Slave Play was presented at the Yale School of Drama as part of the annual Langston Hughes Festival. The first workshop production was directed by Em Weinstein.

=== Off-Broadway (2018) ===
The play was announced for the 2018–2019 season of the New York Theatre Workshop (NYTW) and was taken into the development program of the National Playwrights Conference at the Eugene O'Neill Theater Center. Later that month, Robert O'Hara, who had known Harris since his brief studies at De Paul University and was one of his teachers at Yale, was announced as director. At the end of July 2018, the first public reading of the work was held at the conference.

Previews of the production at NYTW, under the patronage of the production company Seaview Productions, began on November 19, 2018. Due to high demand, the duration of the show's run was extended before the official December 9 premiere, with the final performance being postponed from the original closing date of December 30, 2018, to January 13, 2019. Over the next two weeks, tickets for all performances sold out.

=== Broadway (2019) ===
On September 18, 2019, the play ran and hosted a Broadway Blackout night where the audience consisted of only black identified artists, writers, or students. The play began its Broadway run at the John Golden Theatre in October 2019. The play opened its 17-week limited Broadway engagement on October 6, 2019, and closed as scheduled on January 19, 2020. Harris and his team promised that 10,000 tickets would be sold at $39 in an effort to diversify the crowd.

In June 2020, the producers and creative team of Slave Play made a donation of $10,000 (~$11,907 in 2024) to the National Bailout Fund and released a statement in support of Black Lives Matter.

=== Broadway remount (2021) ===
In September 2021, it was announced that a new engagement of the play will run at the August Wilson Theatre from November 23, 2021, to January 23, 2022, with plans to then transfer to Los Angeles. Most of the cast returned, with the exception of Joaquina Kalukango, due to a prior commitment to the pre-Broadway run of Paradise Square; she was replaced by Antoinette Crowe-Legacy, who originated the role of Kaneisha at the Yale School of Drama. The producers said they intended to repeat their previous efforts to sell 10,000 tickets for $39 each. The production later transferred to the Center Theatre Group's Mark Taper Forum in Los Angeles from February 9 to March 13, 2022, after plans to stage it in 2020 were delayed due to the COVID-19 pandemic.

=== West End (2024) ===
In February 2024, it was announced that the production would transfer to London's West End for a limited engagement. The show began performances 29 June 2024 at the Noël Coward Theatre and is scheduled to run through 21 September 2024. Appearing in the cast are Fisayo Akinade, Kit Harington, Aaron Heffernan, and Olivia Washington, alongside James Cusati-Moyer, Chalia La Tour, Annie McNamara, and Irene Sofia Lucio reprising their roles from the original Broadway production. "Black Out" nights return in this run, wherein two performances will be exclusively available for black-identifying audience members, facilitated through partnerships with outside organizations. Additionally, a select number of tickets will be reserved for each performance as pay-what-you-can, along with an additional selection of £20 tickets released each performance day.

== Roles and principal casts ==
Character	Off-Broadway	Broadway	Broadway Remount	Los Angeles	West End
Character	2018	2019	2021	2022	2024
Kaneisha	Teyonah Parris	Joaquina Kalukango	Antoinette Crowe-Legacy	Antoinette Crowe-Legacy	Olivia Washington
Jim	Paul Alexander Nolan	Paul Alexander Nolan	Paul Alexander Nolan	Paul Alexander Nolan	Kit Harington
Phillip	Sullivan Jones	Sullivan Jones	Jonathan Higginbotham	Jonathan Higginbotham	Aaron Heffernan
Alana	Annie McNamara	Annie McNamara	Annie McNamara	Elizabeth Stahlmann	Annie McNamara
Dustin	James Cusati-Moyer	James Cusati-Moyer	Devin Kawaoka	Devin Kawaoka	James Cusati-Moyer
Gary	Ato Blankson-Wood	Ato Blankson-Wood	Ato Blankson-Wood	Jakeem Dante Powell	Fisayo Akinade
Teá	Chalia La Tour	Chalia La Tour	Chalia La Tour	Chalia La Tour	Chalia La Tour
Patricia	Irene Sofia Lucio	Irene Sofia Lucio	Irene Sofia Lucio	Irene Sofia Lucio	Irene Sofia Lucio

== Reception ==
Critical reception of Slave Play has been polarized. Due to themes revolving around sexuality and slavery, reviewers have either defended the play or criticized it. In particular, Harris believes that making a play palatable would be buying into respectability politics, and reviewers such as Tim Teeman and Soraya Nadia McDonald have noted how Slave Play's explicit content is utilized to critique racism in the United States.

There have been petitions to shut down Slave Play because of its themes. In particular, audience members and writers have criticized the play for its treatment of Black women characters, and voicing that it disrespects the violent history of rape in chattel slavery. In 2018, a petition titled "Shutdown Slave Play" was started, with the petitioner describing the play as traumatizing and exploitative of human atrocities. Critic Elisabeth Vincentelli noted the similarities between the themes and style of Slave Play and those of the plays An Octoroon (2014) and Underground Railroad Game (2016).

Despite the controversy, many reviewers have met the play with acclaim. Peter Marks describes the play as funny and scalding, while Sara Holdren wrote that Harris manages to make every character an archetype while at the same giving them depth. Positive reviews of the play herald Slave Play as both confronting racism and unpacking the nuances of interracial relationships, and cite it as comedic and entertaining. Aisha Harris wrote about the experience of seeing Slave Play as a Black woman, stating that the uncomfortable narrative of the play allows for productive thought.

Other reviewers have reviewed the play negatively. Thom Geier reviewed the play as intentionally designed to provoke, and calls the play uneven. Juan Michael Porter II, a Black theater writer, reviewed the play as consisting of oversimplified confessions meant to titillate the audience.

=== Black out performances ===
The concept of the black out performance originated during the initial Broadway run of Slave Play. The performances were aimed at a Black or Black-identifying audience, including people of mixed race. The black out performances were replicated in the London run of the play which led to criticism by a spokesperson for the British Prime Minister Rishi Sunak that they were "wrong and divisive". Harris defended the idea on BBC Radio 4's The World At One, saying: "The idea of a Black Out night is to say: this is a night that we are specifically inviting black people to fill up the space, to feel safe with a lot of other black people in a place where they often do not feel safe. I think that one of the things that we have to remember is that people have to be radically invited into a space to know that they belong there. In most places in the West, poor people and black people have been told that they do not belong inside of the theatre."

== Awards and nominations ==
=== Original Off-Broadway production ===
Year	Award	Category	Nominee	Result
2019	Lucille Lortel Awards	Best Play		Nominated
2019	Lucille Lortel Awards	Outstanding Featured Actor in a Play	Ato Blankson-Wood	Nominated
2019	Drama Desk Award	Outstanding Lighting Design for a Play	Jiyoun Chang	Nominated
2019	Drama Desk Award	Outstanding Fight Choreography	Claire Warden	Won
2019	Outer Critics Circle Award	John Gassner Award	Jeremy O. Harris	Nominated

=== Original Broadway production ===
Year	Award	Category	Nominee	Result
2020	Tony Awards	Best Play		Nominated
2020	Tony Awards	Best Leading Actress in a Play	Joaquina Kalukango	Nominated
2020	Tony Awards	Best Featured Actor in a Play	Ato Blankson-Wood	Nominated
2020	Tony Awards	Best Featured Actor in a Play	James Cusati-Moyer	Nominated
2020	Tony Awards	Best Featured Actress in a Play	Chalia La Tour	Nominated
2020	Tony Awards	Best Featured Actress in a Play	Annie McNamara	Nominated
2020	Tony Awards	Best Direction of a Play	Robert O'Hara	Nominated
2020	Tony Awards	Best Original Score	Lindsay Jones	Nominated
2020	Tony Awards	Best Scenic Design of a Play	Clint Ramos	Nominated
2020	Tony Awards	Best Costume Design of a Play	Dede Ayite	Nominated
2020	Tony Awards	Best Lighting Design of a Play	Jiyoun Chang	Nominated
2020	Tony Awards	Best Sound Design of a Play	Lindsay Jones	Nominated
2020	Drama League Awards	Outstanding Production of a Play		Nominated
2020	Drama League Awards	Distinguished Performance Award	Ato Blankson-Wood	Nominated
2020	Outer Critics Circle Award	Outstanding Actress in a Play	Joaquina Kalukango	Honoree
2020	GLAAD Media Award	Outstanding Broadway Production		Nominated
