= Robert O'Hara =

American playwright

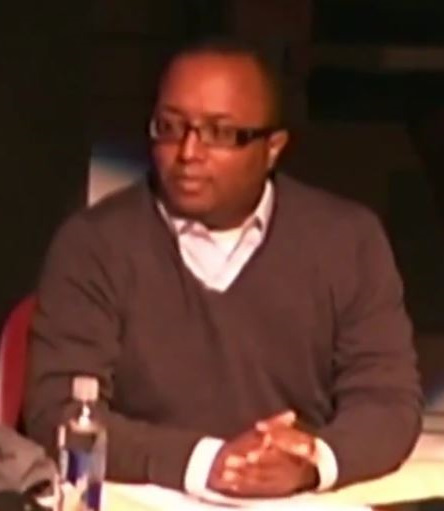
- Robert O'Hara in September 2014
- Born: c. 1970 (age 55–56); Cincinnati, Ohio, U.S.
- Education: Tufts University (BA); Columbia University (MFA)
- Occupations: Playwright; director
- Years active: 1996–present

Robert O'Hara (born c. 1970) is an American playwright and director. He has written Insurrection: Holding History and Bootycandy. Insurrection is a time traveling play exploring racial and sexual identity. Bootycandy is a series of comedic scenes primarily following the character of Sutter, a gay African American man growing from adolescence to manhood. It won the Lambda Literary Award for LGBT Drama. O’Hara was nominated for the 2020 Tony Award for Best Direction of a Play for his contribution to Slave Play.

== Early life and education ==
O'Hara was born in Cincinnati, Ohio. Growing up, he lived with his mother, who had him when she was seventeen, and his step-father, who moved in when O'Hara was twelve. In the third grade, he began attending Catholic school, where he found himself one of the few African-American students there. He attended Walnut Hills High School, a nationally recognized public academic magnet school in Cincinnati, where he was active in the theater program. He later attended Tufts University in Boston, and graduated in 1992. Initially he came to the school major in political science and become a lawyer. However, he quickly realized he was much more interested in theatre, and changed his major to drama. At Tufts he started the Tufts Black Theatre Company, for which he directed and wrote work. After graduating from Tufts, he then went on to pursue a master's degree in directing at Columbia University, which he completed in 1996. During his time at Columbia, O'Hara interned at the Manhattan Theatre Club and the Joseph Papp Public Theater, where he was mentored by notable African-American playwright George C. Wolfe, author of The Colored Museum.

== Career ==
=== Theatre ===
O'Hara is known throughout the theatre world for his career as a playwright and director.

In 2011 he became a company member at the Woolly Mammoth Theatre in Washington, D.C.

In 2013, O'Hara was one of 14 people awarded a playwright residency grant from the Andrew W. Mellon Foundation, and was Woolly Mammoth's playwright in residence from 2013 to 2015.

In October 2020, O’Hara was nominated for a Tony Award for Best Direction of a Play for his direction of Slave Play.

O'Hara was featured in the 2022 book 50 Key Figures in Queer US Theatre, with a profile written by theatre scholar Faedra Chatard Carpenter.

=== Film ===
In the mid-nineties, O'Hara wrote the script to a Richard Pryor biopic called Live that was to be directed by Martin Scorsese. However, the project remained trapped in development and has yet to be made.

O'Hara also wrote the script to Micheaux, a biopic following the life of African-American filmmaker Oscar Micheaux that was to be directed by Spike Lee.

In 2011, O'Hara made his film directing debut with the Horror/Thriller film The Inheritance, which he also wrote. The film follows the story of a group of cousins who meet to receive their ancestors inheritance, but discover a deadly secret instead.

== Notable works ==
=== Insurrection: Holding History ===
Insurrection: Holding History follows the story of a young, gay African-American man named Ron, who travels back in time with his 189-year-old grandfather to the time of the Nat Turner's Rebellion. The play deals with themes of racial identity and sexuality, as Ron comes to face his ancestors' history, and his own personal identity.

Insurrection was written during O'Hara's time interning at the Public Theatre. It was selected as a part of the 1995 new work reading series at the Mark Taper Forum, and O'Hara later directed it as a part of his Master's thesis at Columbia in April of that year. His student production of the play garnered much attention, and helped to get O'Hara's work noticed by the New York theatre community. In 1996, the play won Newsday's Oppenheimer Award for Best New American Play.

The play officially opened at the Public Theatre on October 11, 1996, and was produced by O'Hara's former mentor George C. Wolfe.

=== Brave Blood ===
Brave Blood takes place in the home of Ms. Anne, a psychiatrist who takes in a group of female prostitutes in order to help better their lives. However, when a murder occurs, the investigation throws the house into chaos. The play deals with themes of how exploitation affects identity.

O'Hara directed the play's premiere in 2001 at the Transparent Theatre Company in Berkeley, California.

=== -14: An American Maul ===
-14: An American Maul takes place in a future America where a new form of cotton is created that requires manual labor to be grown and picked. As a result, the President repeals the Fourteenth Amendment, and effectively reinstates slavery.

The play was produced during O'Hara's residence at the American Conservatory Theater.

=== Antebellum ===
Antebellum focuses on themes of social injustice as it intercuts between two alternate stories throughout the play: one which takes place in Atlanta in 1939, the other in Germany in 1936. The Atlanta plot-line centers on a young Jewish couple living in the South who dress up in Civil War era attire to attend the premiere of Gone with the Wind. In Berlin, a Third Reich officer at a Nazi death camp is in love with his prisoner, a black, male cabaret performer, yet still allows him to be tortured.

The play premiered at the Woolly Mammoth Theatre in Washington, D.C., on March 30, 2009.

=== The Etiquette of Vigilance ===
The Etiquette of Vigilance is a contemporary re-imagining of Lorraine Hansberry's 1959 play A Raisin in the Sun. It follows the story of Travis, the youngest male of the Younger family original play, and his daughter Lorraine, who is about to become the first of her family to enter college, and feels the pressure of her family's longheld desire to achieve the American Dream.

The play premiere at the Steppenwolf Theatre in Chicago on October 22, 2010.

=== Bootycandy ===
BootyCandy is a series of interconnected vignettes, often comedic and satirical, that explore themes of what it means to be a black gay man in America. Originally written as twelve separate short plays, O'Hara eventually wove them together into one play, bringing the character of Sutter out as the through line through most of the smaller scenes. O'Hara has said that while the play is in many ways autobiographical and the character of Sutter particularly mirrors his own experiences, it doesn't necessarily tell the exact story of his own life.

The play premiered at the Woolly Mammoth Theatre in Washington, D.C., on May 30, 2011. It then moved to Playwrights Horizons Theater Company from August 22 through October 19, 2014. Here, it won the Obie Award's Special Citation shared between O'Hara and actors Philip James Brannon, Jessica Frances Dukes, Jesse Pennington, Benja Kay Thomas, and Lance Coadie Williams.

Two of the vignettes from BootyCandy – Dreaming in Church and Genitalia were developed and produced by Worth Street Theater Company at The Tribeca Playhouse as part of theirSnapshots 2000 series. Worth Street's artistic director Jeff Cohen was the director. Bruce Weber of The New York Times wrote: “Dreamin’ In Church is a comic monologue delivered from the pulpit of a black church. (It is) a carefully constructed piece with a warning against rumormongering – there are gays in the church choir, it is said – and mounts to its own joyous confession. Mr. O’Hara, who is black, is a promising and energetic playwright with a healthy sense of the comic possibilities of bigotry and racial stereotypes. He has a second offering here as well, a jokey skit in Wayans brothers’ mode about black women talking on the phone about the decision by one of them to name her baby Genitalia. In ”Dreamin" Mr. O’Hara shows off a gift for deft pacing, withholding the comic underpinnings of the story just long enough. Performed by Derek Lively with fervent, singsong mischief the monologue ends up thundering on some obvious points and once Mr. Lively strips off his robe to disclose his own secret his delivery is hilarious.”

=== Barbecue ===
Barbecue centers on around the O'Mallerys, a dysfunctional group of siblings who come together for a park barbeque in order to stage an emergency intervention for their sister Barbara, whose drug habit has gotten out of hand. However, there are in fact two O'Mallery families, one white and one black. Each appear in different, yet similar scenes that juxtapose to create a dialogue about racial and family politics.

The play premiered at the Public Theatre in New York, NY on September 22, 2015.

Barbecue was produced by Intiman Theatre at the Langston Hughes Performing Arts Institute, Seattle WA in June 2017.

== Critical reception ==
O'Hara's work has often received polarized reviews from critics; he is often praised for his bold and daring themes, yet criticized in the execution of them. Considering his first play Insurrection, Variety critic Greg Evans found O'Hara's work to be "a fanciful study in Black history that announc[ed] O'Hara as a promising new voice," yet only "partially successful" in performance. New York Times theatre critic Peter Marks had a similar reaction in his review as he stated the play was "clever" yet "all over" the map. Both reviews criticized O'Hara's choice to act as his own director, which he continues to do for many of his plays.

Marks also reviewed O'Hara's play Antebellum in 2009, and felt that while the show had a "rich, imaginatively expressive intelligence," overall it was "overthought" and "garish." News Herald reporter Bob Abelman had a similar take on the show, which he found to be a "brilliant concept" but "by the end of the night is gone with the wind."

In contrast, O'Hara's play Bootycandy received a wide variety of positive reviews. New York Times theatre critic Charles Isherwood named it a "Critic's Pick" at the time of its New York premiere, and described it to be "as raw in its language and raucous in spirit as it is smart and provocative." Isherwood also praised O'Hara's ability to alternate between moments of comedy and drama as he stated that "as funny as he can be when writing in ribald ′In Living Color′ sketch-comedy mode, Mr. O’Hara also reveals a more probing intelligence in the more serious scenes" of the play. LA Times theatre critic Charles McNulty praised O'Hara for "grappl[ing] with the conflicts and contradictions inherent in being a member of more than one oppressed group" and "tackling the challenge of writing about this experience in a culture that expects its minority playwrights to follow paths prescribed by white institutions" within his work.

== Personal life ==
He is openly gay.

== Awards ==
Year	Award title	Category	Play
1996	Oppenheimer Award	Best New American Play	Insurrection: Holding History
2006	Obie Award	Special Citations	In the Continuum
2010	NAACP Award	Best Director	Eclipsed
2010	Helen Hayes Award	Outstanding New Play	Antebellum
2014	P.T. Barnum Award	From Ballou to Broadway	N/A
2015	Lambda Literary Award	LGBT Drama	Bootycandy
2020	Tony Award (nominated)	Best Direction of a Play	Slave Play
