= 35th Independent Spirit Awards =

US film awards ceremony in 2020

- Awarded for: Best in independent film
- Date: February 8, 2020
- Site: Santa Monica Pier; Santa Monica, California, U.S.
- Hosted by: Aubrey Plaza

Highlights
- Best Feature: The Farewell
- Most awards: Uncut Gems (3)
- Most nominations: The Lighthouse (5); Uncut Gems (5)

Television coverage
- Channel: IFC

The 35th Film Independent Spirit Awards, honoring the best independent films of 2019, were presented by Film Independent on February 8, 2020. The nominations were announced on November 21, 2019 by actresses Zazie Beetz and Natasha Lyonne. The ceremony was televised in the United States by IFC, taking place inside its usual tent setting on a beach in Santa Monica, California. Aubrey Plaza returned to host the ceremony for the second time.

== Winners and nominees ==
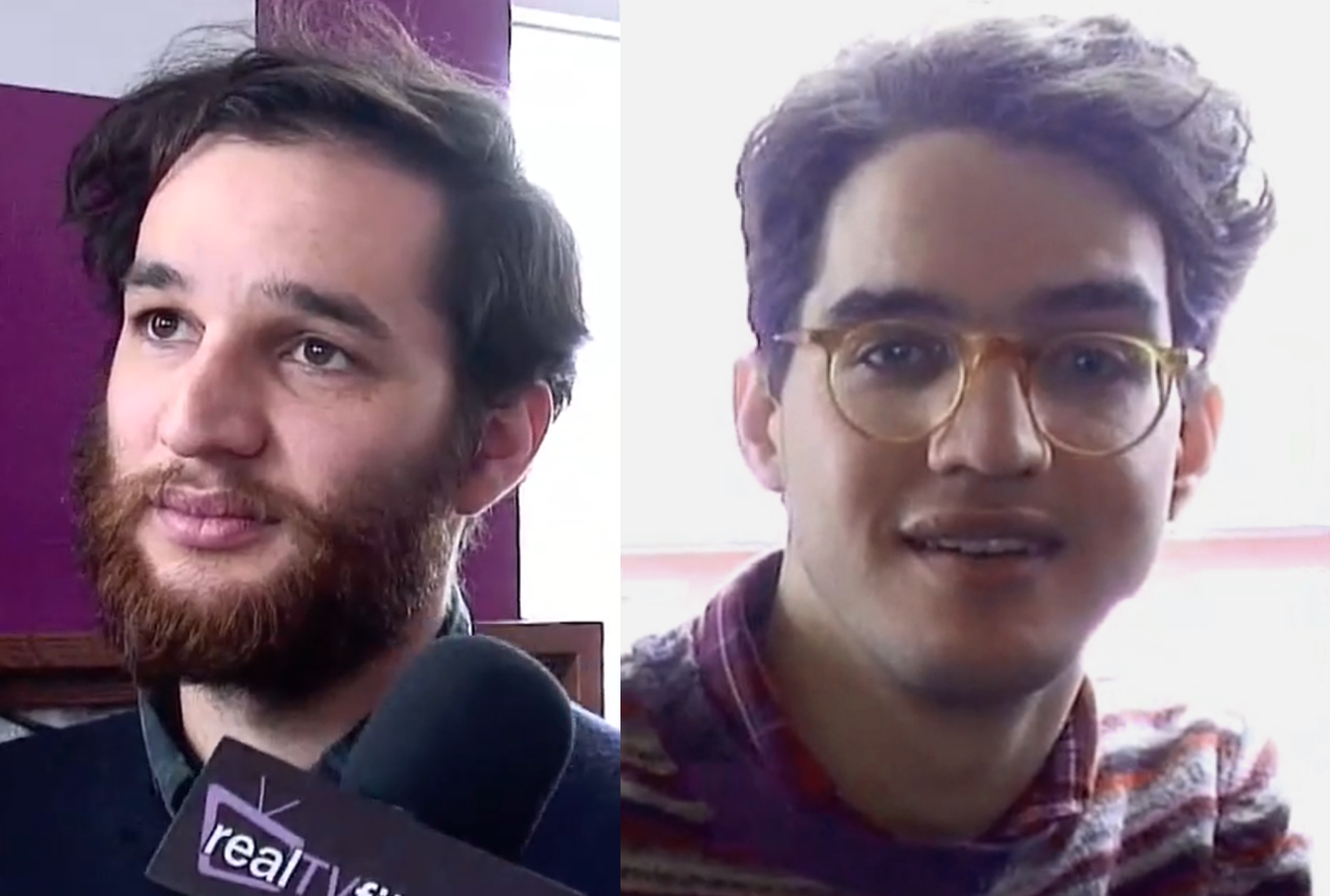
Josh Safdie and Benny Safdie, Best Director winners

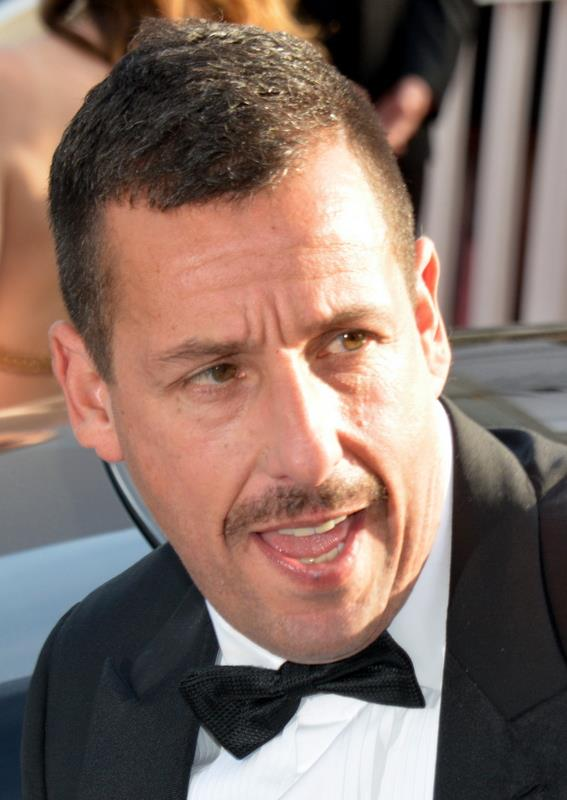
Adam Sandler, Best Male Lead winner

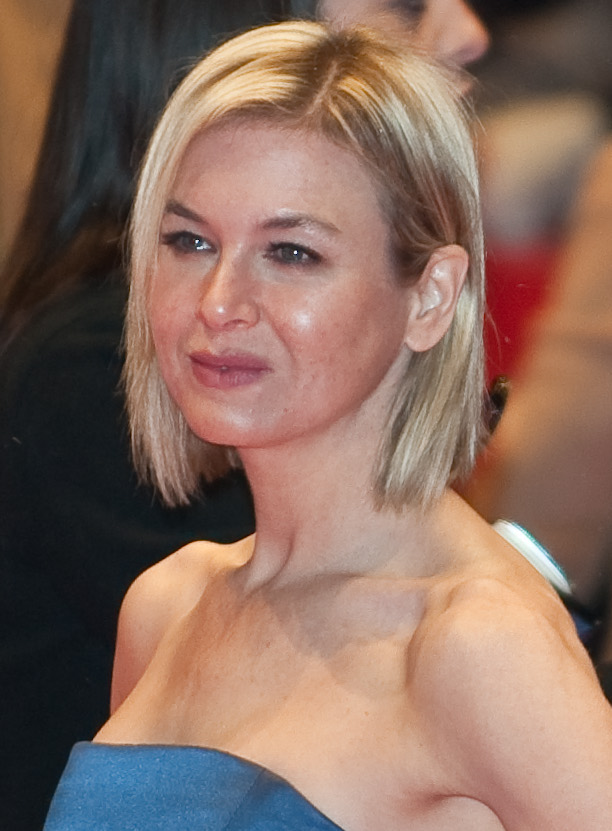
Renée Zellweger, Best Female Lead winner

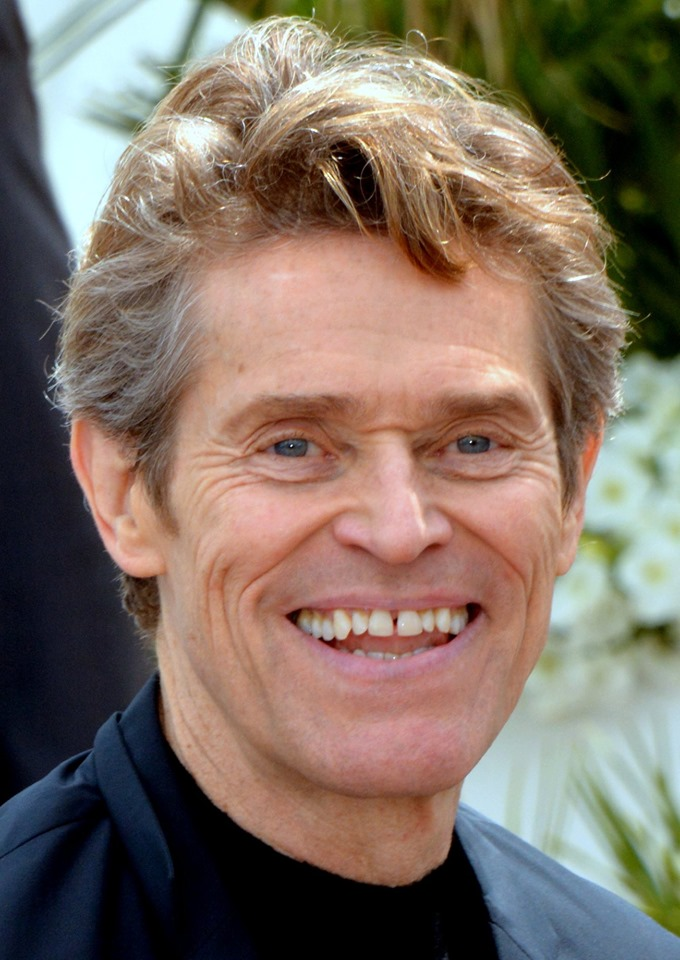
Willem Dafoe, Best Supporting Male winner

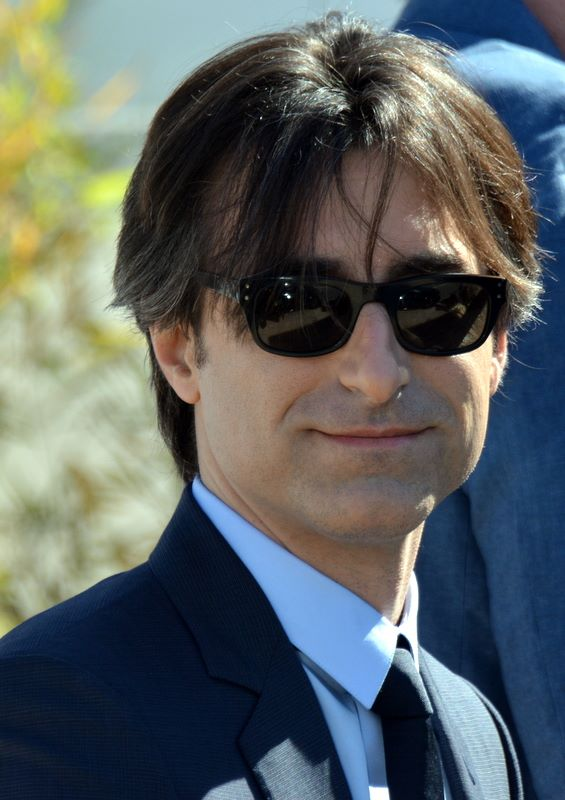
Noah Baumbach, Best Screenplay winner

Best Feature	Best Director
The Farewell: Clemency; A Hidden Life; Marriage Story; Uncut Gems	Josh Safdie and Benny Safdie – Uncut Gems: Robert Eggers – The Lighthouse; Alma Har'el – Honey Boy; Julius Onah – Luce; Lorene Scafaria – Hustlers
Best Male Lead	Best Female Lead
Adam Sandler – Uncut Gems as Howard Ratner: Chris Galust – Give Me Liberty as Vic; Kelvin Harrison Jr. – Luce as Luce Edgar; Robert Pattinson – The Lighthouse as Ephraim Winslow; Matthias Schoenaerts – The Mustang as Roman Coleman	Renée Zellweger – Judy as Judy Garland: Karen Allen – Colewell as Nora Pancowski; Hong Chau – Driveways as Kathy; Elisabeth Moss – Her Smell as Becky Something; Mary Kay Place – Diane as Diane; Alfre Woodard – Clemency as Bernadine Williams
Best Supporting Male	Best Supporting Female
Willem Dafoe – The Lighthouse as Thomas Wake: Noah Jupe – Honey Boy as Otis Lort; Shia LaBeouf – Honey Boy as James Lort; Jonathan Majors – The Last Black Man in San Francisco as Montgomery "Mont" Allen; Wendell Pierce – Burning Cane as Reverend Tillman	Zhao Shu-zhen – The Farewell as Nai Nai: Jennifer Lopez – Hustlers as Ramona Vega; Taylor Russell – Waves as Emily Williams; Lauren "Lolo" Spencer – Give Me Liberty as Tracy; Octavia Spencer – Luce as Harriet Wilson
Best Screenplay	Best First Screenplay
Noah Baumbach – Marriage Story: Jason Begue and Shawn Snyder – To Dust; Ronald Bronstein, Josh Safdie, and Benny Safdie – Uncut Gems; Chinonye Chukwu – Clemency; Tarell Alvin McCraney – High Flying Bird	Fredrica Bailey and Stefon Bristol – See You Yesterday: Hannah Bos and Paul Thureen – Driveways; Bridget Savage Cole and Danielle Krudy – Blow the Man Down; Jocelyn DeBoer and Dawn Luebbe – Greener Grass; James Montague and Craig W. Sanger – The Vast of Night
Best First Feature	Best Documentary Feature
Olivia Wilde – Booksmart: Stefon Bristol – See You Yesterday; Michael Angelo Covino – The Climb; Laure de Clermont-Tonnerre – The Mustang; Kent Jones – Diane; Joe Talbot – The Last Black Man in San Francisco	American Factory: Apollo 11; For Sama; Honeyland; Island of the Hungry Ghosts
Best Cinematography	Best Editing
Jarin Blaschke – The Lighthouse: Todd Banhazl – Hustlers; Natasha Braier – Honey Boy; Chananun Chotrungroj – The Third Wife; Pawel Pogorzelski – Midsommar	Ronald Bronstein and Benny Safdie – Uncut Gems: Julie Béziau – The Third Wife; Tyler L. Cook – Sword of Trust; Louise Ford – The Lighthouse; Kirill Mikhanovsky – Give Me Liberty
Best International Film
Parasite (South Korea): The Invisible Life of Eurídice Gusmão (Brazil); Les Misérables (France); Portrait of a Lady on Fire (France); Retablo (Peru); The Souvenir (United Kingdom)

=== Films with multiple nominations and awards ===
Films that received multiple nominations
Nominations	Film
5	The Lighthouse
5	Uncut Gems
4	Give Me Liberty
4	Honey Boy
3	Clemency
3	Hustlers
3	The Last Black Man in San Francisco
3	Luce
3	Marriage Story
3	The Third Wife
2	Burning Cane
2	Colewell
2	Diane
2	Driveways
2	The Farewell
2	The Mustang
2	Premature
2	See You Yesterday

Films that won multiple awards
Awards	Film
3	Uncut Gems
2	The Farewell
2	The Lighthouse
2	Marriage Story

== Special awards ==
=== John Cassavetes Award ===
Give Me Liberty

- Burning Cane
- Colewell
- Premature
- Wild Nights with Emily

=== Robert Altman Award ===
(The award is given to its film director, casting director, and ensemble cast)

- Marriage Story – Noah Baumbach, Douglas Aibel, Francine Maisler, Alan Alda, Laura Dern, Adam Driver, Julie Hagerty, Scarlett Johansson, Ray Liotta, Azhy Robertson, and Merritt Wever

=== Someone to Watch Award ===
Recognizes a talented filmmaker of singular vision who has not yet received appropriate recognition. The award includes a $25,000 unrestricted grant funded by Kiehl's.

- Rashaad Ernesto Green – Premature
  - Ash Mayfair – The Third Wife
  - Joe Talbot – The Last Black Man in San Francisco

=== The BONNIE Award ===
Recognizes mid-career women directors with a body of work that demonstrates uniqueness of vision and a groundbreaking approach to film making. The award includes a $50,000 unrestricted grant funded by American Airlines.

- Kelly Reichardt
  - Marielle Heller
  - Lulu Wang

=== Producers Award ===
Honors emerging producers who, despite highly limited resources, demonstrate the creativity, tenacity and vision required to produce quality, independent films. The award includes a $25,000 unrestricted grant funded by Piaget.

- Mollye Asher
  - Krista Parris
  - Ryan Zacarias

=== Truer than Fiction Award ===
Presented to an emerging director of non-fiction features who has not yet received significant recognition. The award includes a $25,000 unrestricted grant.

- Nadia Shihab – Jaddoland
  - Khalik Allah – Black Mother
  - Davy Rothbart – 17 Blocks
  - Erick Stoll and Chase Whiteside – América

== See also ==
- 92nd Academy Awards
- 77th Golden Globe Awards
- 73rd British Academy Film Awards
- 40th Golden Raspberry Awards
- 26th Screen Actors Guild Awards
- 25th Critics' Choice Awards
