= The Glass Menagerie (1950 film) =

1950 film

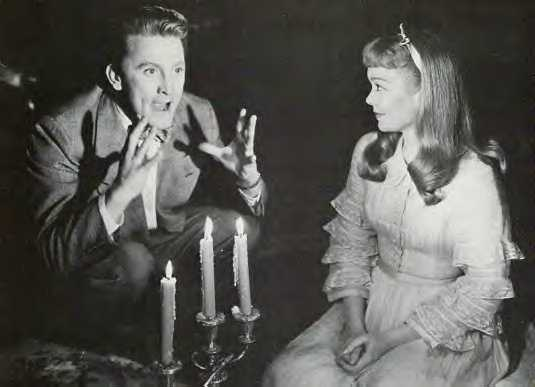
- Kirk Douglas and Jane Wyman in the film's trailer
- Directed by: Irving Rapper
- Screenplay by: Peter Berneis; Tennessee Williams
- Based on: The Glass Menagerie by Tennessee Williams
- Produced by: Charles K. Feldman; Jerry Wald
- Starring: Jane Wyman; Kirk Douglas; Gertrude Lawrence; Arthur Kennedy
- Cinematography: Robert Burks
- Edited by: David Weisbart
- Music by: Max Steiner
- Distributed by: Warner Bros. Pictures
- Release date: September 28, 1950
- Running time: 107 minutes
- Country: United States
- Language: English
- Budget: US$1,357,000 or $1,179,500
- Box office: $1.6 million

The Glass Menagerie is a 1950 American drama film directed by Irving Rapper. The screenplay by Tennessee Williams and Peter Berneis is based on the 1944 Williams play of the same title. It was the first of his plays to be adapted for the screen.

== Plot ==
While on duty, Merchant Mariner Tom Wingfield recalls his life in a dilapidated St. Louis apartment with his delusional mother Amanda and crippled younger sister Laura, and their story unfolds via flashback.

Abandoned by her husband, Amanda is forced to sell magazine subscriptions, but still considers herself superior to her working class neighbors. Concerned about her daughter, a shy loner who is training to be a secretary, but whose real interest is her collection of glass animal figurines, Amanda urges Tom to bring home a friend who might be interested in dating his sister. He finally relents and invites Jim O'Connor to dinner.

Amanda is thrilled that her daughter finally will have a "gentleman caller" courting her. Determined to make a good first impression, she makes elaborate preparations for the meal, but complications arise when Laura learns the name of their expected guest, a boy she recalls was one of the most popular in high school. Feigning illness, she initially refuses to join everyone at the dinner table, but eventually Amanda encourages her to join the group, then arranges for Laura and Jim to be alone. Realizing she suffers from an inferiority complex, he draws her out of her shell by expressing interest in her collection and then persuading her to dance with him. Stumbling, Laura causes a glass unicorn to fall to the floor and lose its horn. At first upset by the damage, she realizes the loss of the horn makes the unicorn more like the horses and therefore less noticeable, as she feels she herself is because of her pronounced limp.

Jim suggests he and Laura go to the Paradise Ballroom, and Amanda is delighted, until he mentions he is engaged to a woman named Betty. Laura gives him the broken unicorn and invites him to return some day with his fiancée, but after he leaves, her devastated mother berates Tom for raising her hopes. Laura is more understanding and reminds her brother she loves him. Seemingly free of her limp and brimming with self-confidence, Laura awaits a visit from another "gentleman caller" in an upbeat ending that deviates from the play.

== Cast ==
- Gertrude Lawrence as Amanda Wingfield
- Jane Wyman as Laura Wingfield
- Kirk Douglas as Jim O'Connor
- Arthur Kennedy as Tom Wingfield

== Production ==
Film rights were bought by Charles K. Feldman for $200,000 plus a percentage of the profits. The project was set up at Warner Bros. Pictures. In 1950 it was reported Feldman would pay Williams $375,000 for the rights over ten years at $37,500 a year. Irvin Rapper was paid $50,000. Of the final budget of $1,179,000 Warners, contributed $968,000 and Feldman the rest.

=== Casting ===
Irving Rapper later said Williams "hated the cast we had in the picture. I always thought we should have cast unknown people." Producer Charles K. Feldman originally wanted Jeanne Crain and Ethel Barrymore for the roles of Laura and Amanda. Gene Tierney, Montgomery Clift, Marlon Brando, Tallulah Bankhead, Miriam Hopkins, and Ralph Meeker also were considered for the film. In May 1949 Variety announced that Jane Wyman was cast as Laura and that the leading contenders for Amanda were Miriam Hopkins, Fay Bainter, Ruth Chatterton, Irene Dunne and Ethel Barrymore. Warner Bros had considered Helen Hayes and Kathere Cornell but both had turned down the role.

Bankhead was Irving Rapper's first choice, he wrote of her screen test: "I was absolutely floored by her performance. It's the greatest test I've ever made or seen in my life. I couldn't believe I was seeing such reality. Bankhead was absolutely natural, so moving, so touching without even trying." However, Jack Warner had suffered because of Errol Flynn's bouts of alcohol abuse, and he feared the same problems from Tallulah (also an alcoholic), and for this reason decided not to sign her. According to internal memos at Warner Bros, however, Bankhead was drunk on the last day of her test (which she did with Ralph Meeker.)

Rapper wanted Bette Davis but she had just left Warner Bros and Jack Warner did not want her. Rapper later claimed "Gertrude Lawrence never understood what she was playing. Arthur Kennedy was the only cast member I wanted."

The first script was written by Norman Corwin, but only Tennessee Williams and Peter Berneis received credit for the screenplay. Despite the fact Williams had an active hand in bringing his play to the screen, he was unhappy with the outcome, calling the casting of Gertrude Lawrence as Amanda "a dismal error" and the overall film a "dishonest" adaptation of his work.

=== Music ===
In the scene in which Laura helps Tom get into bed, "Someone to Watch Over Me" is used as the underscore. The song, written by George and Ira Gershwin, was introduced by Gertrude Lawrence in Oh, Kay! in 1926.

== Other versions ==
Jane Wyman reprised her role opposite Fay Bainter as Amanda in a Lux Radio Theatre broadcast on March 8, 1954. The play later was adapted twice for television, in 1966 with Shirley Booth, Barbara Loden, Pat Hingle, and Hal Holbrook, and in 1973 with Katharine Hepburn, Joanna Miles, Sam Waterston, and Michael Moriarty. In 1987, Paul Newman directed a feature film remake starring Joanne Woodward, John Malkovich, Karen Allen, and James Naughton.

== Box office ==
The film was a minor box office success making $1.6 million in rentals.

== Critical reception ==
Variety wrote, "Customer demands for thing different will be fulfilled in spades by The Glass Menagerie. Project that skyrocketed Tennessee Williams to the topmost dramatist brackets has been beautifully celluloided by Warners. Arty it is, unquestionably, but in a down-to-earth style that results in complete audience identification."

Bosley Crowther of The New York Times said the film "comes perilously close to sheer buffoonery in some of its most fragile scenes. And this makes for painful diffusion of the play's obvious poignancy." He added, "Apparently, Mr. Williams . . . was persuaded to 'fatten' the role of the faded and fatuous mother to suit the talents of Gertrude Lawrence . . . well known as an actress with a brilliant and devastating flair for brittle high comedy and satire, preferably Noël Coward style. So presumably it was considered advisable to give her a chance to play the old belle in this drama with a list towards the lady's comic side. If such was the story-conference reasoning, it was woefully unfortunate, for the mother . . . is the fatal weakness of the film . . . Miss Lawrence and the screenplay make her a farcically exaggerated shrew with the zeal of a burlesque comedian to see her diffident daughter wed . . . Furthermore, it must be mentioned that the Southern accent which Miss Lawrence affects is not only disturbingly erratic but it has an occasional Cockney strain. The character is sufficiently murky without this additional mystery. As much as we hate to say so, Miss Lawrence's performance does not compare with the tender and radiant creation of the late Laurette Taylor on the stage. On the other hand, modest Jane Wyman is beautifully sensitive in the role of the crippled and timid daughter who finds escape in her menagerie of glass, and Arthur Kennedy is intriguingly caustic as the incredibly long-suffering son. Kirk Douglas is appropriately shallow as the young man who comes to call. They all do very nicely by Mr. Williams' electric scenes and lines. That is to say, they do nicely when the script and the direction permit—and that is to say when Miss Lawrence is not overwhelming the screen. It is regrettable that Director Irving Rapper was compelled, it appears, to kick around the substance of a frail, illusory drama as though it were plastic and not Venetian glass."

TV Guide rated the film three out of four stars and commented, "This bittersweet, delicate story is handled with care by director Rapper, but the accent is placed more on laughs than on pensive study, which somewhat weakens the play's original intent. Burks' fluid camera, however, avoids a stagey look to the production." Filmink called the ending "totally contrary to the point of the play" and hypothesized this was why the movie was not a commercial success.
