= Colewell =

2019 film by Tom Quinn

- Directed by: Tom Quinn
- Written by: Tom Quinn
- Produced by: Joshua Blum; Alexandra Byer; Craig Shilowich; Matthew Thurm
- Starring: Karen Allen; Kevin J. O'Connor; Hannah Gross
- Cinematography: Paul Yee
- Edited by: Darrin Navarro; Tom Quinn
- Music by: Dara Taylor
- Production companies: Washington Square Films; Three Martinis Club; Wavelength Productions; Clara Pictures
- Distributed by: Gravitas Ventures
- Release dates: April 13, 2019 (SFIFF); December 13, 2019 (United States)
- Running time: 79 minutes
- Country: United States
- Language: English

Colewell is a 2019 American drama film written, directed, and co-edited by Tom Quinn. It stars Karen Allen as a rural postmaster who struggles to find purpose when her office is suddenly closed and she is faced with retirement. Kevin J. O'Connor and Hannah Gross appear in supporting roles.

The film had its world premiere at the 62nd San Francisco International Film Festival on April 13, 2019. It was simultaneously released in limited theaters and on DVD, Blu-ray, and video on demand on December 13, 2019, by Gravitas Ventures. It received positive reviews from critics, who mostly praised Allen's performance. At the 35th Independent Spirit Awards, the film was nominated for Best Female Lead (for Allen) and the John Cassavetes Award.

== Synopsis ==
Colewell stars Karen Allen as Nora Pancowski, a 65-year-old postmaster in rural Colewell, Pennsylvania, who has operated the town's post office from her home for 35 years. When the United States Postal Service announces the closure of her office, Nora faces an agonizing choice: accept a transfer to Delaney, a larger town requiring a daily bus commute, or take early retirement and risk isolation in her beloved but fading community.

The film explores themes of aging, community dissolution, and resistance to change through Nora's daily routines and interactions with townspeople who rely on the post office as their social hub. As she grapples with her decision, Nora encounters Ella (Hannah Gross), a young hitchhiker whose presence serves as an enigmatic counterpoint to Nora's settled life, possibly representing her younger self or unfulfilled dreams of travel and freedom. Kevin J. O’Connor co-stars as Charles, a mail truck driver and Nora's closest companion. Set against the backdrop of rural America's economic decline, the film presents a meditation on how institutional changes affect individual lives and small communities. Through Quinn's restrained direction and Allen's nuanced performance, Colewell captures the quiet tragedy of a woman whose identity is inseparable from her work and community, both of which are being systematically dismantled by forces beyond her control.

== Cast ==
- Karen Allen as Nora Pancowski
- Kevin J. O'Connor as Charles
- Hannah Gross as Ella
- Daniel Jenkins as Al Catarro
- Craig Walker as Bob Susskind
- Malachy Cleary as Gray
- Catherine Kellner as Claire
- Tobias Segal as Andy
- Cathie Pauley as Pete
- Bonnie Klein as Delores
- Juney Smith as Anthony

== Release ==
The film premiered at the San Francisco International Film Festival on April 13, 2019.

== Reception ==
=== Critical response ===
On the review aggregator website Rotten Tomatoes, 100% of 9 critics' reviews are positive, with an average rating of 7.7/10. Metacritic, which uses a weighted average, assigned the film a score of 73 out of 100, based on 5 critics, indicating "generally favorable" reviews.

Nick Schager of Variety stated, "Colewell is a character study that's almost too subdued for its own good. Fortunately, writer-director Tom Quinn has a keen eye for telling details, as well as a superb lead actress in Karen Allen." Schager also commented that "the film's finely crafted serenity is in keeping with its main character's secluded state of affairs, and mind." Stephen Farber of The Hollywood Reporter opined, "Unlike many movies shot in places far from where they are meant to take place, this one has an authenticity that makes a noticeable difference. Although Colewell could have benefited from pruning away some of its eccentricities, it pays eloquent tribute to a woman who fights against a life erased." Carlos Aguilar of the Los Angeles Times called the film "a drama as endearingly demure as its leading lady." Aguilar highlighted Allen's performance, writing that "Colewell finally granted her the platform for the most remarkable onscreen rendition of her career. Contemplative, her longing stare extends beyond the nearby fields and into the past."

=== Accolades ===
| Year | Award | Category | Recipient(s) | Result | Ref. |
|---|---|---|---|---|---|
| 2019 | 10th Hollywood Music in Media Awards | Best Original Score in an Independent Film | Dara Taylor | Won | |
| 2020 | 35th Independent Spirit Awards | John Cassavetes Award | Tom Quinn, Joshua Blum, Alexandra Byer, Craig Shilowich, Matthew Thurm | Nominated | |
| 2020 | 35th Independent Spirit Awards | Best Female Lead | Karen Allen | Nominated | |
| 2020 | 26th Chlotrudis Awards | Best Actress | Karen Allen | Nominated | |
