= Alvin Epstein =

American actor (1925–2018)

Alvin Epstein (May 14, 1925 – December 10, 2018) was an American actor and director. He was a founding member of both the American Repertory Theater and Yale Repertory Theatre. He was particularly admired for his performances in the plays of Samuel Beckett. He also served as Artistic Director at the Guthrie Theater.

== Life and career ==
Born in the Bronx, Epstein was the son of Harry Epstein, a physician, and his wife Goldie Epstein (née Rudnick). He graduated from the High School of Music & Art in Manhattan and the Queens College, City University of New York. After serving in the United States Army during World War II in Germany, he studied dance in New York with Martha Graham and mime in Paris. His early performances in New York City included appearing in mimes with Marcel Marceau. In 1956 he made his Broadway debut as the Fool in Orson Welles’ 1956 production of William Shakespeare's King Lear. That same year he portrayed the slave Lucky in the Broadway premiere of Beckett’s Waiting for Godot.

Epstein continued to appear in many productions of Beckett's plays, including Clov, the servant, in the United States premiere of Endgame in 1958. He portrayed two more characters in that play during his career: Hamm, Clov’s tyrannical blind master, in a 1984 Off-Broadway production that he also directed, at the Samuel Beckett Theater; and Hamm’s aged father, Nagg, who lives in a garbage can, performed at the Irish Repertory Theatre in Manhattan in 2005 and again, in 2008, at the Brooklyn Academy of Music.

== Credits ==
=== Film ===
Movies
Year	Title	Role
1976	Everybody Rides the Carousel	Narrator
1991	Beauty and the Beast	Bookseller
1991	Age Isn't Everything	
1996	Never Met Picasso	Uncle Alfred
2002	Alma Mater	Leonard Carver
2003	Psychoanalysis Changed My Life	Otto Zurmer
2004	Beacon Hill	Preston Brooks
2008	Synecdoche, New York	Man With Nose Bleed
2008	We Pedal Uphill	Mortimer
2013	Young(ish)	Old Man
2014	Engram	Old Man
2016	Year by the Sea	Erik Erikson

=== Television ===
Year	Title	Role	Notes
1956	Omnibus		Segment: Androcles and the Lion
1959	The Further Adventures of Ellery Queen	Elwood Parker	Episode: "The Paper Tigers"
1960	Armstrong Circle Theatre	Reinhard Heydrich	Episode: "Engineer of Death: The Eichmann Story"
1961	Naked City	Elliot Kesbek	Episode: "The Fault In Our Stars"
1961	Play of the Week	Lucky	Episode: "Waiting for Godot"
1961	Play of the Week	Camille	Episode: "Therese Raquin"
1961	Great Ghost Tales	Dr. Kaplan	Episode: "Who Is the Fairest One of All?"
1963	The Doctors	Philip Manning	
1964	Mr. Broadway	Chauvigny	Episode: "Maggie, Queen of the Jungle"
1969	NET Playhouse	Ensemble Member	Episode: Story Theatre
1986	Doing Life	Lou Rosenberg	
1990	Law & Order	Dr. Chester	Episode: "Prescription for Death"
2004	Law & Order	Stuart Rubin	Episode: "City Hall"
2012	Law & Order: Special Victims Unit	Harold Lassiter	Episode: "Lessons Learned"
2015	My America	Elderly Veteran	Episode: "Roosevelt Island"
