= Independent Spirit Award for Best First Screenplay =

Annual US film award

- Awarded for: Best First Screenplay
- Country: United States
- Presented by: Film Independent
- First award: 1994
- Currently held by: Alex Russell for Lurker (2025)
- Website: www.filmindependent.org

The Independent Spirit Award for Best First Screenplay is one of the annual awards given by the Film Independent, a non-profit organization dedicated to independent film and independent filmmakers. It was first presented in 1994 with David O. Russell being the first recipient of the award for Spanking the Monkey, a film he also directed.

== Winners and nominees ==
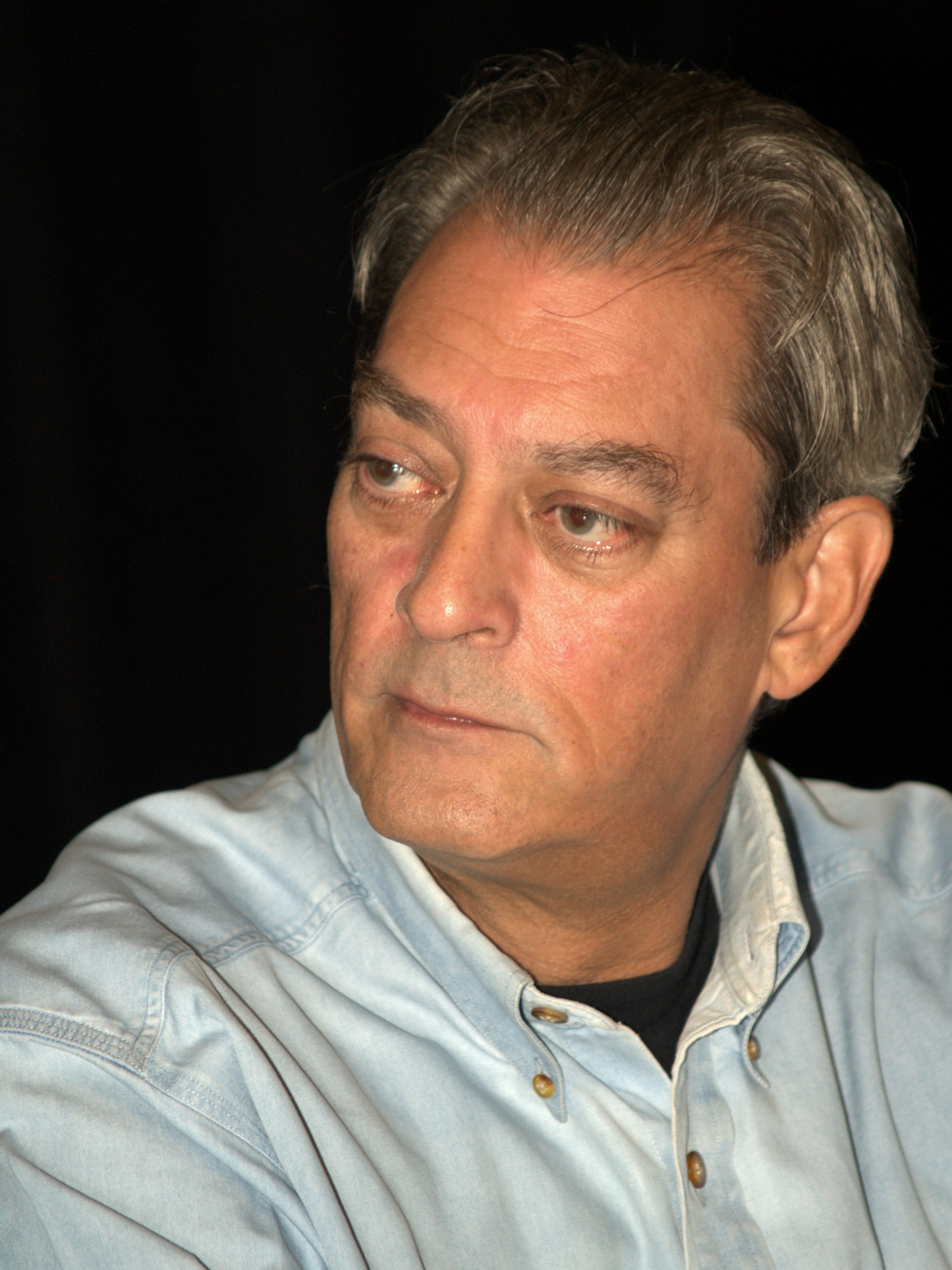
Paul Auster won for Smoke.

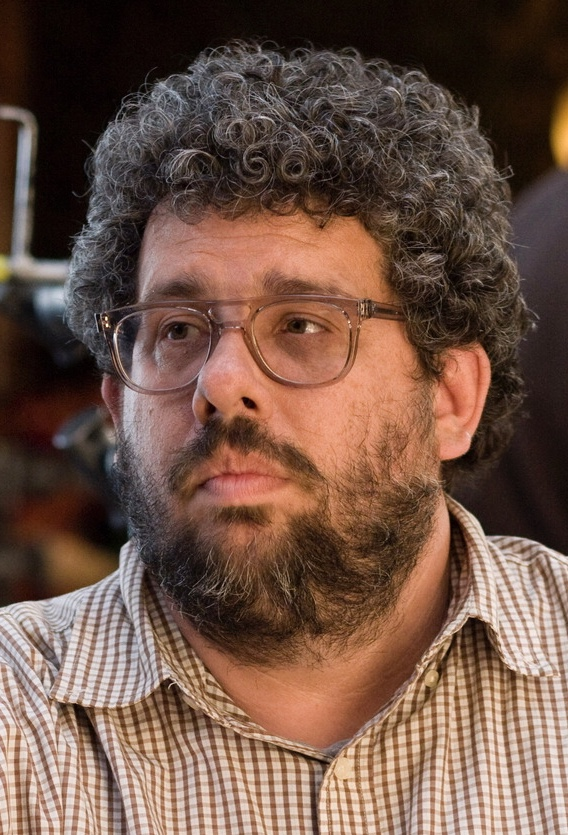
Neil LaBute won for In the Company of Men.

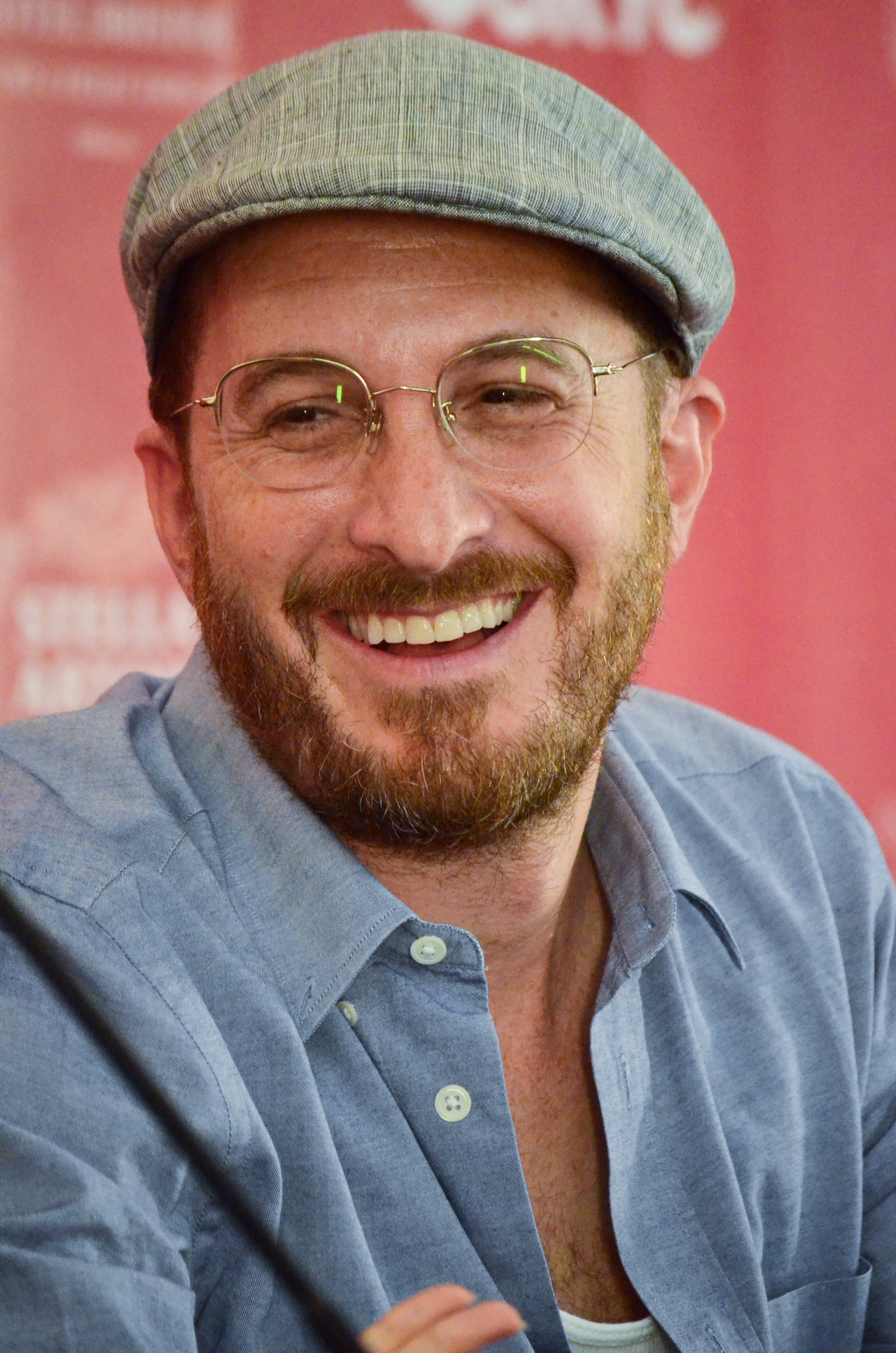
Darren Aronofsky won for Pi.

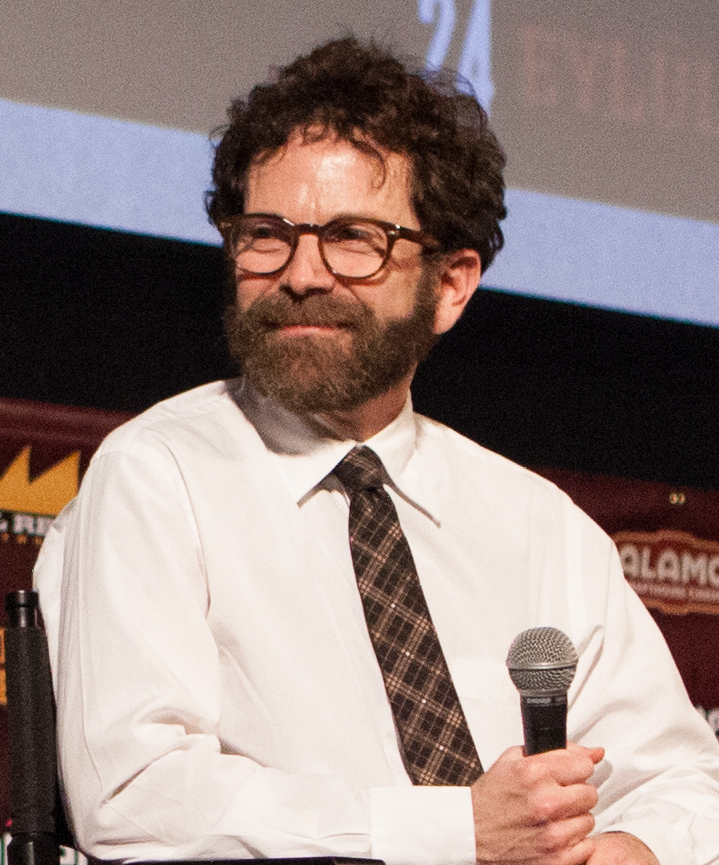
Charlie Kaufman won for Being John Malkovich.

=== 1990s ===
Year	Recipient(s)	Film
1994	David O. Russell	Spanking the Monkey
1994	Paul Zehrer	Blessing
1994	Kevin Smith	Clerks
1994	James Bosley	Fun
1994	Tom Noonan	What Happened Was
1995	Paul Auster	Smoke
1995	Harmony Korine	Kids
1995	James Gray	Little Odessa
1995	Steve McLean	Postcards from America
1995	Kelly Reichardt	River of Grass
1996	Joseph Tropiano and Stanley Tucci	Big Night
1996	Suzan-Lori Parks	Girl 6
1996	Lisa Krueger	Manny & Lo
1996	Michael Scott Myers	The Whole Wide World
1996	Steve Buscemi	Trees Lounge
1997	Neil LaBute	In the Company of Men
1997	Steven Schwartz	Critical Care
1997	Paul Thomas Anderson	Hard Eight
1997	Miguel Arteta	Star Maps
1997	Daniel Harris	The Bible and Gun Club
1998	Darren Aronofsky	Pi
1998	Lisa Cholodenko	High Art
1998	Matthew Weiss	Niagara, Niagara
1998	Tamara Jenkins	Slums of Beverly Hills
1998	Sherman Alexie	Smoke Signals
1999	Charlie Kaufman	Being John Malkovich
1999	Kimberly Peirce and Andy Bienen	Boys Don't Cry
1999	Anne Rapp	Cookie's Fortune
1999	Tod Williams	The Adventures of Sebastian Cole
1999	John Roach and Mary Sweeney	The Straight Story

=== 2000s ===
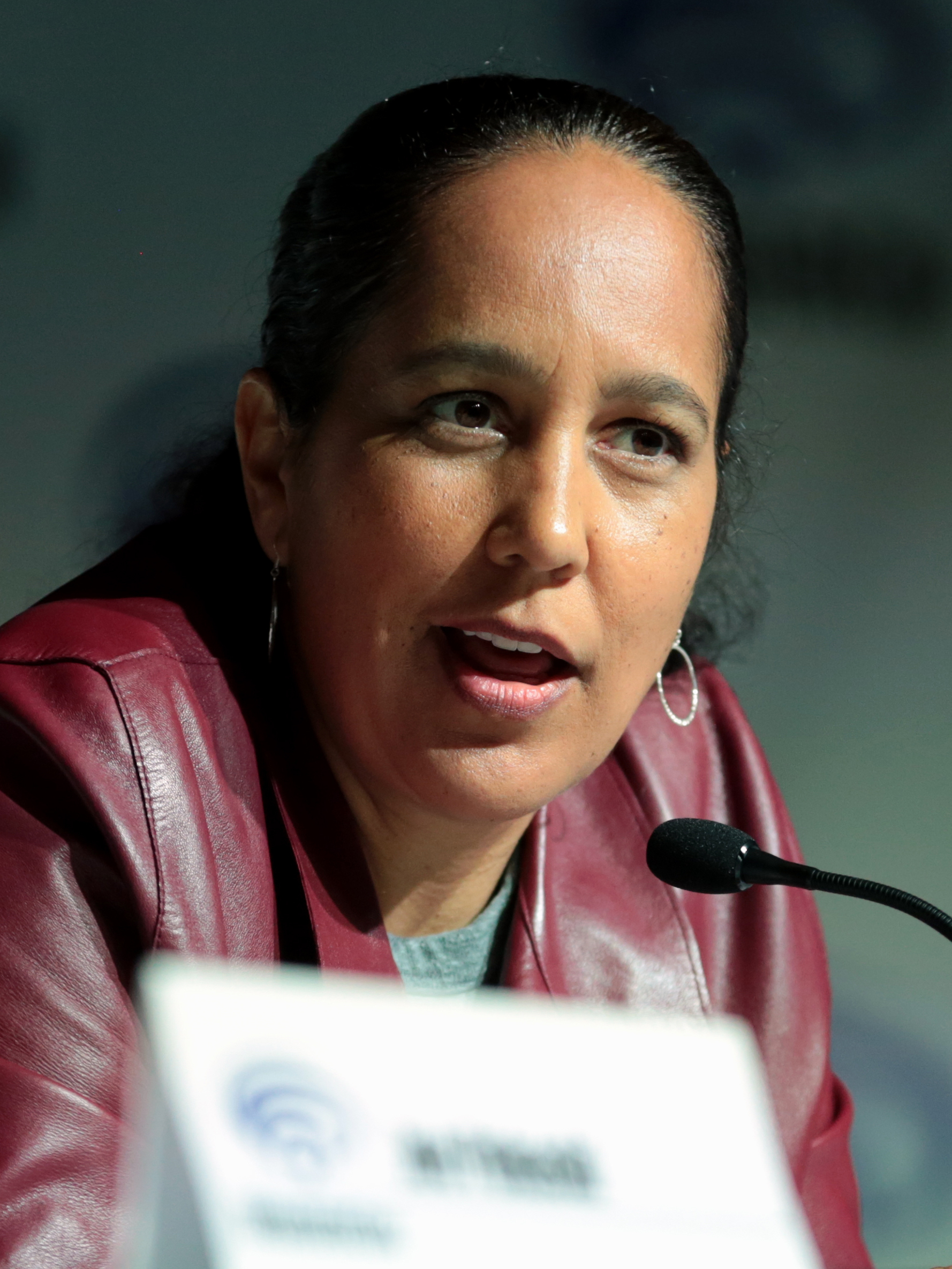
Gina Prince-Bythewood won for Love & Basketball.

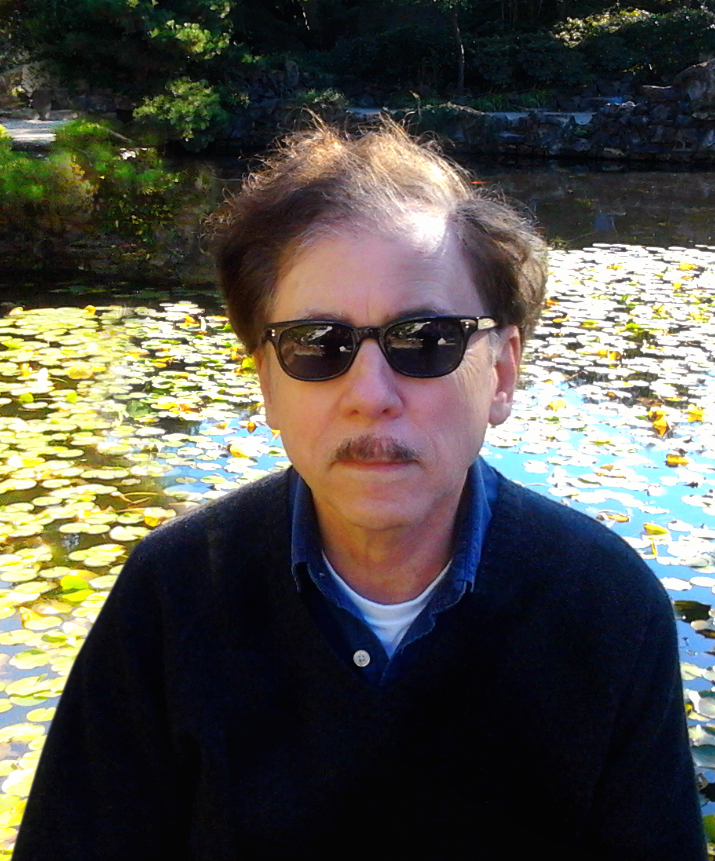
Terry Zwigoff won for Ghost World alongside Daniel Clowes.

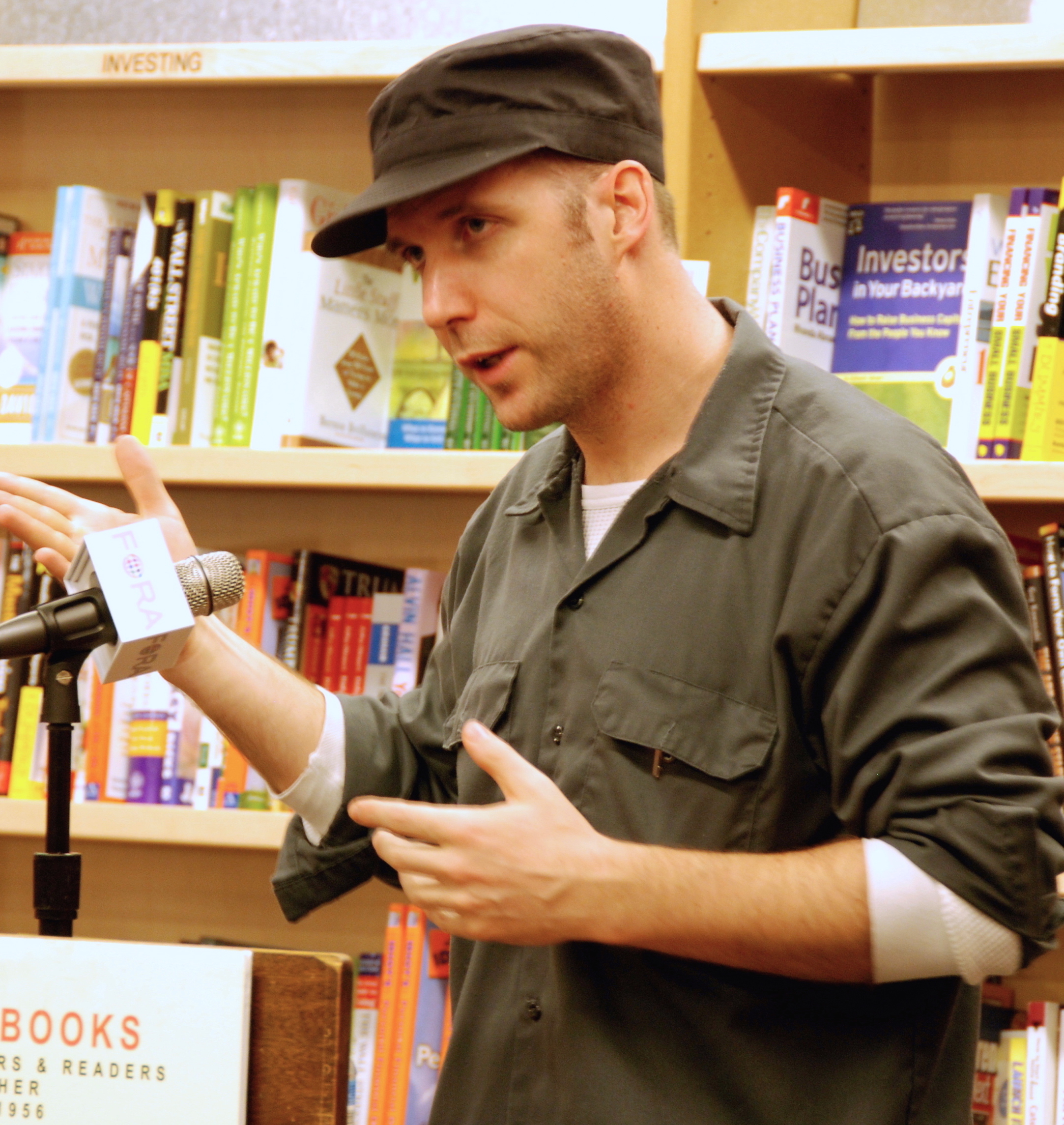
Michael Arndt won for Little Miss Sunshine.

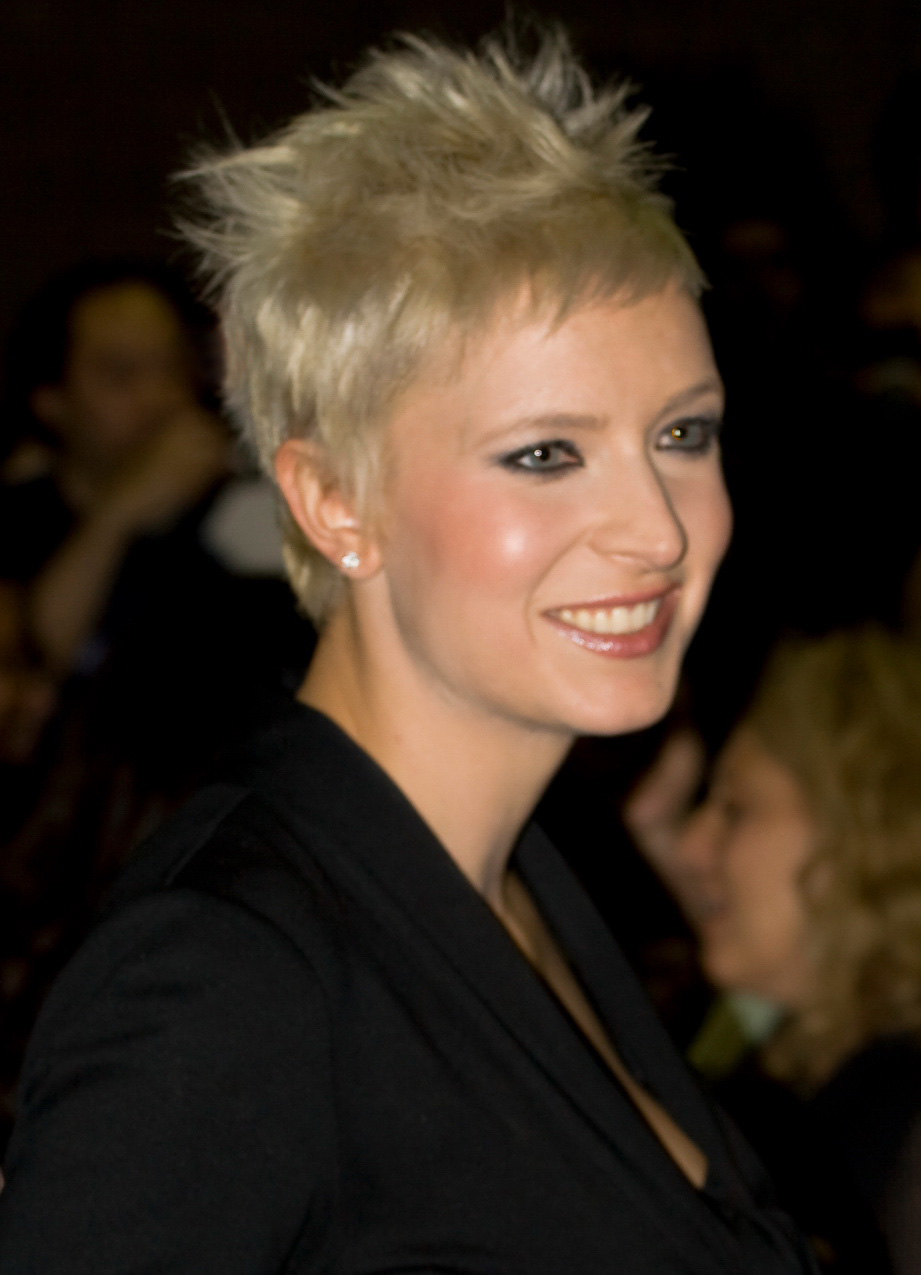
Diablo Cody won for Juno.

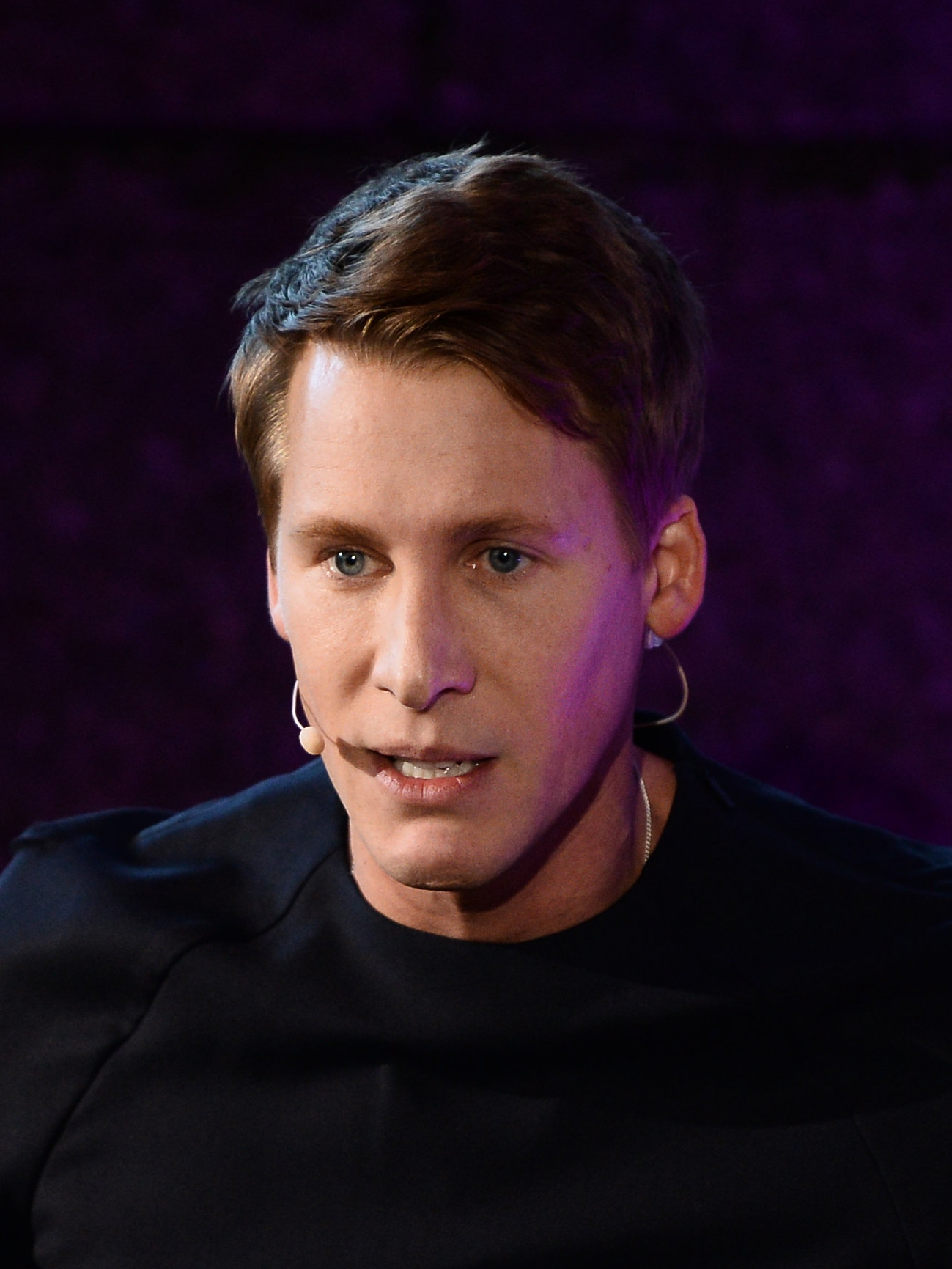
Dustin Lance Black won for Milk.

Year	Recipient(s)	Film
2000	Gina Prince-Bythewood	Love & Basketball
2000	Ben Younger	Boiler Room
2000	David Gordon Green	George Washington
2000	Jordan Walker-Pearlman	The Visit
2000	Ross Klavan and Michael McGruther	Tigerland
2001	Daniel Clowes and Terry Zwigoff	Ghost World
2001	Richard Kelly	Donnie Darko
2001	John Cameron Mitchell	Hedwig and the Angry Inch
2001	Stephen M. Ryder, Michael Cuesta and Gerald Cuesta	L.I.E.
2001	Jennifer Jason Leigh and Alan Cumming	The Anniversary Party
2002	Erin Cressida Wilson	Secretary
2002	Laura Cahill	Hysterical Blindness
2002	Burr Steers	Igby Goes Down
2002	Neil Burger	Interview with the Assassin
2002	Heather Juergensen and Jennifer Westfeldt	Kissing Jessica Stein
2003	Tom McCarthy	The Station Agent
2003	Karen Moncrieff	Blue Car
2003	Patty Jenkins	Monster
2003	Peter Sollett and Eva Vives	Raising Victor Vargas
2003	Catherine Hardwicke and Nikki Reed	Thirteen
2004	Joshua Marston	Maria Full of Grace
2004	Rodney Evans	Brother to Brother
2004	Zach Braff	Garden State
2004	Shane Carruth	Primer
2004	Mario de la Vega	Robbing Peter
2005	Duncan Tucker	Transamerica
2005	Kenneth Hanes	Fixing Frank
2005	Angus MacLachlan	Junebug
2005	Miranda July	Me and You and Everyone We Know
2005	Sabina Murray	The Beautiful Country
2006	Michael Arndt	Little Miss Sunshine
2006	Dito Montiel	A Guide to Recognizing Your Saints
2006	Gabrielle Zevin	Conversations with Other Women
2006	Ryan Fleck and Anna Boden	Half Nelson
2006	Goran Dukić	Wristcutters: A Love Story
2007	Diablo Cody	Juno
2007	Jeffrey Blitz	Rocket Science
2007	Zoe Cassavetes	Broken English
2007	Kelly Masterson	Before the Devil Knows You're Dead
2007	John Orloff	A Mighty Heart
2008	Dustin Lance Black	Milk
2008	Lance Hammer	Ballast
2008	Courtney Hunt	Frozen River
2008	Jonathan Levine	The Wackness
2008	Jenny Lumet	Rachel Getting Married
2009	Geoffrey Fletcher	Precious
2009	Sophie Barthes	Cold Souls
2009	Scott Cooper	Crazy Heart
2009	Cherien Dabis	Amreeka
2009	Tom Ford and David Scearce	A Single Man

=== 2010s ===
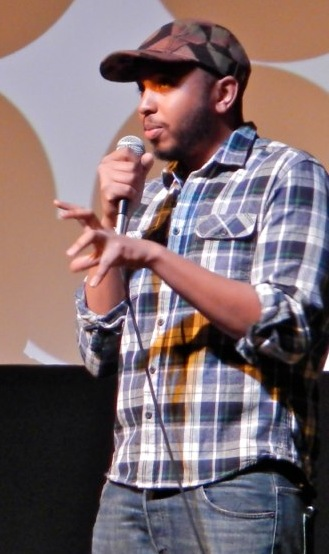
Justin Simien won for Dear White People.

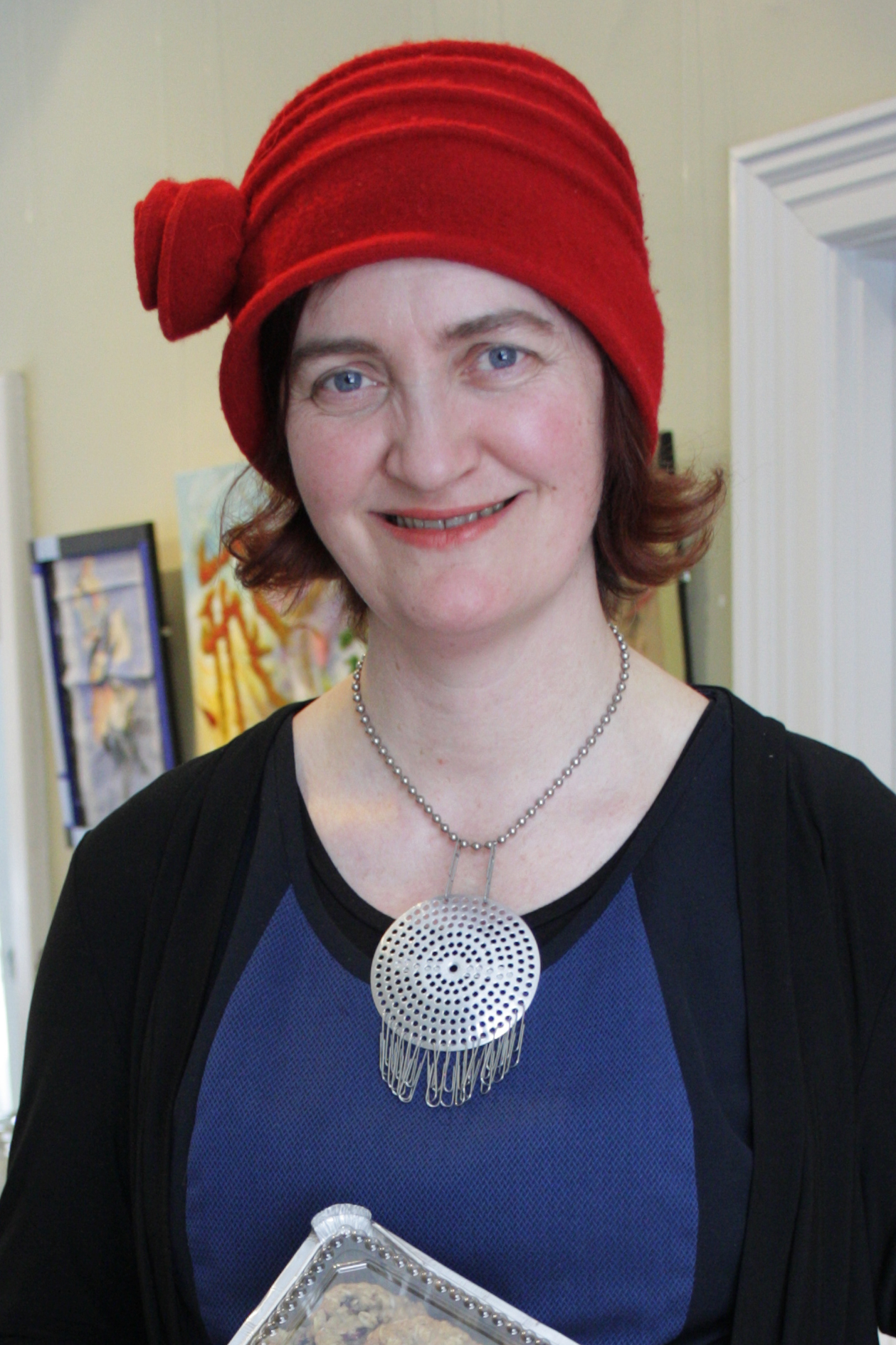
Emma Donoghue won for Room.

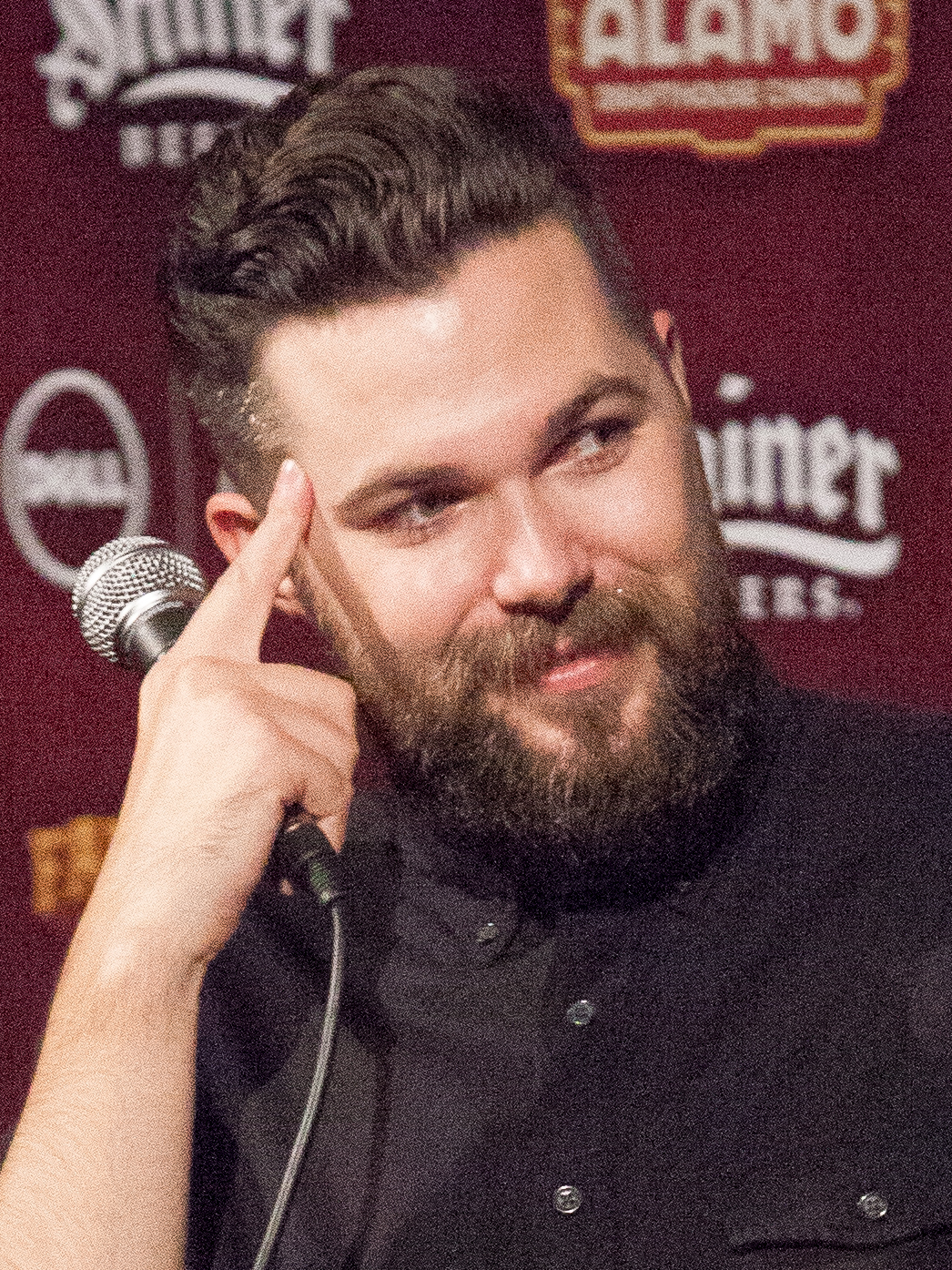
Robert Eggers won for The Witch.

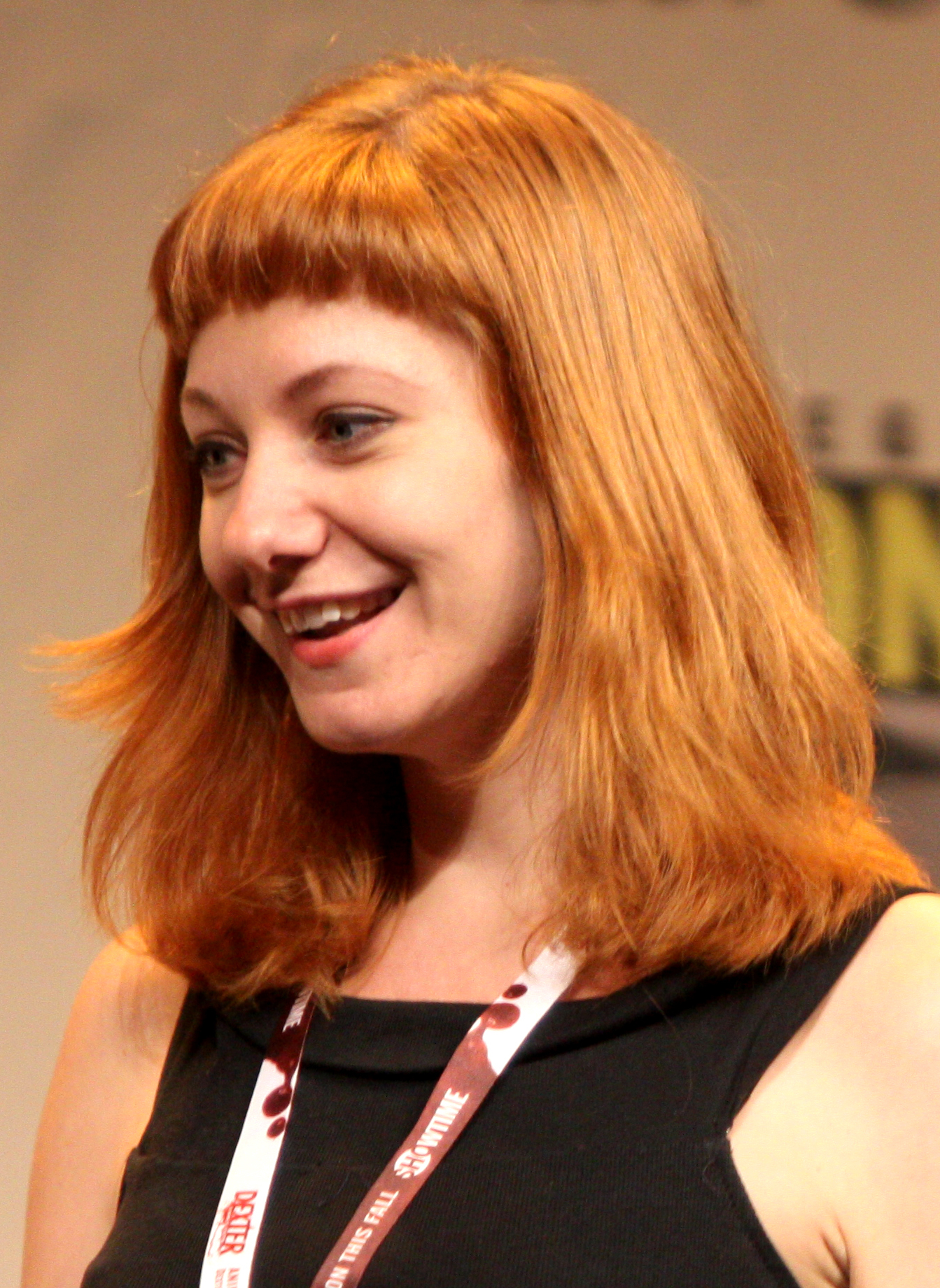
Emily Gordon won for The Big Sick.

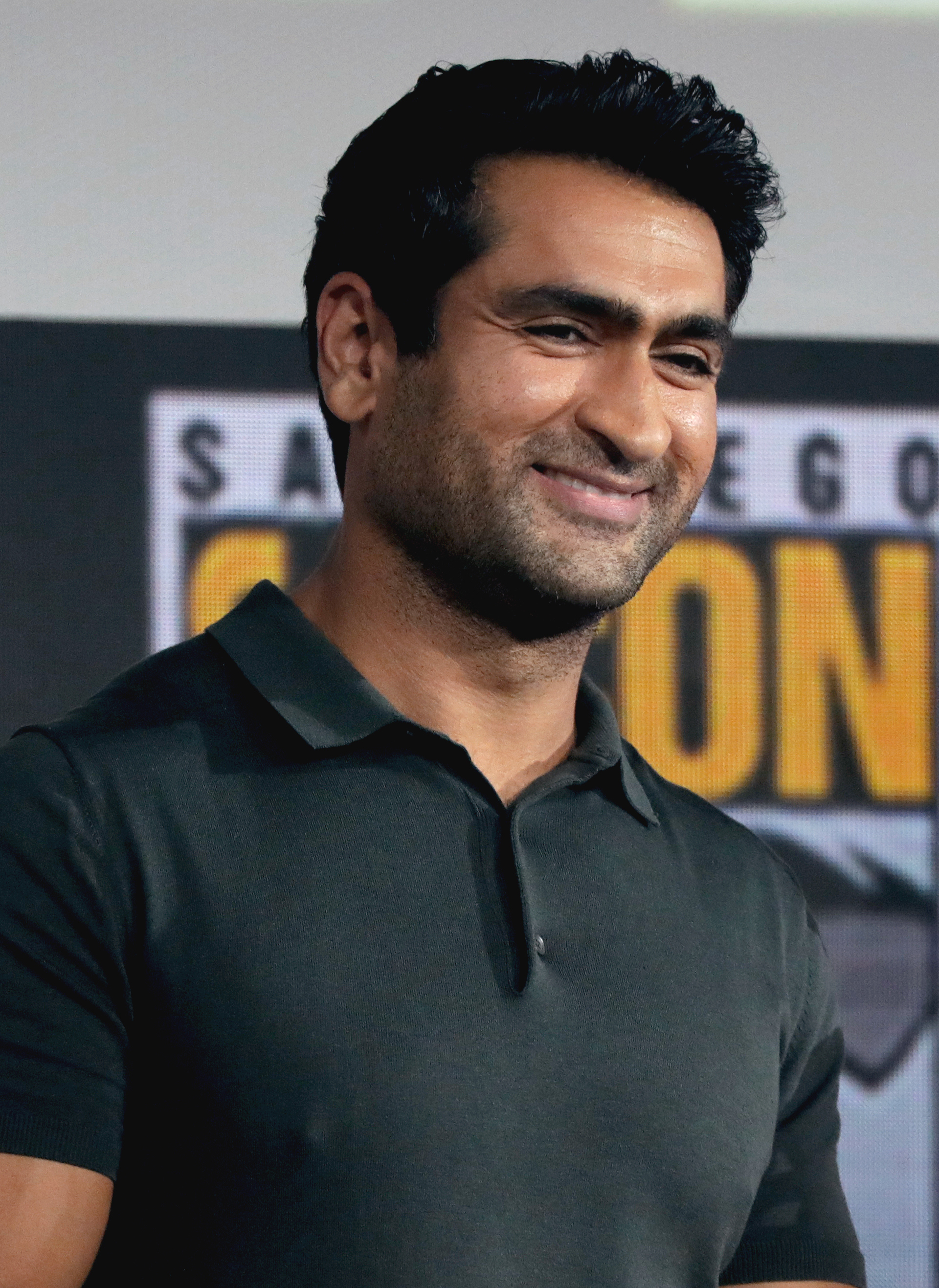
Kumail Nanjiani won for The Big Sick.

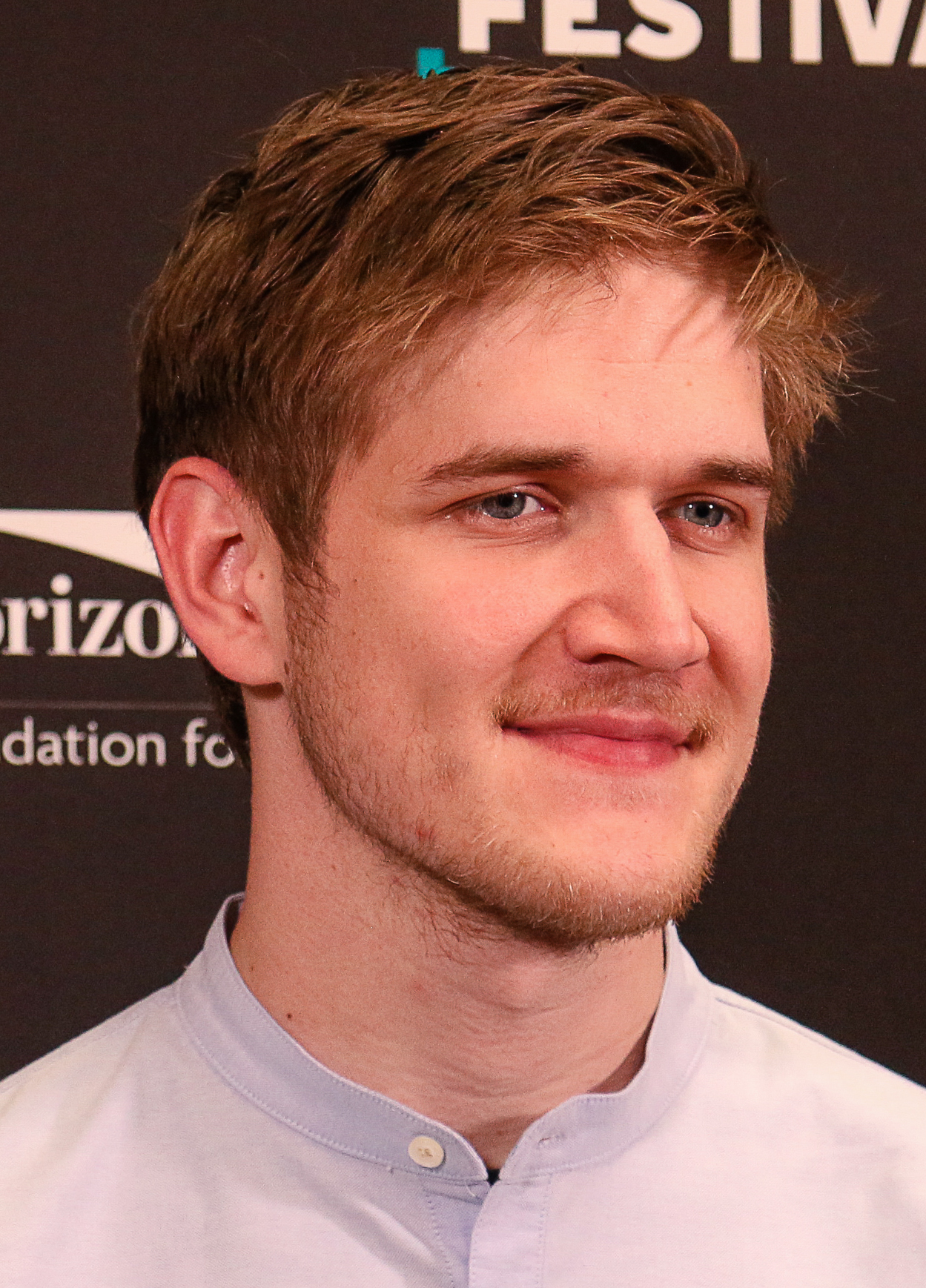
Bo Burnham won for Eighth Grade.

Year	Recipient(s)	Film
2010	Lena Dunham	Tiny Furniture
2010	Robert Glaudini	Jack Goes Boating
2010	Nik Fackler	Lovely, Still
2010	Dana Adam Shapiro and Evan M. Wiener	Monogamy
2010	Diane Bell	Obselidia
2011	Will Reiser	50/50
2011	Mike Cahill and Brit Marling	Another Earth
2011	J. C. Chandor	Margin Call
2011	Patrick deWitt	Terri
2011	Phil Johnston	Cedar Rapids
2012	Derek Connolly	Safety Not Guaranteed
2012	Rama Burshtein	Fill the Void
2012	Christopher D. Ford	Robot & Frank
2012	Rashida Jones and Will McCormack	Celeste and Jesse Forever
2012	Jonathan Lisecki	Gayby
2013	Bob Nelson	Nebraska
2013	Lake Bell	In a World...
2013	Joseph Gordon-Levitt	Don Jon
2013	Joey Soloway	Afternoon Delight
2013	Michael Starrbury	The Inevitable Defeat of Mister & Pete
2014	Justin Simien	Dear White People
2014	Desiree Akhavan	Appropriate Behavior
2014	Sara Colangelo	Little Accidents
2014	Justin Lader	The One I Love
2014	Anja Marquardt	She's Lost Control
2015	Emma Donoghue	Room
2015	Jesse Andrews	Me and Earl and the Dying Girl
2015	Jonas Carpignano	Mediterranea
2015	Marielle Heller	The Diary of a Teenage Girl
2015	John Magary; Russell Harbaugh and Myna Joseph (story by)	The Mend
2016	Robert Eggers	The Witch
2016	Chris Kelly	Other People
2016	Adam Mansbach	Barry
2016	Stella Meghie	Jean of the Joneses
2016	Craig Shilowich	Christine
2017	Emily V. Gordon and Kumail Nanjiani	The Big Sick
2017	Kris Avedisian, Kyle Espeleta (story by), and Jesse Wakeman (story by)	Donald Cried
2017	Ingrid Jungermann	Women Who Kill
2017	Kogonada	Columbus
2017	David Branson Smith & Matt Spicer	Ingrid Goes West
2018	Bo Burnham	Eighth Grade
2018	Christina Choe	Nancy
2018	Cory Finley	Thoroughbreds
2018	Jennifer Fox	The Tale
2018	Laurie & Quinn Shephard	Blame
2019	Fredrica Bailey and Stefon Bristol	See You Yesterday
2019	Hannah Bos and Paul Thureen	Driveways
2019	Bridget Savage Cole and Danielle Krudy	Blow the Man Down
2019	Jocelyn Deboer and Dawn Luebbe	Greener Grass
2019	James Montague and Craig W. Sanger	The Vast of Night

=== 2020s ===
Year	Recipient(s)	Film
2020	Andy Siara	Palm Springs
2020	Kitty Green	The Assistant
2020	Noah Hutton	Lapsis
2020	Channing Godfrey Peoples	Miss Juneteenth
2020	James Sweeney	Straight Up
2021	Michael Sarnoski and Vanessa Block	Pig
2021	Sheldon D. Brown and Matthew Fifer	Cicada
2021	Lyle Mitchell Corbine Jr.	Wild Indian
2021	Shatara Michelle Ford	Test Pattern
2021	Fran Kranz	Mass
2022	John Patton Ford	Emily the Criminal
2022	Joel Kim Booster	Fire Island
2022	Jamie Dack and Audrey Findlay, story by Jamie Dack	Palm Trees and Power Lines
2022	K.D. Dávila	Emergency
2022	Sarah DeLappe, story by Kristen Roupenian	Bodies Bodies Bodies
2023	Samy Burch; story by Samy Burch and Alex Mechanik	May December
2023	Tomás Gómez Bustillo	Chronicles of a Wandering Saint
2023	Laurel Parmet	The Starling Girl
2023	Noah Galvin, Molly Gordon, Nick Lieberman, and Ben Platt	Theater Camp
2023	Alejandro Rojas and Juan Sebastián Vásquez	Upon Entry
2024	Sean Wang	Dìdi
2024	Joanna Arnow	The Feeling That the Time for Doing Something Has Passed
2024	Annie Baker	Janet Planet
2024	India Donaldson	Good One
2024	Julio Torres	Problemista
2025	Alex Russell	Lurker
2025	Andrew DeYoung	Friendship
2025	Elena Oxman	Outerlands
2025	Syreeta Singleton	One of Them Days
2025	Constance Tsang	Blue Sun Palace
