= The Glass Menagerie (1987 film) =

1987 film by Paul Newman

- Promotional poster
- Directed by: Paul Newman
- Written by: Tennessee Williams
- Based on: The Glass Menagerie by Tennessee Williams
- Produced by: Burtt Harris
- Starring: Joanne Woodward; John Malkovich; Karen Allen; James Naughton
- Cinematography: Michael Ballhaus
- Edited by: David Ray
- Music by: Henry Mancini
- Production companies: Cineplex Odeon Films; Aspetuck Productions
- Distributed by: Cineplex Odeon Films
- Release date: October 23, 1987
- Running time: 134 minutes
- Country: United States
- Language: English
- Budget: $3.3 million
- Box office: $895,904

The Glass Menagerie is a 1987 American drama film directed by Paul Newman. It is a replication of a production of Tennessee Williams' 1944 play of the same title that originated at the Williamstown Theatre Festival and then transferred to the Long Wharf Theatre in New Haven, Connecticut. The film is the fourth adaptation of the Williams play, following a 1950 feature film and television movies made in 1966 and 1973. It was shown at the 1987 Cannes Film Festival and the Toronto International Film Festival before opening in New York City on October 23, 1987. It is also the last film directed by Newman before his death in 2008.

== Plot ==
Introduced by Tom Wingfield as a memory play, it is based on his recollection of his disillusioned and delusional mother Amanda and her shy, crippled daughter Laura. Amanda's husband abandoned the family long ago, and her memory of her days as a genteel Southern belle surrounded by devoted beaux may be more romanticized than real. Tom is an aspiring writer who works in a warehouse to support his family, and the banality and boredom of everyday life leads him to spend most of his spare time watching movies in local cinemas at all hours of the night. Amanda is obsessed with finding a proper "gentleman caller" for Laura, who spends most of her time with her collection of glass animal figurines. To appease his mother, Tom eventually brings Jim O'Connor home for dinner, but complications arise when Laura realizes he is the man she loved in high school and has thought of ever since. He dashes her hopes of a future together when he announces he is engaged. Infuriated, Amanda lashes out at her son for raising his sister's hopes and Tom leaves, never to return to his family.

== Cast ==
- Joanne Woodward as Amanda Wingfield
- John Malkovich as Tom Wingfield
- Karen Allen as Laura Wingfield
- James Naughton as Jim O'Connor

== Critical reception ==
Janet Maslin of The New York Times called the film "a serious and respectful adaptation, but never an incendiary one, perhaps because the odds against its capturing the play's real genius are simply too great. In any case, this Glass Menagerie catches more of the drama's closeness and narrowness than its fire ... [It] starts out stiffly and gets better as it goes along But quiet reverence is its prevailing tone, and in the end that seems thoroughly at odds with anything Williams ever intended."

Desson Howe of The Washington Post observed, "Acting is definitely the trouble in Menagerie. There's an awful lot of it here." He praised Karen Allen's performance and criticized Joanne Woodward's. On Paul Newman's direction, he wrote, "by filming this play in straightforward manner ... Newman emphasizes the artificiality of theater and distances you from the play".

Variety called it "a reverent record" of the Williams play "one watches with a kind of distant dreaminess rather than an intense emotional involvement" and cited the "brilliant performances ... well defined by Newman's direction."

As of December 2022, it holds a 75% approval rating on Rotten Tomatoes from 12 reviews.
