= Fredrica Bailey =

American screenwriter

Fredica Bailey is a screenwriter, who co-wrote the Netflix film See You Yesterday. Bailey won, with Stefon Bristol, the Independent Spirit Award for Best First Screenplay for See You Yesterday. Bailey and Bristol met at New York University, where Bailey was in the Dramatic Writing department.
