= Breathe (2024 film) =

Film by Stefon Bristol

- Theatrical release poster
- Directed by: Stefon Bristol
- Written by: Doug Simon
- Produced by: Basil Iwanyk; Erica Lee; Christian Mercuri; David Haring
- Starring: Jennifer Hudson; Milla Jovovich; Quvenzhané Wallis; Common; Sam Worthington
- Cinematography: Felipe Vara de Rey
- Edited by: Oriana Soddu
- Music by: Isabella Summers
- Production companies: Capstone Studios; Thunder Road Films; Streamline Global
- Distributed by: Variance Films
- Release date: April 26, 2024
- Running time: 93 minutes
- Country: United States
- Language: English

Breathe is a 2024 American science fiction thriller film directed by Stefon Bristol, written by Doug Simon, and starring Jennifer Hudson, Milla Jovovich, Quvenzhané Wallis, Common, and Sam Worthington. The film is set in a world where oxygen levels on Earth have dropped making it impossible to live on the planet's surface without specialized equipment. It was released on April 26, 2024.

== Plot ==
After a tipping point catastrophe, Earth is void of plants and global oxygen levels have dropped to 5%. Darius, his wife Maya, daughter Zora, and father survive together near Brooklyn in an armored bunker with an oxygen generator that Darius built, taking brief excursions outside supported by oxygen tanks. One day, Darius leaves to bury his father, who died the day before, and never returns.

Maya and Zora come across two people armed with long guns looking for their bunker. The two, Tess and Lucas, claim they're from a colony of survivors near Philadelphia with a broken oxygen machine and that Tess knew to find Darius for aid because she was a former colleague of his. Zora believes Tess and convinces Maya to let them in. Maya ties them up and is about to let them inside when a third person suddenly appears. Zora wounds him with a pistol but he forces himself inside before being captured by Maya. Tess claims the third man, Micah, was their lookout whom they didn't reveal as they didn't know if Maya and Zora could be trusted.

Tess and Lucas lure Maya outside and capture her, injuring her leg. Micah also tries to escape, tying up Zora, but dying of blood loss from his wound. Unable to get inside, Maya and Tess leave to find Darius and his key card. Maya reveals that Darius sacrificed himself on purpose because he knew his bunker design wouldn't support three people, and he hoped that by doing so, he would give the technically gifted Zora time to fix it.

Maya finds the key card on Darius' body but the car they took has died. Tess returns alone due to Maya' injured leg, promising to return for her. When Tess arrives at the bunker, Lucas forces her to work on the oxygen generator rather than to go rescue Maya. Tess admits that she never knew Darius; she found the location of the bunker from the ham radio broadcast Zora would send to her departed father.

Lucas shoots Tess after finding out that the bunker can only support two people. He plans to live in the bunker with Zora, abandoning the Philadelphia colony. Maya wakes up in the car, surprised that her oxygen tank has lasted this long. She sees a plant nearby and discovers that the oxygen level in the air has recovered. She charges the car and returns to rescue Zora, but Lucas blows up the bunker, killing himself. Zora drives Maya away and they narrowly make it to the Philadelphia colony, where Zora repairs the oxygen generator to support a large colony.

== Cast ==
- Jennifer Hudson as Maya
- Milla Jovovich as Tess
- Quvenzhané Wallis as Zora
- Common as Darius
- Sam Worthington as Lucas
- Raúl Castillo as Micah
- Dan Martin as Mike
- Remington Hoffman as Brian Yune

== Production ==
In December 2019, Doug Simon's screenplay Breathe was revealed to be on that year's "Black List" of the most-liked unproduced screenplays in Hollywood. In May 2022, it was announced that Sam Worthington, Jennifer Hudson, Milla Jovovich, Quvenzhané Wallis and Common were set to star in the film, to be directed by Stefon Bristol.

Filming took place on location in Pennsylvania during late 2022.

== Release ==
Breathe was released in limited theaters, VOD and digital formats on April 26, 2024.

== Reception ==
On the review aggregator website Rotten Tomatoes, 14% of 14 critics' reviews are positive, with an average rating of 4.4/10.
