= Year by the Sea =

- Theatrical release poster
- Directed by: Alexander Janko
- Written by: Alexander Janko
- Based on: A Year by the Sea: Thoughts of an Unfinished Woman by Joan Anderson
- Produced by: Laura Goodenow; Alexander Janko; Dale Armin Johnson; Bill Latka
- Starring: Karen Allen
- Cinematography: Bryan Papierski
- Edited by: Noriko Sakamoto
- Music by: Alexander Janko
- Production companies: Montabela Productions; Rivet Entertainment LLC
- Distributed by: Real Women Make Waves
- Release date: April 9, 2016 (Vail)
- Running time: 114 minutes
- Country: United States
- Language: English

Year by the Sea is a 2016 American independent comedy-drama film starring Karen Allen, Yannick Bisson, S. Epatha Merkerson, Michael Cristofer, and Celia Imrie. It was written, directed and scored by composer Alexander Janko in his directorial debut. The film is based on Joan Anderson's 2000 The New York Times best-selling memoir A Year by the Sea: Thoughts of an Unfinished Woman.

== Premise ==
Hoping to reclaim who she was before marriage and children, an empty nester retreats to Cape Cod where she embarks upon a quest to set herself free.

== Cast ==
- Karen Allen as Joan Anderson
- Celia Imrie as Joan Erikson
- S. Epatha Merkerson as Liz
- Michael Cristofer as Robin
- Monique Gabriela Curnen as Luce
- Jane Hajduk as Judy
- Kohler McKenzie as Billy
- Alvin Epstein as Erik Erikson

== Locations ==
Year by the Sea was filmed in Massachusetts at various locations on Cape Cod, including Wellfleet, Orleans, Chatham and Eastham.

== Release ==
Year by the Sea" opened at the 2016 Vail Film Festival in Vail, Colorado, where the film won the Audience Award and Karen Allen was honored with the Vanguard Award for her role, along with her lifetime achievements in film. The film played at a total of 18 film festivals throughout 2016, earning a total of 16 awards. In January 2017, the film was released by independent distributor Real Women Make Waves at select Florida theaters. In May 2017, the film was released in select New England theaters. In September 2017, the film launched its national release at Lincoln Plaza Cinemas in New York City, ultimately playing in more than 100 theaters nationwide. In late 2017, the film became available for rent and purchase on Amazon.com in the US and on iTunes in the US and Canada. It launched for rent/sale on Amazon UK in July 2019.

== Reception ==
On the review aggregator website Rotten Tomatoes, the film has an approval rating of 50% based on 24 reviews. On Metacritic, the film has a weighted average score of 43 out of 100 based on nine critic reviews, indicating "mixed or average reviews".

Glenn Kenny of The New York Times gave the film a positive review, calling it "refreshing in its depiction of diverse, older female characters." Sheri Linden of The Hollywood Reporter also gave the film a positive review, saying, "In Allen's spark and grace, there's a real sense of discovery." Alan Scherstuhl of The Village Voice wrote that "the film has soothing, even therapeutic value." Conversely, Bill Goodykoontz of The Arizona Republic awarded the film a score of two stars out of five, and The Washington Post's Susan Wloszczyna gave the film two stars out of four. Ty Burr of The Boston Globe awarded the film one-and-a-half stars. Al Alexander of The Patriot Ledger gave the film a negative review and wrote that it "is little more than a lame excuse for good actors to embarrass themselves by uttering eye-rolling bromides about aging gracefully."

=== Awards ===
Audience Choice: Flickers' Rhode Island International Film Festival; Naperville Independent Film Festival; Berkshire International Film Festival (tie); Vail Film Festival

Best Feature: On Location: Memphis International Film and Music Festival

Best Screenplay: Grand Prize - Flickers' Rhode Island International Film Festival; (Honors) Outstanding Achievement - Newport Beach Film Festival

Best Music: Alexander Janko - Hamilton Film Festival

Overall Awards: Carpe Diem Andretta Award - Woodstock Film Festival

Actor Awards: Best Actress (Karen Allen) — Naperville Independent Film Festival & Hamilton Film Festival; Women in Film Award (Karen Allen) — St. Louis International Film Festival; Creative Vision Award (Karen Allen) — Flickers' Rhode Island International Film Festival; Vanguard Award (Karen Allen) — Vail Film Festival; Best Ensemble Cast — Best Actors Film Festival
