= See You Yesterday =

2019 film directed by Stefon Bristol

- Official release poster
- Directed by: Stefon Bristol
- Screenplay by: Fredrica Bailey; Stefon Bristol
- Based on: See You Yesterday by: Fredrica Bailey; Stefon Bristol
- Produced by: Spike Lee
- Starring: Eden Duncan-Smith; Danté Crichlow; Marsha Stephanie Blake; Brian "Stro" Bradley
- Cinematography: Felipe Vara de Rey
- Edited by: Jennifer Lee
- Music by: Michael Abels
- Production company: 40 Acres and a Mule Filmworks
- Distributed by: Netflix
- Release date: May 17, 2019
- Running time: 87 minutes
- Country: United States
- Language: English

See You Yesterday is a 2019 American science fiction film directed by Stefon Bristol with a screenplay by Bristol and Fredrica Bailey based on Bristol's 2017 short film of the same name. It stars Eden Duncan-Smith, Danté Crichlow, Marsha Stephanie Blake, and Brian "Stro" Bradley.

The film follows the story of an ambitious science prodigy, who uses her prowess and capabilities to create time machines to save her brother who has been killed by a racist police officer. As she tries to alter the events of the past, she will eventually face the perilous consequences of time travel.

It was released on May 17, 2019, by Netflix. The film received positive reviews and was nominated for two awards at the 35th Independent Spirit Awards, with Bristol and Bailey winning Best First Screenplay.

== Plot ==
C.J. Walker is an ambitious science prodigy who is working to build a time machine alongside her best friend, Sebastian "Bash" Thomas. Their first attempt fails shortly before the last day of school.

C.J. and Sebastian's last class is with Mr. Lockhart, their science teacher. As the teens are hoping to present their class project at the science expo on the week of July 5, she asks him to raise their project grade to impress potential school scouts, so they can earn university scholarships. He invites her to contemplate the ethical and philosophical ramifications of time travel.

The pair's second attempt succeeds, sending them back 24 hours. C.J. seeks revenge on her ex-boyfriend Jared by pranking him. He chases her and is hit by a car, breaking his arm. Sebastian criticizes C.J. before they nearly see their past selves and return to the present.

On July 4, C.J.'s older brother Calvin and his friend Dennis leave a party after Jared confronts him over C.J. As they are walking away, two other black men bump into them rushing down the street. Shortly after, a police car approaches and the officers are immediately suspicious of them. Mistaking them for the thieves they had been chasing, one of the officers kills Calvin.

After Calvin's funeral, C.J. insists on going back a second time to save him. Sebastian expresses concern about the risk, but agrees to join her. They plan to reroute Calvin and Dennis before the shooting, but Jared spots and chases them for breaking his arm. The detour causes them to arrive too late to save Calvin.

They try a third time, enlisting their classmate Eduardo's help and borrowing his highly resilient circuit boards. This time, C.J. tries to stop the convenience store robbery and avoid the police chase entirely by warning the shop owner. Past Sebastian sees present C.J. & is now in the middle of everything without knowing what's going on. C.J. successfully warns the owner and he pulls a gun on the robbers. They pull one back on him and past Sebastian winds up being shot and killed. As C.J. follows him out of the shop, present day Sebastian catches sight of himself dying on the sidewalk and disappears as the past Sebastian dies.

C.J. goes back a fourth time to save both Sebastian and Calvin. They reach Calvin and Dennis in time, but she struggles to convince them of the situation. The officer who previously killed Calvin drives up to them, and Calvin says that he had nothing to do with the robbery. The officer subdues all four of them, and when Calvin realizes the others could get killed, he sacrifices himself as C.J. and Sebastian escape.

Back in the present, Sebastian confronts C.J. and demands to know how many times she has gone back. She admits that the previous attempt was the fourth time and that he had died on the third. He forbids her to try again, but she travels a fifth time.

Back in time and alone, C.J. breaks into a run.

== Cast ==
- Eden Duncan-Smith as C.J. Walker
- Danté Crichlow as Sebastian Thomas, C.J.'s best friend
- Brian "Stro" Bradley as Calvin Walker, C.J.'s older brother
- Marsha Stephanie Blake as Phaedra, C.J. and Calvin's mother.
- Johnathan Nieves as Eduardo, Sebastian's friend.
- Michael J. Fox as Mr. Lockhart, C.J. and Sebastian's science teacher
- Myra Lucretia Taylor as Gloria, Sebastian's grandmother
- Wavyy Jonez as Dennis, Calvin's friend
- Rayshawn Richardson as Jared, C.J.'s ex-boyfriend
- Khail Bryant as Tiffany
- Ejyp Johnson as Rosco
- Barrington Walters, Jr. as Keith
- Muhammad Cunningham as Malik
- Carlos Arce as Carlito
- Rony Clanton as Sly
- Yvette Mercedes as Rosie
- Courtney Noel as Kingsley
- Manny Ureña as Officer Perez
- Brett Smith as Officer Bryce

== Production ==
The film was shot in Queens and Brooklyn, New York in 2018.

== Release ==
It was released on May 17, 2019 on Netflix streaming.

== Reception ==
The film has received favorable reviews from critics. On the review aggregator website, Rotten Tomatoes, the film holds an approval rating of 93% based on 41 reviews, with an average of 7.3/10. The website's critics consensus reads, "See You Yesterday marries a novel sci-fi premise with urgent social relevance and forges something excitedly new from the union—providing an impressive showcase for star Eden Duncan-Smith and debut writer-director Stefon Bristol." Metacritic, which uses a weighted average, assigned a score of 74 out of 100 based on nine critics, indicating "generally favorable reviews".

Brian Tallerico of the RogerEbert.com gave the film 3 out of 4 stars, reflecting on the film: "Bristol [the director] makes a number of smart decisions, including keeping it close to 80 minutes and bringing Flatbush to cinematic life", but as the film "becomes more cluttered with time travel loops, it becomes less interesting".

In a 2020 interview with The Atlantic, former football player turned children's author Martellus Bennett criticized the plot of the movie, lamenting that the movie could have been "the black version of Back to the Future" but took a violent turn instead (i.e. the cop shooting). According to him, "such narratives only reinforce the old dead-or-in-jail idea" as well as the notion that "Black trauma has become the de facto Black culture."

== Music ==
The soundtrack is mainly composed of reggae and soca music:

- Tenor Saw: "Ring the Alarm"
- Olatunji Yearwood: "Oh Yay!"
- Buddy feat. Ty Dolla Sign: "Hey Up There"
- New Babylon: "Reggae Revolution!
- Dawn Penn: "You Don't Love Me (No, No, No)"

== See also ==
- List of black films of the 2010s
- List of Afrofuturist films
- List of films featuring time loops
