= Chase Whiteside =

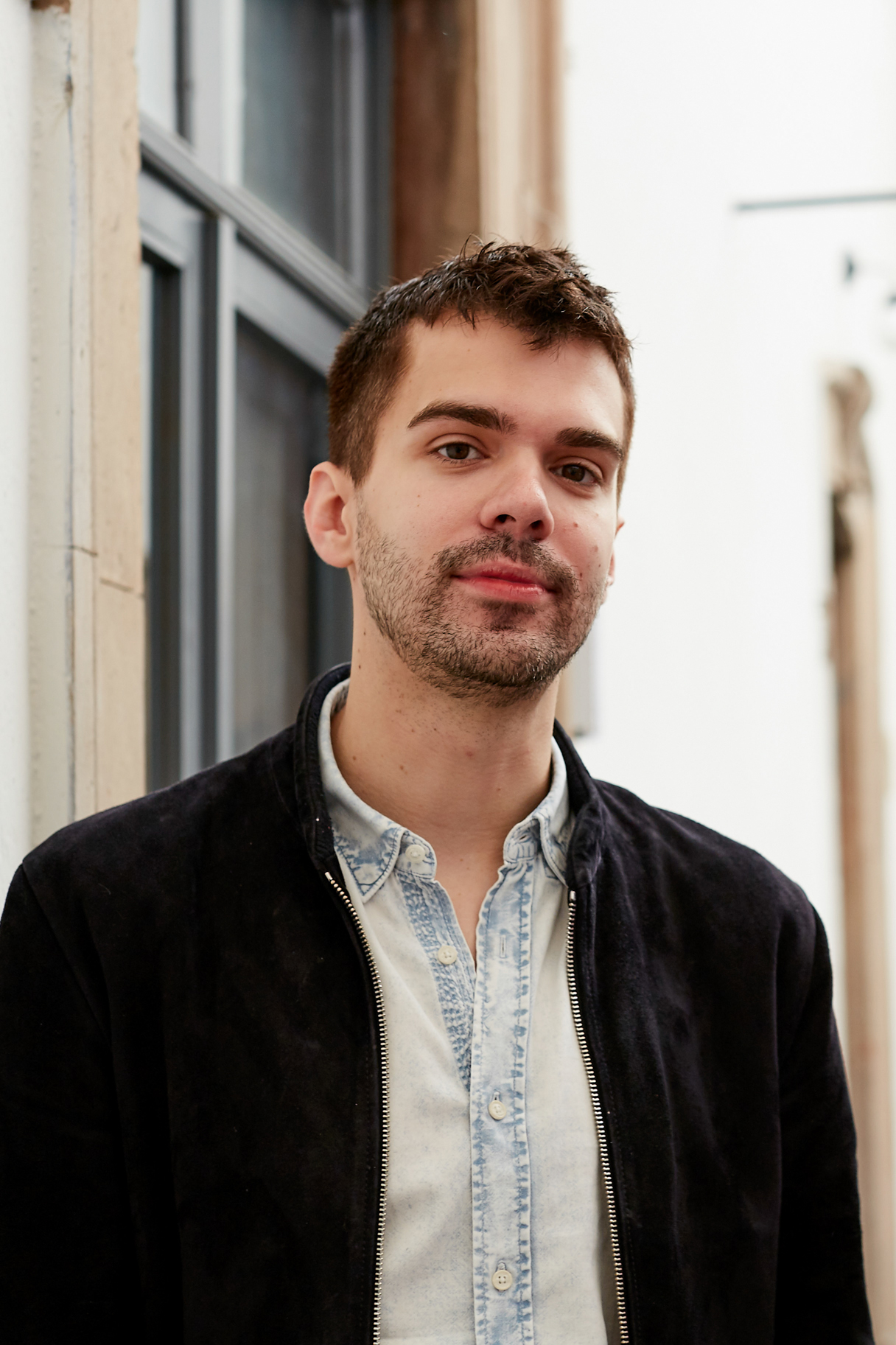
- Born: Chase Augustus Whiteside; March 4, 1988 (age 38)
- Occupations: Journalist, documentary filmmaker, liberal activist

Chase Augustus Whiteside (born March 4, 1988) is a documentary filmmaker, journalist, and co-founder of New Left Media. Whiteside is perhaps best known for his films documenting the participants at Tea Party events. Those documentaries, which IndieWire called "a perfect example of where documentary form and style is headed," have received more than 7 million views on YouTube. Henry Rollins wrote of his interviews with conservatives in a Vanity Fair column, "The very talented Mr. Ripley is a good interviewer and puts his subjects at ease." The Advocate calls him an "ambitious gay reporter."

Whiteside has been notably critical of cable news, telling The Washington Post's David Weigel, "CNN, like Fox News and MSNBC, should be largely dismissed as serious sources of news... as these outlets are all in the market of selling journalism through personalities, talking haircuts who report as much on what each other are saying as they do on reality."

== Selected filmography ==
- Lifelike (2011)
- The Ocean Doesn't Care (2013)
- América (2018)
