= Stefon Bristol =

American film director

- Education: New York University, Morehouse College, Suffolk County Community College
- Occupations: Film director and screenwriter

Stefon Bristol is an American film director and screenwriter. He has directed the science fiction films See You Yesterday (2019) and Breathe (2024).

== Career ==
Bristol studied at New York University's Graduate Film program, under mentor Spike Lee. Bristol also acted as an assistant to Lee, while Lee was filming BlacKkKlansman.

Bristol first feature See You Yesterday was originally made as a short for his thesis film, before expanding into a feature film. Spike Lee would later help Bristol in producing the film. It took five years to complete, with the film's plot combining elements of science fiction and social justice issues. The film was released on May 17, 2019 on Netflix. Bristol received nominations for Best First Feature and Best First Screenplay (with Fredica Bailey) at the 2020 Independent Spirit Awards. Bristol and Bailey won the Independent Spirit Award for Best First Screenplay and thanked Lee in their acceptance speech.

In 2022, it was announced that Bristol was directing the science fiction film Breathe, starring Jennifer Hudson and Milla Jovovich. The film was released on April 26, 2024.

== Filmography ==
Directed features
Year	Title	Distributor
2019	See You Yesterday	Netflix
2024	Breathe	Variance Films
