= Karen Allen =

American actress (born 1951)

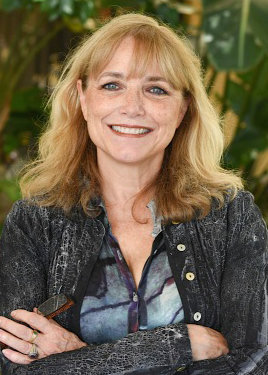
- Allen in 2017
- Born: Karen Jane Allen; October 5, 1951 (age 75); Carrollton, Illinois, U.S.
- Education: Fashion Institute of Technology; George Washington University; Lee Strasberg Theatre Institute
- Occupation: Actress
- Years active: 1974–present
- Known for: Role of Marion Ravenwood in the Indiana Jones films Raiders of the Lost Ark, Kingdom of the Crystal Skull, Dial of Destiny
- Spouse: Kale Browne (m. 1988; div. 1998)
- Children: 1
- Website: karenallen-actor-director.com

Karen Jane Allen (born October 5, 1951) is an American film, television and stage actress. She made her film debut in the comedy film Animal House (1978), which was soon followed by a small role in Woody Allen's romantic comedy-drama Manhattan (1979) and a co-lead role in Philip Kaufman's coming-of-age film The Wanderers (1979), before co-starring opposite Al Pacino in William Friedkin's crime thriller Cruising (1980).

Allen's critical and commercial breakthrough came when she portrayed Marion Ravenwood opposite Harrison Ford in Raiders of the Lost Ark (1981), for which she won the Saturn Award for Best Actress. She later co-starred in Shoot the Moon (1982), Starman (1984), for which she was again nominated for the Saturn Award for Best Actress, and Scrooged (1988).

Allen has also received recognition for her work in The Glass Menagerie (1987), Year by the Sea (2016), and Colewell (2019). She reprised her role as Marion Ravenwood in Indiana Jones and the Kingdom of the Crystal Skull (2008) and Indiana Jones and the Dial of Destiny (2023). Her stage work has included performances on Broadway, and she has directed both stage and film productions.

== Early life ==
Allen was born on October 5, 1951, in Carrollton, Illinois, to Ruth Patricia (née Howell) (1927–2020), a university professor, and Carroll Thompson Allen (1925–2015), an FBI agent. She is of English, Irish, Scottish, and Welsh descent. Her father's job forced the family to move often. "I grew up moving almost every year and so I was always the new kid in school and always, in a way, was deprived of ever really having any lasting friendships", Allen said in 1987. Although Allen says her father was very much involved in the family, she felt that she and her two sisters grew up in a very female-dominated household.

After she graduated from DuVal High School in Lanham, Maryland, in 1969, she moved to New York City to study art and design at Fashion Institute of Technology for two years. Allen later ran a boutique on the University of Maryland campus and spent time traveling through South and Central Asia. She attended George Washington University and began to study and perform with the experimental company, the Washington Theatre Laboratory, in Washington, D.C. In 1974, Allen joined Shakespeare & Company in Massachusetts. Three years later, she moved back to New York City and studied at the Lee Strasberg Theater Institute.

== Career ==
Allen made her major film debut in 1978 in National Lampoon's Animal House. Her next two film appearances were in The Wanderers, in 1979, and A Small Circle of Friends in 1980, where she played one of three radical college students during the 1960s. She also appeared (as a guest star) in the 1979 pilot episode of the long-running CBS series Knots Landing. She had a small role as a television actor in Woody Allen's film Manhattan (1979), before being cast as the love interest of Al Pacino in William Friedkin's controversial film Cruising (1980).

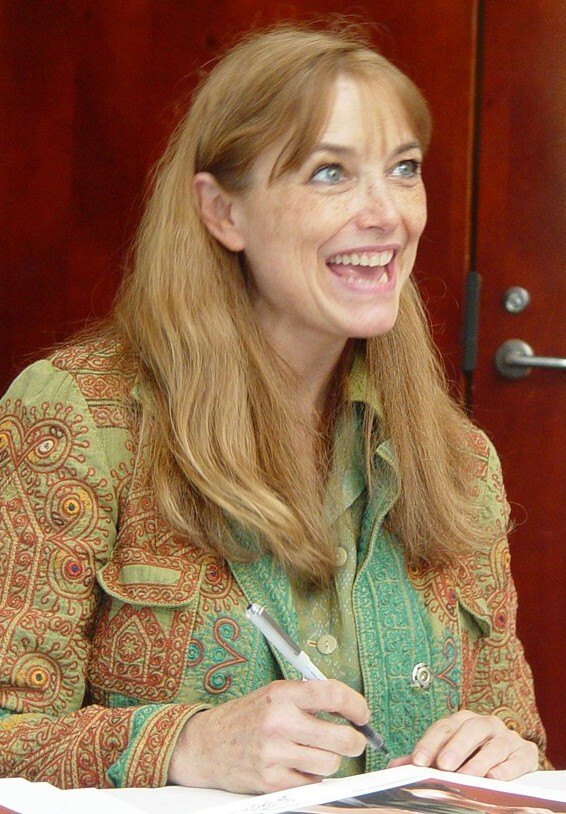
Allen at the 2006 Dallas Comic Con

Allen's career-changing role came with the blockbuster movie Raiders of the Lost Ark (1981), directed by Steven Spielberg, in which she played Marion Ravenwood, the love interest of Indiana Jones (Harrison Ford). Allen won the Saturn Award for Best Actress for her performance. After a few minor films, including leading roles in the dramatic thriller Split Image (1982), directed by Ted Kotcheff, and the Paris-set romantic drama Until September (1984), directed by Richard Marquand, as well as other stage appearances, she co-starred with Jeff Bridges in John Carpenter's science-fiction film Starman (1984). The film was a critical success, and later spawned the short-lived Starman television series in 1986. Allen's performance in the film earned her another Saturn Award nomination for Best Actress.

Allen debuted on Broadway in the 1982 production The Monday After The Miracle. In 1983, she played the lead in the off-Broadway play Extremities, a physically demanding role about a woman who turns the tables on a would-be rapist who attacks her. She often took breaks from movie roles to concentrate on stage acting; Allen appeared as Laura in the Paul Newman–directed film version of the Tennessee Williams play The Glass Menagerie, with John Malkovich and Joanne Woodward, in 1987.

In 1988, Allen returned to the big screen as Bill Murray's long-lost love, Claire, in the Christmas comedy Scrooged. While the film initially earned a mixed response from critics upon its release, it was a major box office success. In 1990, she portrayed the doomed crew member Christa McAuliffe in the television movie Challenger, based on the 1986 Space Shuttle Challenger disaster. Subsequently, she appeared in Spike Lee's Malcolm X (1992), in a small supporting role in The Perfect Storm (2000) and In the Bedroom (2001). She made guest appearances on Law & Order (1996) and Law & Order: Special Victims Unit (2001). She also starred in the short-lived series The Road Home (1994), and portrayed Dr. Clare Burton in the video game Ripper (1996). In 2014 she played the role of Betty Lowe in "Unfinished Business", the 13th episode of the 4th season of the CBS police procedural drama Blue Bloods.

Allen reprised her best-known role as Marion Ravenwood for the 2008 sequel Indiana Jones and the Kingdom of the Crystal Skull, in which she renews her relationship with Indiana Jones and reveals to him that they have a son named Henry Jones III, who named himself Mutt Williams, played by Shia LaBeouf. The film was a critical and commercial success.

Allen starred in the American premiere of Jon Fosse's A Summer Day at the Cherry Lane Theater in New York City, which opened in October 2012.

Allen has a long-standing relationship with the Berkshire Theater Group. It began in 1981, when she appeared in the play Two for the Seesaw at the Berkshire Theater Festival in Stockbridge, Massachusetts. She has also appeared in a summer production of the nearby Williamstown Theater Festival. In August 2015, Allen directed Terrence McNally's Frankie and Johnny in the Clair de Lune for the Berkshire Theater Group. In 2016, Allen made her movie directing debut with the short film, A Tree. A Rock. A Cloud., based on the short story by Carson McCullers. It won the Best International Short at the Manchester Film Festival in March 2017. Allen played the lead role in 2017's Year by the Sea, a film based on The New York Times bestselling memoir by Joan Anderson.

Allen reprised her role as Marion Ravenwood one last time in 2023's Indiana Jones and the Dial of Destiny.

In 2024, she starred in Unsinkable: Titanic Untold as Nancy Smith, the wife of U.S. Senator William Alden Smith.

== Personal life ==
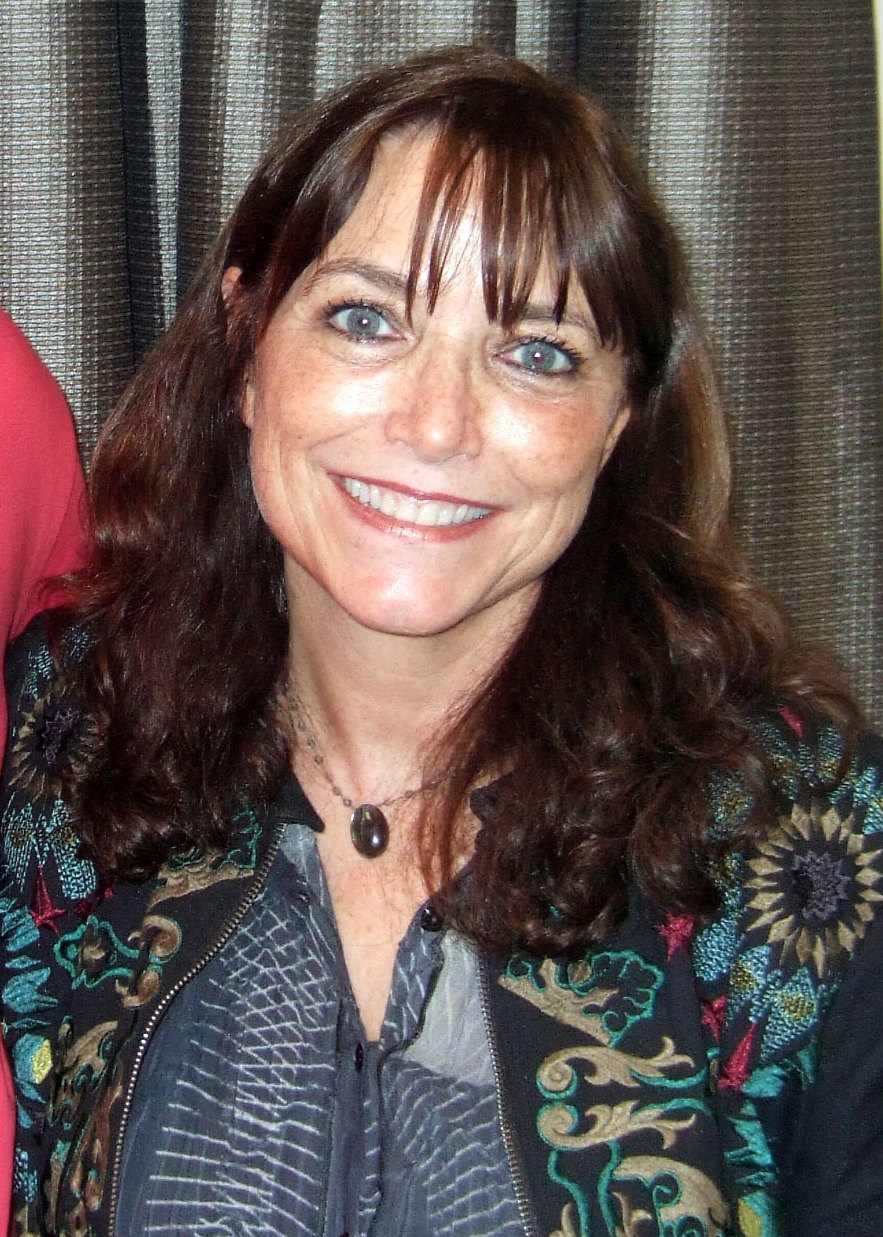
Allen at the Chiller Theatre Expo in 2013

In 1976, Allen dated writer and musician Terence Winch. He wrote a fictionalized account of their relationship in "The Age of Transition", a story in his collection, Contenders. She married actor Kale Browne in 1988 and had a son, Nicholas, in 1990. The couple divorced in 1998. Following the birth of her son, Allen accepted smaller roles in TV and films to concentrate on raising him. Nicholas went on to become a personal chef and win a Chopped competition on Food Network, which aired on December 22, 2016.

In 2003, Allen started her own textile company, Karen Allen Fiber Arts, in Great Barrington, Massachusetts. The company has a store in Great Barrington that sells items Allen knits with a Japanese-made knitting machine and products made by other designers. For her work in the textile arts, she was awarded an honorary master's degree from the Fashion Institute of Technology in 2009.

Allen also taught acting at Bard College at Simon's Rock, located in Great Barrington.

As of July 2015, Allen lives in Massachusetts. She also works as a stage director.

== Filmography ==
=== Film ===
Year	Title	Role
1978	National Lampoon's Animal House	Katy
1979	Manhattan	Television Actor No. 2
1979	The Wanderers	Nina
1980	Cruising	Nancy Gates
1980	A Small Circle of Friends	Jessica Bloom
1981	Raiders of the Lost Ark	Marion Ravenwood
1982	Shoot the Moon	Sandy
1982	Split Image	Rebecca/Amy
1984	Until September	Mo Alexander
1984	Starman	Jenny Hayden
1987	Terminus	Gus
1987	The Glass Menagerie	Laura Wingfield
1988	Backfire	Mara McAndrew
1988	Scrooged	Claire Phillips
1989	Animal Behavior	Alex Bristow
1991	Sweet Talker	Julie Maguire
1992	The Turning	Glory Lawson
1992	Malcolm X	Miss Dunne
1993	The Sandlot	Mrs. Smalls
1993	King of the Hill	Miss Mathey
1993	Ghost in the Machine	Terry Munroe
1996	Ripper (Note: An interactive movie point-and-click adventure game)	Dr. Claire Burton
1997	'Til There Was You	Betty Dawkan
1998	Falling Sky	Resse Nicholson
2000	The Basket	Bessie Emery
2000	Wind River	Martha
2000	The Perfect Storm	Melissa Brown
2001	World Traveler	Delores
2001	In the Bedroom	Marla Keyes
2003	Briar Patch	Butcher Lee
2004	Poster Boy	Eunice Kray
2004	When Will I Be Loved	Alexandra Barrie
2008	Indiana Jones and the Kingdom of the Crystal Skull	Marion Ravenwood
2010	White Irish Drinkers	Margaret
2015	Bad Hurt	Elaine Kendall
2016	Year by the Sea	Joan Anderson
2019	Colewell	Nora Pancowski
2021	Things Heard & Seen	Mare Laughton
2022	A Stage of Twilight	Cora
2023	Indiana Jones and the Dial of Destiny	Marion Ravenwood
2024	Unsinkable	Nancy Smith
2024	The Easy Kind	Kathy
2026	Other Mommy	Grandma Ruth Martin

=== Television ===
Year	Title	Role	Notes
1978	Lovey: A Circle of Children, Part II	Elizabeth	Television film
1979	Knots Landing	Annie	Episode: "Pilot"
1981	East of Eden	Abra	Episode: "Part Three"
1986	Alfred Hitchcock Presents	Jackie Foster	Episode: "The Creeper"
1990	Challenger	Christa McAuliffe	Television film
1990	Secret Weapon	Ruth	Television film
1993	Rapture	Georgianne Corcoran	Television film
1993	Voyage	Catherine "Kit" Norvell	Television film
1994	The Road Home	Alison Matson	6 episodes
1996	Hostile Advances: The Kerry Ellison Story	Margaret	Television film
1996	Law & Order	Judith Sandler	Episode: "Survivor"
1997	All the Winters That Have Been	Helen Raven	Television film
2001	Law & Order: Special Victims Unit	Paula Varney	Episode: "Scourge"
2001	My Horrible Year!	Belinda Faulkner	Television film
2001	Shaka Zulu: The Citadel	Katherine Farewell	Television film
2009	A Dog Year	Paula (voice)	Television film
2010	November Christmas	Claire	Television film
2012	The Tin Star	Eliza Flynn	Television film
2014	Blue Bloods	Betty Lowe	Episode: "Unfinished Business"
2020	50 States of Fright	Sheriff Stallings	3 episodes
2022	The Last Movie Stars	Frances Woodward (voice)	3 episodes

== Awards and nominations ==
Year	Awards	Category	Nominated work	Result	Ref.
1981	Saturn Awards	Best Actress	Raiders of the Lost Ark	Won	
1983	Theatre World Award	Outstanding New York City Stage Debut Performance	Monday After the Miracle	Won	
1984	Saturn Awards	Best Actress	Starman	Nominated	
1988	3rd Independent Spirit Awards	Best Supporting Female	The Glass Menagerie	Nominated	
1990	Sant Jordi Awards	Best Foreign Actress	The Glass Menagerie	Nominated	
2009	AARP Movies for Grownups Awards	Best Grownup Love Story (Over 50's) (shared with Harrison Ford)	Indiana Jones and the Kingdom of the Crystal Skull	Nominated	
2016	Hamilton International Film Festival	Best Actress	Year by the Sea	Won	
2020	35th Independent Spirit Awards	Best Female Lead	Colewell	Nominated	
2020	Chlotrudis Awards	Best Actress	Colewell	Nominated	
2022	Woods Hole Film Festival Awards	Best Performance in a Feature Film (Adult) (shared with William Sadler)	A Stage of Twilight	Won	
