= Gotham Independent Film Awards 2022 =

Annual US film awards ceremony

32nd Annual Gotham Awards
- Date: November 28, 2022
- Location: Cipriani Wall Street, New York
- Country: United States
- Presented by: The Gotham Film & Media Institute

Highlights
- Most wins: Everything Everywhere All at Once (2)
- Most nominations: Tár (5)
- Best Feature: Everything Everywhere All at Once
- Breakthrough Director: Charlotte Wells – Aftersun

The 32nd Annual Gotham Awards, presented by The Gotham Film & Media Institute, were held on November 28, 2022. The nominees were announced on October 25, 2022, by Angelica Ross and Jeffrey Sharp. Actors Adam Sandler and Michelle Williams, filmmaker Gina Prince-Bythewood, film executives Jason Cassidy and Peter Kujawski, entrepreneur Don Katz, and the cast of Fire Island all received tribute awards. Additionally, actor and filmmaker Sidney Poitier was posthumously recognized with the Icon Tribute award.

== Winners and nominees ==
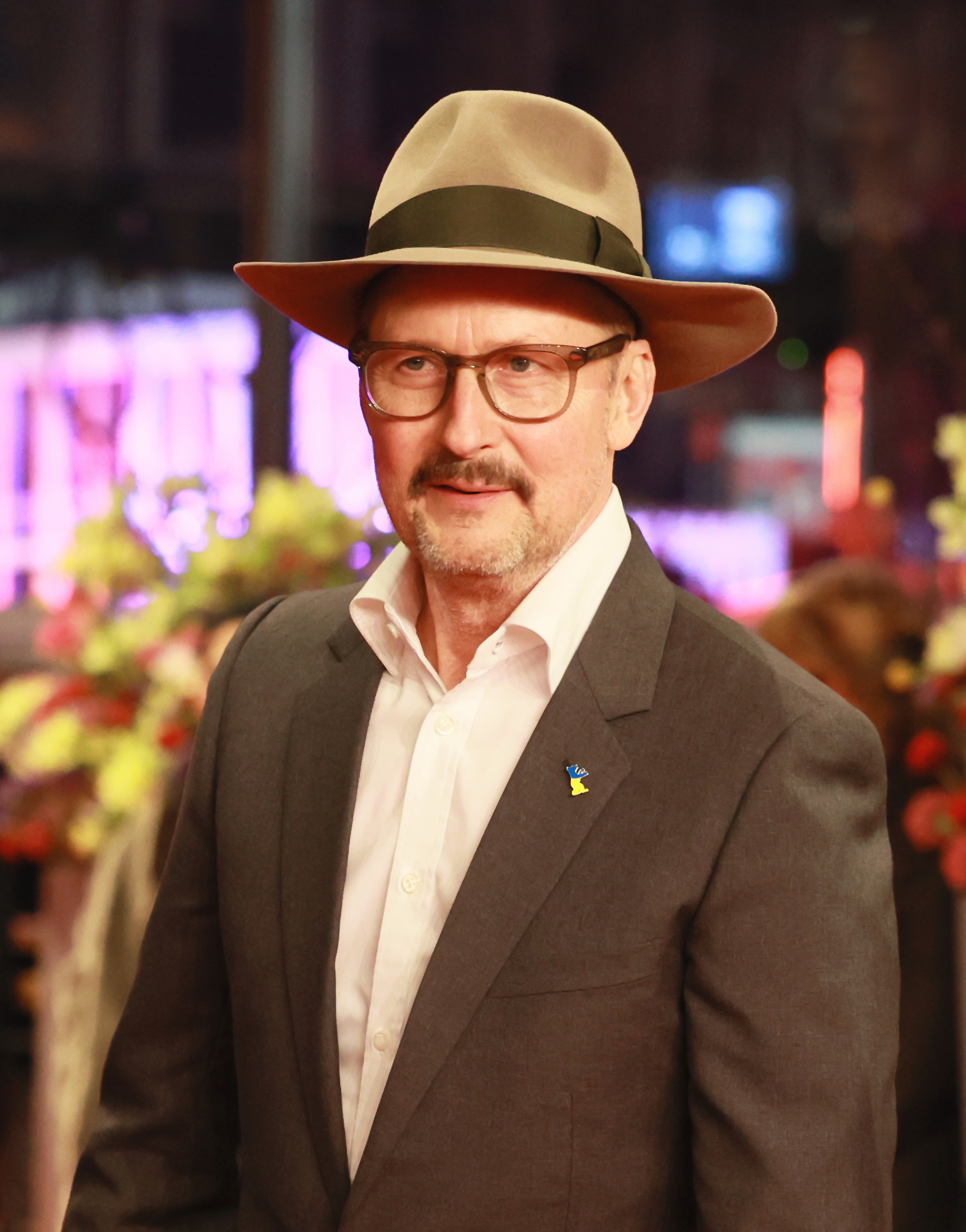
Todd Field, Best Screenplay winner

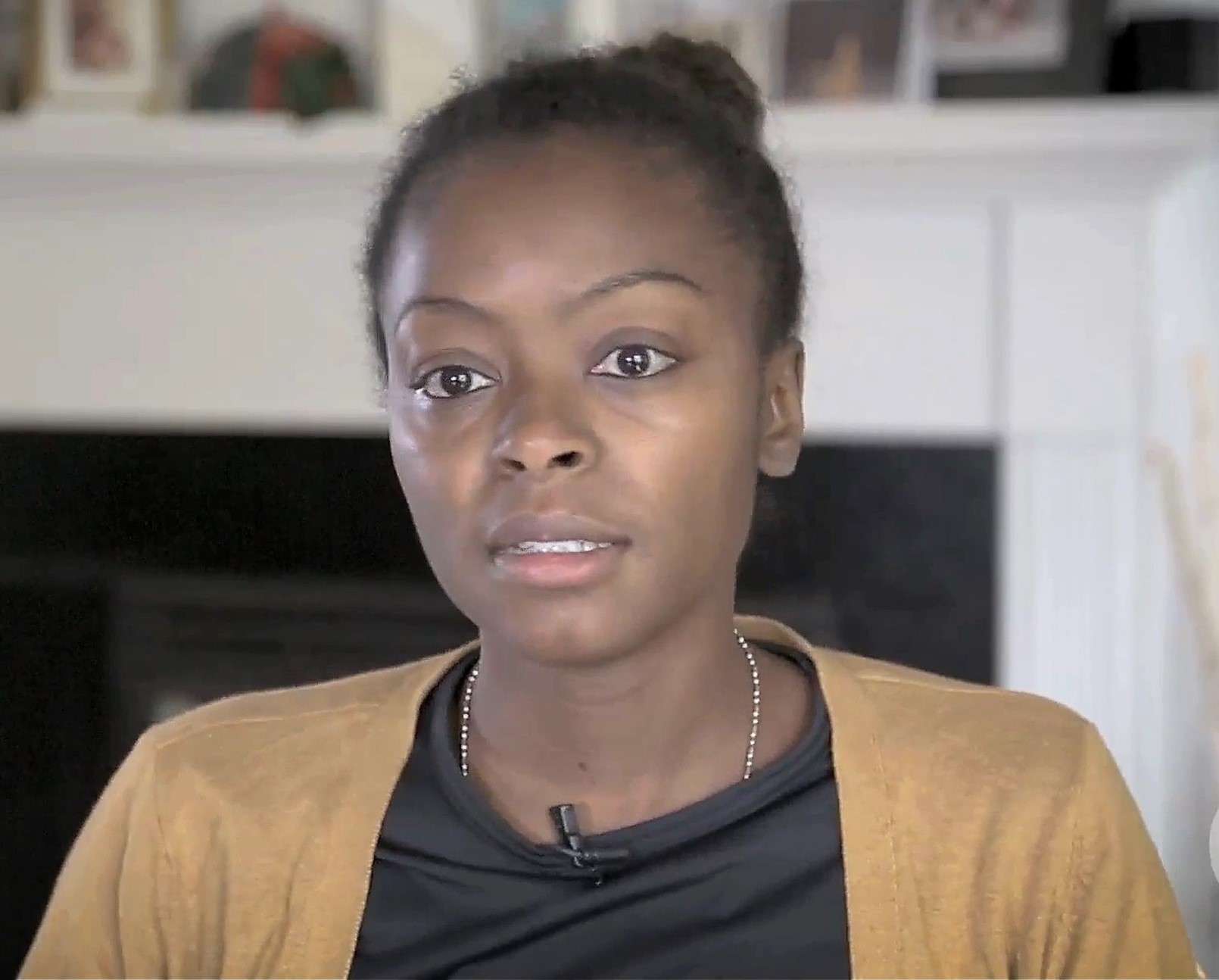
Danielle Deadwyler, Outstanding Lead Performance winner

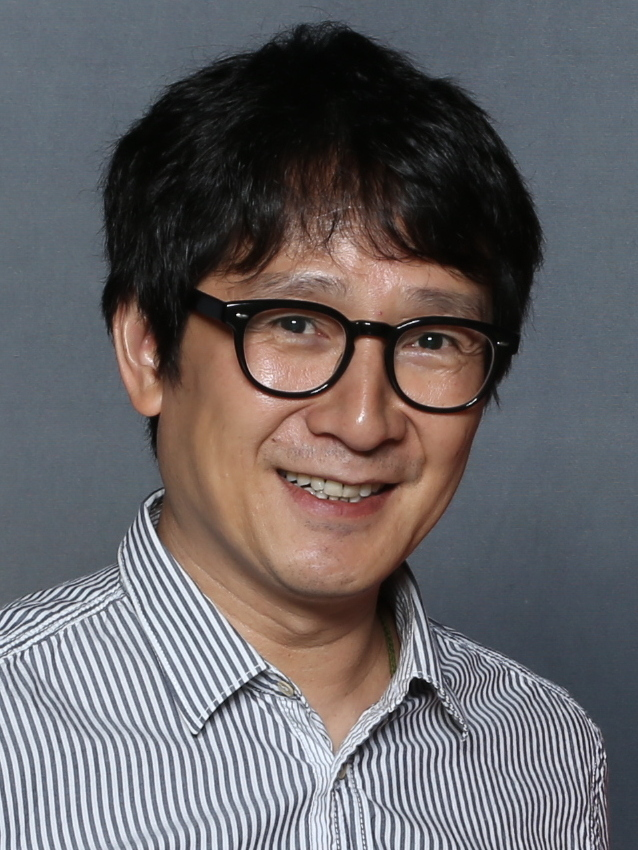
Ke Huy Quan, Outstanding Supporting Performance winner

=== Film ===
Best Feature: Everything Everywhere All at Once; Aftersun; The Cathedral; Dos Estaciones; Tár	Best Screenplay: Tár – Todd Field; After Yang – Kogonada; Armageddon Time – James Gray; Catherine Called Birdy – Lena Dunham; Women Talking – Sarah Polley
Best Documentary Feature: All That Breathes; All the Beauty and the Bloodshed; I Didn't See You There; The Territory; What We Leave Behind	Best International Feature: Happening; Athena; The Banshees of Inisherin; Corsage; Decision to Leave; Saint Omer
Breakthrough Director: Charlotte Wells – Aftersun; Elegance Bratton – The Inspection; Beth de Araújo – Soft & Quiet; Owen Kline – Funny Pages; Antoneta Alamat Kusijanović – Murina; Jane Schoenbrun – We're All Going to the World's Fair	Breakthrough Performer: Gracija Filipović – Murina as Julija; Anna Cobb – We're All Going to the World's Fair as Casey; Frankie Corio – Aftersun as Sophie Paterson; Anna Diop – Nanny as Aisha; Kali Reis – Catch the Fair One as Kaylee
Outstanding Lead Performance: Danielle Deadwyler – Till as Mamie Till-Mobley; Cate Blanchett – Tár as Lydia Tár; Dale Dickey – A Love Song as Faye; Colin Farrell – After Yang as Jake; Brendan Fraser – The Whale as Charlie; Paul Mescal – Aftersun as Calum Paterson; Thandiwe Newton – God's Country as Sandra Guidry; Aubrey Plaza – Emily the Criminal as Emily Benetto; Taylor Russell – Bones and All as Maren Yearly; Michelle Yeoh – Everything Everywhere All at Once as Evelyn Quan Wang	Outstanding Supporting Performance: Ke Huy Quan – Everything Everywhere All at Once as Waymond Wang; Jessie Buckley – Women Talking as Mariche; Raúl Castillo – The Inspection as Laurence Harvey; Hong Chau – The Whale as Liz; Brian Tyree Henry – Causeway as James; Nina Hoss – Tár as Sharon Goodnow; Noémie Merlant – Tár as Francesca Lentini; Mark Rylance – Bones and All as Sully; Gabrielle Union – The Inspection as Inez French; Ben Whishaw – Women Talking as August

==== Films with multiple wins and nominations ====
Film that received multiple wins
Wins	Film
2	Everything Everywhere All at Once

Films that received multiple nominations
Nominations	Film
5	Tár
4	Aftersun
3	Everything Everywhere All at Once
3	The Inspection
3	Women Talking
2	After Yang
2	Bones and All
2	Murina
2	We're All Going to the World's Fair
2	The Whale

=== Television ===
Breakthrough Series – Long Form: Pachinko; Severance; Station Eleven; This Is Going to Hurt; Yellowjackets	Breakthrough Series – Short Form: Mo; Abbott Elementary; As We See It; Rap Sh!t; Somebody Somewhere
Breakthrough Nonfiction Series: We Need to Talk About Cosby; The Andy Warhol Diaries; The Last Movie Stars; Mind Over Murder; The Rehearsal	Outstanding Performance in a New Series: Ben Whishaw – This Is Going to Hurt as Adam Kay; Bilal Baig – Sort Of as Sabi Mehboob; Ayo Edebiri – The Bear as Sydney Adamu; Janelle James – Abbott Elementary as Ava Coleman; Minha Kim – Pachinko as Teenage Kim Sunja; Matilda Lawler – Station Eleven as Young Kirsten Raymonde; Britt Lower – Severance as Helly R.; Melanie Lynskey – Yellowjackets as Shauna Shipman; Zahn McClarnon – Dark Winds as Joe Leaphorn; Sue Ann Pien – As We See It as Violet Wu

== Special awards ==
=== Ensemble Tribute ===
- Fire Island – Nick Adams, Joel Kim Booster, Margaret Cho, Tomás Matos, Torian Miller, Zane Phillips, Conrad Ricamora, Matt Rogers, James Scully, and Bowen Yang

=== Filmmaker Tribute ===
- Gina Prince-Bythewood

=== Gotham Impact Salute ===
- Venice Film Festival

=== Icon Tribute ===
- Sidney Poitier (posthumous)

=== Industry Tribute ===
- Jason Cassidy and Peter Kujawski

=== Innovator Tribute ===
- Don Katz

=== Performer Tribute ===
- Adam Sandler
- Michelle Williams

== See also ==
- 38th Independent Spirit Awards
