= Isidore Bethel =

French-American filmmaker

- Born: Atlanta, United States
- Citizenship: United States; France
- Education: Harvard; École Normale Supérieure; SAIC
- Occupations: filmmaker; professor
- Years active: 2011–present
- Works: Acts of Love; What We Leave Behind; Of Men and War
- Honors: Filmmaker's 25 New Faces; Chéries-Chéris Jury Prize; DOC NYC "40 Under 40"; Gotham nominee

Isidore Bethel is a French-American filmmaker who was among Filmmaker's "25 New Faces of Independent Film" in 2020 and DOC NYC's "40 Under 40" in 2023. The films he edits, directs, and produces use filmmaking to make sense of overwhelming experiences and tackle recurrent themes of displacement, sexuality, aging, trauma, grief, therapy, and art-making. His first feature film as director, Liam, premiered at the Boston LGBT Film Festival in 2018 and received the Jury Prize in the documentary section of the Paris LGBTQ+ Film Festival. His second film, Acts of Love, which French actor Francis Leplay co-directed, premiered at Hot Docs, received the Tacoma Film Festival's Best Feature Award, and appeared on MovieWeb's list of the top LGBTQ+ films of 2021.

Films he has edited have screened at Cannes, SXSW, and the Berlinale, in museums such as the Museum of Modern Art, the Beirut Art Center, and the Pompidou Center, and on broadcast platforms such as POV, The New York Times' Op-Docs, and Netflix. He has worked in France, Mexico, and the United States with directors such as Dominique Cabrera, Jean-Xavier de Lestrade, Juan Pablo González, Laurent Bécue-Renard, Juan Manuel Sepúlveda, Daniel Hymanson, and Iliana Sosa. He has also collaborated with filmmakers in Lebanon, the United Kingdom, Ethiopia, India, and Turkey. He acts as a producer on many of the films that he edits, which have received support from the Sundance Institute, the Ford Foundation, Field of Vision, the CNC in France, Doc Society, Film4 and The Whickers in the UK, and Mexico's IMCINE and FONCA funds. Critics have characterized his editing as demonstrative of "admirable restraint," "tender," "astute," "energized yet never rushed," and "elegant."

He has served on juries for the Paris LGBTQ+ Film Festival, the Chicago International Film Festival, and the National Film Festival for Talented Youth.

A graduate of Harvard University, the École Normale Supérieure, and the School of the Art Institute of Chicago, Bethel has received funding from the Institut Français, France's Île-de-France region, the Jean-Luc Lagardère Foundation, and the Jack Kent Cooke Foundation as well as support from Berlinale Talents, the Tribeca Film Institute, the Villa Medici, the Gotham, Film Independent, the Logan Nonfiction Program, and Eurodoc. He has taught at Stone Soup's filmmaking workshop, Sundance's Art of Editing fellowship, Sarah Lawrence College's Paris campus, La Fémis, and Parsons Paris.

== Filmography ==
=== Feature films ===
| Year | Title | Editor | Director | Producer | Writer | Notes |
|---|---|---|---|---|---|---|
| 2013 | Grandir | Yes | No | No | No | Directed by Dominique Cabrera. ACID Cannes. |
| 2014 | Of Men and War | Yes | No | Yes | No | Credited as associate producer. Directed by Laurent Bécue-Renard. Cannes Film Festival. |
| 2016 | La Balada del Oppenheimer Park | Yes | No | Yes | No | Directed by Juan Manuel Sepúlveda. Best Documentary nominee at the Mexican Academy Awards. |
| 2018 | Caballerango | Yes | No | No | No | Directed by Juan Pablo González. IDFA. |
| 2018 | Liam | No | Yes | Yes | Yes | Jury Prize at the Paris LGBTQ+ Film Festival. |
| 2020 | So Late So Soon | Yes | No | Yes | No | Credited as associate producer. Directed by Daniel Hymanson. True/False. |
| 2021 | Acts of Love | No | Yes | Yes | Yes | Co-directed with Francis Leplay. Hot Docs. |
| 2022 | What We Leave Behind | Yes | No | Yes | Yes | Directed by Iliana Sosa. Louis Black "Lone Star" and Fandor New Voices Awards at SXSW, Gotham nominee. |
| 2023 | Hummingbirds | Yes | No | Yes | No | Credited as co-producer. Directed by Silvia Del Carmen Castaños and Estefanía Contreras. Generation 14plus Grand Prize at the Berlinale, Independent Spirit nominee. |
| 2023 | The Taste of Mango | Yes | No | No | No | Directed by Chloe Abrahams. BFI London Audience Award, BIFA for Best Debut Director, BAFTA longlist. |

=== Short films ===
| Year | Title | Editor | Director | Producer | Writer | Notes |
|---|---|---|---|---|---|---|
| 2011 | "Someone I Love or Someone Who I Want to Be" | Yes | Yes | Yes | Yes | Harvard Hoopes Prize. |
| 2013 | "Goat Milk" | Yes | No | No | No | Directed by Dominique Cabrera. Montpellier Mediterranean Film Festival. |
| 2016 | "We Eat the Earth/The Earth Eats Us" | Yes | No | Yes | No | Credited as associate producer. Directed by Lucy Pawlak. Athens Digital Arts Festival. |
| 2016 | "We Died and Here We Are" | Yes | No | Yes | No | Directed by Mohamad Kanaan. Ashkal Alwan's Video Works 2016 at the Beirut Art Center. |
| 2021 | "Some Kind of Intimacy" | Yes | No | Yes | Yes | Directed by Toby Bull. Sundance London. |
| 2022 | "Blue Room" | Yes | No | Yes | No | Credited as associate producer. Directed by Merete Mueller. AFI Fest. |
| 2022 | "Suddenly TV" | Yes | No | No | No | Credited as consulting editor. Directed by Roopa Gogineni. Documentary Short Special Jury Award at SXSW. |
| 2025 | "Rehearsal for an Encounter" | Yes | No | Yes | No | Directed by Dahee Kim. New/Next Film Festival. |
| 2025 | "Wi Cyah Stay" | Yes | No | Yes | No | Directed by Nordia Hunt. Trinidad and Tobago Film Festival. |
