= Liam (disambiguation) =

Liam is a masculine given name of Irish origin.

Liam may also refer to:

- Liam (2000 film), directed by Stephen Frears, a drama about a family in poverty in Dublin
- Liam (2018 film), a French documentary film by Isidore Bethel
- "Liam", a song by the German band In Extremo
- "Liam", a song by Swedish DJ Eric Prydz from his album Opus
- Liam, a mascot of Yahoo! Mail
- Liam MacCarthy Cup, for the winners of the All-Ireland Senior Hurling Championship
- Liam the Leprechaun, a character appears in YouTube comedy series Annoying Orange

== See also ==
- List of people with given name Liam
