= Spaceman (2024 film) =

Film by Johan Renck

- Release poster
- Directed by: Johan Renck
- Screenplay by: Colby Day
- Based on: Spaceman of Bohemia by Jaroslav Kalfař
- Produced by: Michael Parets; Channing Tatum; Reid Carolin; Peter Kiernan; Timothy Headington; Lia Buman; Max Silva
- Starring: Adam Sandler; Carey Mulligan; Kunal Nayyar; Lena Olin; Isabella Rossellini; Paul Dano
- Cinematography: Jakob Ihre
- Edited by: Scott Cummings; Simon Smith; John Axelrad
- Music by: Max Richter
- Production companies: Tango Entertainment; Free Association; Sinestra
- Distributed by: Netflix
- Release dates: February 20, 2024 (Berlinale); February 23, 2024 (United States)
- Running time: 107 minutes
- Country: United States
- Language: English
- Budget: $40 million

Spaceman is a 2024 American science fiction drama film directed by Johan Renck and written by Colby Day. It is based on the 2017 novel Spaceman of Bohemia by Jaroslav Kalfař. Starring Adam Sandler, Carey Mulligan, Kunal Nayyar, Lena Olin, Isabella Rossellini, and Paul Dano, it follows an astronaut sent on a mission to the edge of the Solar System who encounters a creature that helps him resolve his earthly problems.

Spaceman premiered at the 74th Berlin International Film Festival on February 21, 2024, and received a limited theatrical release on February 23, 2024, before its streaming debut by Netflix on March 1, 2024. The film received mixed reviews.

== Plot ==
Czech cosmonaut Jakub Procházka is six months into a space mission to investigate a mysterious cloud of dust and particles, called Chopra, lying beyond Jupiter. The Czech mission has arrived shortly before a competing South Korean mission. Jakub struggles with loneliness and misses his wife, Lenka, who has recently stopped talking with him after he left her and their unborn daughter behind to go on the mission.

Lenka sends him a message telling him that she wants to leave him, but Commissioner Tuma, Jakub's commanding officer, prevents it from reaching him, to prevent Jakub's mental state from worsening. Days later, still without news from Lenka, Jakub finds a spider-like creature with telepathic abilities inside a compartment of the ship. The creature, whom Jakub names Hanuš, (Note: The novel has Jakub choose the name Hanuš, telling the alien the apocryphal story that a clockmaker named Hanuš constructed the Prague astronomical clock.) wishes to understand humans better and to help Jakub with his loneliness.

Exploring his memories, Hanuš learns more about Jakub: his father was an informant of the state party and was killed when Jakub was young. He met Lenka, but often neglected her, being more focused on his career as a cosmonaut, going as far as leaving her when she suffered a miscarriage. After showing Jakub an implanted memory of the miscarriage, which Jakub was not present for, Hanuš, disappointed with humanity, leaves the ship, leaving Jakub distressed.

Jakub arranges with Petr, a technician and good friend of his, to deliver a message to Lenka, asking for forgiveness for his neglect. Hanuš returns after this, revealing that he's dying due to a parasitic infection that wiped out his entire species.

The two finally arrive at the Chopra cloud, which is revealed to be a leftover of the beginning of the universe and where every moment of time exists simultaneously. Hanuš leaves to die in space, but Jakub goes after him. Within the cloud, Jakub comes to the conclusion that he wishes only to be with his wife. She appears to him in a forest scene as a rusalka. Hanuš dies due to the infection.

Jakub is rescued by the South Korean space vessel. Jakub and Lenka talk again, coming to terms with their relationship.

== Cast ==
- Adam Sandler as Jakub (pronounced Yah-koob) Procházka
- Carey Mulligan as Lenka, Jakub's pregnant wife
- Paul Dano as the voice of Hanuš,(prononunced Hah-noosh) an extraterrestrial spider
- Kunal Nayyar as Petr, a technician
- Isabella Rossellini as Commissioner Tuma, Jakub's commanding officer
- Lena Olin as Zdena, Lenka’s mother

== Production ==
In October 2020, Netflix announced that the novel Spaceman of Bohemia would be adapted by screenwriter Colby Day into a feature film of the same name directed by Johan Renck and starring Adam Sandler. In April 2021, Carey Mulligan was added to the cast, and the film was retitled Spaceman. On April 19, 2021, it was announced that Paul Dano and Kunal Nayyar joined the cast.

Principal photography began on April 19, 2021, in New York City, and wrapped on July 1, 2021, in the Czech Republic. In the Czech Republic, filming took place in Prague and surrounding areas of the country's Central Bohemian Region.

Max Richter composed the soundtrack. On February 22, 2024, the track "Don’t Go Away", a collaboration between Richter and the American band Sparks, which features in the film, was released to streaming services.

== Release ==
Spaceman had its world premiere at the 74th Berlin International Film Festival in the Berlinale Special section on February 20, 2024.

The film was released on March 1, 2024, its originally planned release date in 2023 was delayed due to the impact of the 2023 SAG-AFTRA strike.

== Reception ==
On the review aggregator website Rotten Tomatoes, 50% of 135 critics' reviews are positive, with an average rating of 5.5/10. The website's consensus reads: "Spaceman's poignant themes are partly brought to life by sensitive performances from a talented cast, but it fails to consistently engage with its most interesting ideas." Metacritic, which uses a weighted average, assigned the film a score of 55 out of 100, based on 35 critics, indicating "mixed or average" reviews.

In a positive review for RogerEbert.com, Robert Daniels praised Sandler's performance, writing, "I just love Sandler in this register. It’s no longer a surprise when he pulls a well-defined and memorable dramatic performance." In a mixed review for IGN, Siddhant Adlakha wrote, "Its visual artistry—which goes to great lengths to establish mood, and uneasy emotional equilibrium—is swiftly laid low by its dependence on the literal, nullifying whatever abstractions its sci-fi premise might come to briefly represent."
