= Acts of Love (film) =

2021 documentary-fiction film by Isidore Bethel

- Directed by: Isidore Bethel; Francis Leplay
- Produced by: Lucie Rego; Pauline Tran Van Lieu; Jamie Gonçalves; Francis Leplay; Isidore Bethel
- Cinematography: Ryan Saunders
- Edited by: Francis Leplay
- Production companies: Hutong Productions; Sin Sitio Cine
- Distributed by: Outplay Films, Here TV
- Release date: April 29, 2021 (Hot Docs)
- Running time: 71 minutes
- Countries: France; United States
- Language: English

Acts of Love is a 2021 documentary-fiction hybrid film by Isidore Bethel and Francis Leplay that premiered in Hot Docs's Nightvision section, which focuses on future "cult classics."

== Plot ==
When his relationship with an older man in Mexico starts to wane, Bethel, who performs as himself in the film, travels to Chicago. He chats with hundreds of men on dating apps and invites them to make a film with him. A dozen meet him for an interview, and four agree to write and perform in a fictional film that their original conversations inspired.

Meanwhile, passages combining still images and voiceover from Bethel recount memories about the former lover. Throughout, the filmmaker's mother phones him to critique and ridicule her son's unusual project. Describing his collaboration with Bethel in an interview with the Mexican newspaper Reforma, Leplay said, "The first thing I asked him was, 'how spontaneous were these auditions?' And far from being acted, they were quite natural. There wasn't a specific script, but that's how the story came about."

== Production ==
The film received screenwriting and postproduction support from France's Île-de-France region, Eurodoc, and the Thessaloniki Documentary Festival's work-in-progress lab.

== Reception ==
Filmmaker magazine included Bethel on its 2020 list of the "25 New Faces of Independent Film" in recognition of his work on Acts of Love. Upon its premiere, the film received positive press from several publications and blogs, including The Moveable Fest, Xtra Magazine, KinoCulture Montréal, One Movie, Our Views, and ForReel Movie News and Reviews. The Hollywood Reporter wrote that "this exciting, genre-bending film...stands out in its exploration of attraction, desire, sex and intimacy."

Now characterized it as "a bold, brave look at intimacy, honesty and the power dynamics that exist both in interpersonal relationships and between artist and subject." Point of View Magazine noted that Acts of Love "is a thoughtful study of love and heartbreak, but ultimately a celebration of savouring the encounters that define us throughout our journeys." Now, Yohomo, and The Queer Review included the film on their lists of Hot Docs festival recommendations. The film received press throughout its festival run, including from Il manifesto, Lifo, Cult MTL, and WCPT.

== Festivals ==
After its premiere, the film screened at several other festivals, including the Thessaloniki Documentary Festival, Queer Lisboa, RIDM, the Paris LGBTQ+ Film Festival, and the Chicago, Transilvania, and St. Louis International Film Festivals. It received the Tacoma Film Festival's Best Documentary Feature Award and a Special Mention at Milan's Gender Border Film Festival, figured among Payal Kapadia's top-five films of 2021, and ranked #4 on MovieWeb's list of Top 10 LGBTQ+ Movies of 2021. Here TV released the film in the United States in 2022.
