= Grandir =

- Directed by: Dominique Cabrera
- Edited by: Isidore Bethel; Marc Daquin
- Production company: Ad Libitum
- Distributed by: Splendor Films
- Release date: March 21, 2013 (Cinéma du Réel)
- Running time: 93 minutes
- Country: France
- Languages: French, English

Grandir is a 2013 first-person French documentary film by Dominique Cabrera. The film, whose working title was O Happy Days! (Ô Heureux jours !), is a follow-up to the filmmaker's 1995 film diary Tomorrow and Tomorrow Again (Demain et encore demain). In Grandir, Cabrera expanded her diaristic approach, starting by filming family at her brother's wedding in Massachusetts. According to the filmmaker, this was a way of appreciating them more deeply, cherishing them while they're alive. From there, the filmmaker continued recording events and gatherings – holidays, births, and her father's funeral – in the hopes of grappling with family secrets, which might explain her anxiety and persistent insomnia. She also traveled to Algeria with her sister to investigate the mysterious conditions surrounding their mother's birth.

Cabrera met one of the film's editors, Isidore Bethel, when she was a visiting professor in Harvard's film program and advising his undergraduate thesis. Bethel also concurrently edited Cabrera's short film "Goat Milk," which focuses on grief and Cabrera's interactions with family living in Massachusetts.

== Reception ==
Grandir premiered at the Cinéma du Réel, where it won the festival's Potemkine Prize, before screening at the La Rochelle International Film Festival and ACID Cannes. It received favorable press coverage from Le Monde, Télérama, Critikat, Culturopoing, and Challenges. Splendor Films released the film in theaters in France, and Potemkine Films released it on DVD. The Institut Français in London screened Grandir in 2016. A 2021 retrospective of Cabrera's work at the Pompidou Center included the film with an introduction from fellow autobiographical filmmaker Ross McElwee.
