= Focus Features =

American independent film and distribution company

Focus Features LLC
- Type: Division
- Industry: Film
- Predecessors: PolyGram Filmed Entertainment; Interscope Communications; Gramercy Pictures; Good Machine; October Films; Rogue Pictures; USA Films; Universal Focus; FilmDistrict
- Founded: May 3, 2002; 24 years ago
- Founder: James Schamus; David Linde
- Headquarters: Universal City, California, United States
- Key people: Peter Kujawski (chairman); Jason Cassidy (vice-chairman)
- Products: Motion pictures
- Parent: Universal Pictures
- Divisions: Focus World
- Website: focusfeatures.com

Focus Features LLC is an American independent film production and distribution company, owned by Comcast as a unit of Universal Pictures, which is itself a unit of Comcast's division NBCUniversal. Founded in 2002, Focus Features distributes independent and foreign films in the United States and internationally.

In November 2018, The Hollywood Reporter named Focus Features "Distributor of the Year" for its success behind the year's breakout documentary film Won't You Be My Neighbor? and Spike Lee's BlacKkKlansman. The studio's most successful film to date is Obsession (2026), which has grossed $519 million at the worldwide box office so far.

Focus Features' films have yielded numerous awards nominations. Its 175 Academy Award nominations include 19 for Best Picture, with 35 Oscar wins across various categories. However, as of 2026, Focus Features ranks as the distributor with the most Best Picture nominations without a win. (Note: This total does not include nominees released by Focus Features in some or all countries outside the United States and Canada: Anora, which won the award at the 97th Academy Awards, The Brutalist, La La Land, Lady Bird, and Manchester by the Sea.)

== History ==
Focus Features was founded in 2002 by James Schamus and David Linde and formed from the divisional merger of USA Films, Universal Focus and Good Machine, as well as several assets of the Vivendi-affiliated film studio StudioCanal. USA Films was created by Barry Diller in 1999, when he purchased Interscope Communications, certain assets of the film division of Propaganda Films, October Films and Gramercy Pictures from Seagram and merged the three labels together; USA Films was led by Scott Greenstein. Universal Focus was the specialty film arm of Universal Pictures that was created in 1999 as Universal Classics, which was led by Paul Hardart and Claudia Gray, to replace the October Films label in order to get a group of titles to be distributed by USA Films, focused on the marketing of niche-based acquisitions by Universal Pictures International, Working Title, WT2 Productions, Revolution Films and DNA Films, and eventually rebranded into Universal Focus by 2000.

In March 2004, Focus Features revived Rogue Pictures as a genre label, which was once used by October Films in the late 1990s. Rogue Pictures would be led by the same team who led the standard Focus management. The first film released under this label was Seed of Chucky.

=== 2010s ===
In August 2011, Focus Features launched Focus World, a label focusing on the video on demand (VOD) market with initial plans to distribute eight to 15 films per year, with one film being released per month. The first titles released under this label were Russian film Black Lightning and Brazilian film Adrift.

On October 2, 2013, James Schamus was fired from his position as CEO of Focus, with the New York offices being shut down in the process. He was succeeded by Peter Schlessel, whose company FilmDistrict would be merged into Focus and folded into the trade name High Top Releasing. This became effective in January 2014, and several titles developed under FilmDistrict would be released by Focus. Under Schlessel, the company began to acquire films with a wider commercial appeal, much like his previous company.

In May 2015, Gramercy Pictures was revived by Focus as a genre label, that was on action, sci-fi, and horror films.

In February 2016, Focus merged with Universal Pictures International Productions (UPIP) as part of a new strategy to "align the acquisition and production of specialty films in the global market". Following this, along with several disappointing box office returns, Schlessel was let go from the company and replaced with UPIP Managing Director Peter Kujawski. This shift would lead to several Oscar-winning movies, such as The Theory of Everything (2014), The Danish Girl (2015), Darkest Hour (2017), and Phantom Thread (2017), as well as auteur-driven films like Tom Ford's Noctural Animals (2016) and Sofia Coppola's The Beguiled (2017).

In 2018, with the release of Morgan Neville's Mister Rogers bio, Won't You Be My Neighbor?, and Spike Lee's BlacKkKlansman, Focus grossed about $150 million domestically, leading the studio specialty labels. With its international business, which included foreign distribution on films like Manchester by the Sea (2016) and Lady Bird (2017), it grossed almost $500 million worldwide.

=== 2020s ===
In March 2022, Focus Features celebrated its 20th anniversary by unveiling a new logo, a tribute reel featuring some of its most celebrated movies—Lost in Translation (2003), Brokeback Mountain (2005), Milk (2008), The Kids Are All Right (2010), Phantom Thread (2017), and Promising Young Woman (2020)—and a "swag bag" with a collection of 20 Focus films for talent, filmmakers, and industry insiders.

In November 2022, The Gotham Film & Media Institute announced that Focus Features’ Chairman, Peter Kujawski and Vice Chairman, Jason Cassidy would receive the Industry Tribute during the 32nd annual Gotham Awards Ceremony.

In January 2025, it was announced that Focus Features was nearing a deal to produce an adaptation of the 1997 horror-thriller novel Audition by Ryū Murakami and the Japanese cult horror classic Audition (1999).

On October 18, 2025, Focus Features launched FocusFest, an immersive one-day festival experience on the Universal Studios lot in Los Angeles. The event featured several Focus films, including an advance screening of Yorgos Lanthimos’ Bugonia (2025).

In March 2026, at the 98th Academy Awards, Jessie Buckley won Best Actress for Focus Features’ Hamnet, while Bugonia and Song Sung Blue received four and one nominations, respectively.

In April 2026, first footage from Robert Eggers' third film at Focus, upcoming period horror film Werwulf, was unveiled during the Universal and Focus Features presentation at CinemaCon in Las Vegas. That same month, early reviews for Morgan Neville's documentary about Saturday Night Live (SNL) creator Lorne Michaels were beginning to come out.

== Filmography ==
Focus' most successful release both domestically and worldwide is Obsession (2026), which the company acquired for $15 million and has earned $525 million at the box office to date, surpassing Downton Abbey (2019), which earned $194.6 million. Fifty Shades of Grey (2015) is the studio's biggest success as a production company at over $569 million worldwide. The animated film Coraline (2009) was also highly profitable for the company, earning $188,110,696 worldwide on a $60 million budget.

Despite having its share of unsuccessful releases, Focus has been consistently profitable, and its international sales arm (unusual among specialty film divisions) allows it to receive the foreign and domestic revenues from its releases. Its home video sales in addition are boosted by their array of cult classics (most were acquired from its predecessor companies), such as The Big Lebowski (1998) (Note: Acquired from PolyGram Filmed Entertainment.), Wet Hot American Summer (2001) (Note: Acquired from USA Films.), and most recently, The Northman (2022).

=== Highest-grossing films ===
Rank	Title	Year	Worldwide Gross
1	Obsession	2026	$525,840,715
2	Downton Abbey	2019	$194,694,725
3	Coraline	2009	$188,110,696
4	Nosferatu	2024	$181,954,339
5	Brokeback Mountain	2005	$179,141,120
6	Burn After Reading	2008	$163,728,902
7	Darkest Hour	2017	$150,847,274
8	Pride & Prejudice	2005	$131,906,659
9	Atonement	2007	$129,266,061
10	Conclave	2024	$127,848,258
11	The Theory of Everything	2014	$123,726,688
12	The Pianist	2002	$120,098,945
13	Lost In Translation	2003	$118,688,972
14	Insidious Chapter 3 (Note: Released under the Gramercy Pictures label.)	2015	$112,983,889
15	Hamnet	2025	$108,788,322
16	The Boxtrolls	2014	$108,255,770
17	Downton Abbey: The Grand Finale	2025	$107,929,546
18	ParaNorman	2012	$107,307,220
19	Atomic Blonde	2017	$100,014,025
20	BlacKkKlansman	2018	$93,413,709
21	Downton Abbey: A New Era	2022	$92,651,384
22	The Constant Gardener	2005	$82,468,097
23	Tinker Tailor Soldier Spy	2011	$81,515,369
24	The Other Boleyn Girl	2008	$78,201,830
25	Kubo And The Two Strings	2016	$76,249,438

== Student short film showcase ==
Focus Features has partnered with Jet Blue, Soho House, and The Gotham Film & Media Institute to create an annual program that helps emerging filmmakers.

The program is open to Master of Fine Arts (MFA) students who have completed a short film in their last three academic years. Winning filmmakers receive a grant and an invitation to the Gotham Awards in Manhattan. In recent years, they also have the opportunity for their film to be shown on Focus Features' YouTube channel and/or digital streaming platform.

The 2025–2026 showcase marked the program's seventh year. It received projects from 20 graduate film schools. A special jury of filmmakers and curators selected the four winning filmmakers, who were recognized during the 2025 Gotham Film Awards.

== Focus World ==
Focus World is distribution and production arm of Focus Features that focuses on cinema and VOD market.

Focus World
- Type: Division
- Founded: 2011
- Founder: James Schemus and David Linde
- Successor: Focus Features

== See also ==
- Rogue
- FilmDistrict
- Sony Pictures Classics
- Stage 6 Films
- Searchlight Pictures
