= The Ballad of Oppenheimer Park =

2016 Mexican documentary film by Juan Manuel Sepúlveda

- Spanish: La Balada del Oppenheimer Park
- Directed by: Juan Manuel Sepúlveda
- Produced by: Isidore Bethel, Elsa Reyes, Juan Manuel Sepúlveda
- Cinematography: Juan Manuel Sepúlveda
- Edited by: Isidore Bethel; León Felipe González
- Production companies: Fragua Cine, Zensky Cine
- Distributed by: IMCINE, Torch Films
- Release date: March 2, 2016 (FICCI)
- Running time: 71 minutes
- Country: Mexico
- Languages: English, Cree

The Ballad of Oppenheimer Park (Spanish: La Balada del Oppenheimer Park) is a 2016 Mexican documentary film by Juan Manuel Sepúlveda. It chronicles the lives of several First Nations people occupying Oppenheimer Park in Vancouver's Downtown Eastside. They rest, recreate, perform, and protest in the park, on land that belonged to their ancestors. Throughout, they tease the filmmaker, who spent two years filming in the park, and use performance to ridicule stereotypical representations of their identities. The film is experimental in its narrative structure and plays with Western genre tropes.

== Reception ==
The film premiered at FICCI in 2016 and received the Riviera Maya Film Festival's and Zanate Film Festival's Grand Prizes, the Málaga Film Festival's Best Documentary Award, and Special Mentions at the Cinéma du Réel, DocsMX (Mexico City International Documentary Film Festival), and FIDOCS. It received a Best Documentary nomination at the 59th Ariel Awards. Critics have praised the film for its humor and intensity and for Sepúlveda's closeness to those who appear in it. Le Monde's Jacques Mandelbaum wrote that it "evokes the most shocking and poignant images imaginable." The Hollywood Reporter noted that "some could accuse the director of making 'poverty porn' by focusing on so much debauchery and idleness, but as The Ballad of Oppenheimer Park progresses, the socio-political implications of the people and place depicted become increasingly clear." According to The Georgia Straight, the film "captured camaraderie in hard times, dark humour in the face of oppression, and, more than anything else, simple community."
