= Nadia and the Hippos =

1999 film

- Directed by: Dominique Cabrera
- Written by: Dominique Cabrera; Philippe Corcuff
- Produced by: Gilles Sandoz
- Starring: Ariane Ascaride
- Cinematography: Hélène Louvart
- Edited by: Sophie Brunet
- Release date: 15 May 1999
- Running time: 102 minutes
- Country: France
- Language: French

Nadia and the Hippos (French: Nadia et les hippopotames) is a 1999 French drama film directed by Dominique Cabrera. It was screened in the Un Certain Regard section at the 1999 Cannes Film Festival.

== Cast ==
- Ariane Ascaride - Nadia
- Marilyne Canto - Claire
- Thierry Frémont - Serge
- Philippe Fretun - Jean-Paul
- Najd Hamou-Medja - Christopher
- Olivier Gourmet - Andre
- Pierre Berriau - Gérard
- Laurent Arnal - Sébastien
- Michel Bony - Un cheminôt
- Sasha Nakache - Christopher bis I
- Ruben Nakache - Christopher bis II
