= What We Leave Behind (2022 film) =

2022 documentary film by Iliana Sosa

- Directed by: Iliana Sosa
- Written by: Iliana Sosa; Isidore Bethel
- Produced by: Emma D. Miller; Iliana Sosa; Isidore Bethel (co-producer)
- Cinematography: Judy Phu; Monica Wise Robles; Iliana Sosa
- Edited by: Isidore Bethel
- Production companies: Borderchild Productions; Marcona Media
- Distributed by: ARRAY; Netflix
- Release date: March 11, 2022 (SXSW)
- Running time: 71 minutes
- Countries: United States; Mexico
- Language: Spanish

What We Leave Behind is a 2022 documentary film directed by Iliana Sosa. The film is a portrait of Sosa's grandfather, Julián Moreno, as he starts building a house in the Mexican state of Durango. As a younger man, Julián had spent decades living between the United States and Mexico, first working as a bracero and later traveling by bus to visit his children and grandchildren in the Southwestern United States. In the film, Julián revisits this past with his granddaughter as the two forge a tighter bond together. Voiceovers from the director punctuate the film and pair with imagery of the local landscape; the soundtrack features an a cappella song by the Cardencheros de Sapioriz, who are also from Durango.

The film received development, production, and post-production support from several institutions, including the Ford Foundation’s JustFilms, the Sundance Institute, the IDA, the Austin Film Society, the True/False & Catapult Rough Cut Retreat, the Jacob Burns Film Center, the Gotham Documentary Lab, the University of Texas at Austin, and the Ji.hlava New Visions Forum.

== Reception ==
The film premiered at SXSW, where it received the Fandor New Voices Award and the Louis Black "Lone Star" Award. It then screened at several other festivals, including Full Frame, First Look, and the Camden, Guanajuato, and Morelia International Film Festivals. It earned several other awards, including Thin Line Fest's Emerging Filmmaker Award and a Special Mention at the Tacoma Film Festival. The film received a Best Documentary nomination at the Gotham Awards.

ARRAY released the film in theaters in the United States, and it debuted on Netflix in the United States, Canada, United Kingdom, Australia, and New Zealand on September 30, 2022.

The film met with "universal acclaim" from critics, according to its Metacritic score of 89. It has a 100% rating on Rotten Tomatoes, both among critics and audiences. The Hollywood Reporter characterized the film as "first-person filmmaking at its eloquent best." The Boston Globe called it a "limpid, emotionally deep, and poetically resonant documentary." Several writers praised the film for its understated takes on migration, the US-Mexico border, and second-generation and diasporic experience. It featured on the Los Angeles Times' list of recommendations for the Los Angeles Latino International Film Festival, and The New York Times named it a Critic's Pick.
