= Mistress Dispeller =

2024 film

- U.S theatrical release poster
- Directed by: Elizabeth Lo
- Produced by: Elizabeth Lo; Emma D. Miller; Maggie Li
- Cinematography: Elizabeth Lo
- Edited by: Charlotte Munch Bengtsen
- Music by: Brian McOmber
- Production companies: After Argos Films; Marcona Media; Impact Partners; Anonymous Content; Chicago Media Project; The Concordia Fellowship; Tempo Wubato Productions
- Distributed by: Oscilloscope
- Release dates: September 2, 2024 (Venice); October 22, 2025 (United States)
- Running time: 94 minutes
- Countries: United States; China
- Languages: English; Mandarin
- Box office: $140,522

Mistress Dispeller is a 2024 American-Chinese documentary film, directed and produced by Elizabeth Lo. It follows a woman in China who hires a professional to go undercover and break up her husband's affair.

It had its world premiere at the 81st Venice International Film Festival on September 2, 2024, in the Orizzonti section. It was released in the United States on October 22, 2025, by Oscilloscope.

== Premise ==
A woman in China hires a professional "mistress dispeller" to break up her husband's affair.

== Production ==
In September 2022, it was announced Elizabeth Lo would direct a documentary film about Mistress Dispellers, with Anonymous Content and Impact Partners set to finance and produce. The Concordia Studio Fellowship, Field of Vision, and One in a Billion Productions provided additional support for the film. Constance Wu serves as an executive producer under her Tempo Wubato Productions banner.

== Release ==
It had its world premiere at the 81st Venice International Film Festival on September 2, 2024, in the Orizzonti section. It screened at the 2024 Toronto International Film Festival on September 6, 2024. In March 2025, Oscilloscope acquired distribution rights to the film. It was released in the United States on October 22, 2025.

== Reception ==
On the review aggregator website Rotten Tomatoes, 95% of 43 critics' reviews are positive. The website's consensus reads: "Functioning equally well as a sociological survey and an intimate character study, Mistress Dispeller is an absorbing documentary filled with fresh insights into the complexities of marriage."
