= In the Blink of an Eye (2026 film) =

2026 film by Andrew Stanton

- Release poster
- Directed by: Andrew Stanton
- Written by: Colby Day
- Produced by: Jared Ian Goldman
- Starring: Kate McKinnon; Rashida Jones; Daveed Diggs
- Cinematography: Ole Birkeland
- Edited by: Mollie Goldstein
- Music by: Thomas Newman
- Production companies: Searchlight Pictures; Mighty Engine
- Distributed by: Hulu
- Release dates: January 26, 2026 (Sundance); February 27, 2026 (Worldwide)
- Running time: 94 minutes
- Country: United States
- Language: English

In the Blink of an Eye is a 2026 American science fiction drama film directed by Andrew Stanton and written by Colby Day. It stars Kate McKinnon, Rashida Jones, and Daveed Diggs.

Filmed in 2023, In the Blink of an Eye features three separate storylines: one follows a family in prehistory, one a romance in the 21st century, and one an astronaut's journey through space in the distant future.

The film premiered at the 2026 Sundance Film Festival on January 26, 2026, where it won the Alfred P. Sloan Prize. It was released by Hulu on February 27, 2026, and received negative reviews from critics.

== Plot ==
=== 47,000 BC ===
A family of Neanderthals consists of father Thorn, pregnant mother Hera, daughter Lark, and younger child Ebb. However, a bad fall leaves Thorn in critical condition, and he barely survives thanks to Hera's efforts. Tragedy strikes nonetheless when Lark finds Ebb dead, leaving the family grief-stricken, and again when, after giving birth to a healthy baby, Hera fails to recover from the process and passes away, leaving only Thorn, Lark, and the newborn child.

The family later spots a group of other people; they attempt to flee, but the group catches up with them. Thankfully, those people, who are homo sapiens, are friendly and welcome them to their village. The family of Neanderthals live in harmony with the homo sapiens for many years, with Lark marrying one and having children of her own. After a long, fulfilling life, Thorn passes away in his sleep, and is buried with a family heirloom in hand: a necklace he made from an acorn that Lark found and played with as a child.

=== 21st century ===
In 2025, Claire is a Canadian PhD student in anthropology at Princeton researching the remains of a Paleolithic man, in what she believes might be game-changing research. She is in the early stages of a romantic relationship with Greg, who studies statistics, but she struggles with opening up and tends to shun or even avoid him. As they finally grow closer, Claire learns that her mother is dying, and must move to Canada to care for her in her final years. Although she strongly considers breaking up, she and Greg instead transition to a long-distance relationship.

An unknown amount of time later, after Claire's mother has died, Greg moves in with her in Canada, from where she continues to work remotely on her research. By 2030, the two have a son together named David and Claire is pregnant again. Many years later David, now an adult, leads the research started by his mother and announces to the world that the project has finally culminated in a way to extend human life expectancy to a degree far beyond its current state. His parents, who proudly watched the presentation, gift him with the item held by the Paleolithic man on whom her research had started, a tool in the shape of an acorn. (Note: Therefore implying that the body is Thorn's.) The couple happily grows old together, until Greg dies, and then Claire.

=== Future ===
In the distant future, as the world is ending, a last-hope mission is launched, sending scientist and astronaut Coakley, engineered to live an extended life, (Note: Implied to be the result of the research of Claire.) on a 226-year mission in the sole company of AI co-pilot Rosco. They are meant to, upon closing in on a new hospitable planet, Kepler-16b, give life to embryos in stasis that are to establish a new home for humanity. Because prolonged life was eventually ruled detrimental by humanity, these new humans would have lifespans similar to those prior to the discovery of life-extending methods.

When the greenhouse meant to produce oxygen for the ship suffers a contamination, the only two last-chance scenarios Coakley and Rosco come up with to secure the future of the embryos include the death of one of the duo. Both want to be the one to sacrifice themselves, but Coakley is eventually convinced to follow Rosco's plan: to permanently turn off Rosco and use the IA room as a backup greenhouse. Coakley reluctantly does so, tearfully sharing farewells with the AI.

About a century later, as the ship closes in on its destination, Coakley brings the embryos to life, naming the firstborn V, to whom she gifts a trinket in the form of an acorn, meant to represent humanity's future. (Note: Implied to be the same acorn-shaped tool featured in the other two storylines.) The ship lands, and the planet is hospitable and fitting to the mission's plan.

Many years later, humans have established a stable and harmonious colony. V dies an elderly woman, with the trinket still worn on a collar around her neck during her funeral. Still having many years left to live, Coakley delivers a eulogy in which she reflects on V and humanity, which has come so far despite being, relative to the lifespan of the universe, as brief as the blink of an eye.

== Cast ==
- Kate McKinnon as Coakley, a scientist and astronaut researching plant life aboard spaceships
- Rashida Jones as Claire Robertson, an anthropologist researching Paleolithic remains
- Daveed Diggs as Greg, Claire's love interest
- Tanaya Beatty as Hera, a Paleolithic woman, Lark's mother
- Jorge Vargas as Thorn, a Paleolithic man, Hera's partner and Lark's father
- Skywalker Hughes as Lark
- Tatyana Rose Baptiste as Adult Lark
- Andrea Bang as adult V
- Yeji Kim as V (5 years old)
- Rhona Rees as the voice of Rosco

== Production ==
It was first announced in October 2022 that Andrew Stanton had signed on to direct a film written by Colby Day for Searchlight Pictures, which cited the films 2001: A Space Odyssey (1968), Magnolia (1999) and Interstellar (2014) as influences for the story. Kate McKinnon, Rashida Jones, Daveed Diggs, Jorge Vargas, Tanaya Beatty and Skywalker Hughes were among the cast announced to star in the film in March 2023.

Principal photography began on March 24, 2023 in Vancouver, and wrapped up on May 16, 2023.

== Music ==
In March 2024, Thomas Newman was hired to compose the score, after previously scoring Stanton's Pixar films Finding Nemo (2003), WALL-E (2008), and Finding Dory (2016).

== Release ==
In the Blink of an Eye premiered at the Sundance Film Festival, on January 26, 2026, followed by a worldwide streaming release on February 27, 2026, on Hulu.

== Reception ==
=== Critical response ===
On the review aggregator website Rotten Tomatoes, 16% of 55 critics' reviews are positive, with an average rating of 4.6/10. The website's consensus reads: "Aiming high in ambition but scoring low in execution, In the Blink of an Eye is a sprawling meditation on the human condition that turns up few compelling revelations." Metacritic, which uses a weighted average, assigned the film a score of 37 out of 100, based on 16 critics, indicating "generally unfavorable" reviews.

Bilge Ebiri of Vulture was critical of the lack of connection with the characters but praised the use of visual textures and storytelling, making "In the Blink of an Eye is so ambitious that a rather dramatic artistic balancing act is required to make it all work." Siddhant Adlakha of Variety wrote "Both as drama and as science fiction, In the Blink of an Eye doesn’t probe these questions, but rather, drops definitive answers like anvils, leaving little room to ruminate, wrestle, or consider." Brian Tallerico of RogerEbert.com noted that the film had "so many humanist ideas that it becomes really tempting to give it a pass on that basis alone" such as people connecting to the past and future as a species in a fertile ground, but added "whether it’s the pandemic, a rushed production, the business upheaval at Searchlight, or something else entirely, that ground just never got enough water to make this work."

A. A. Dowd of Empire wrote "Meditating drippily on the grand cycle of life, In The Blink Of An Eye plays more like Cloud Atlas as a self-help seminar." Adrian Horton of The Guardian considered the film to be "tediously boring – too limp, uninspired and barren to conjure any of the requisite wonder for the persistence of life" calling it equivalent to "watching paint dry on the cave wall." Richard Lawson of The Hollywood Reporter felt the plots being "so broad and generic" and considered "much more powerful to see really detailed, specific stories identified as parts of a grandly universal human experience." Chase Hutchinson of IGN felt that the film has "little ambition and even less genuine wonder." David Ehrlich of IndieWire felt that the film was not "significantly worse than" John Carter but "bad enough to make you long for the days when Hollywood was willing to risk embarrassing itself at that scale".

Alissa Wilkinson of The New York Times admitted that the film could have developed into a miniseries, as it had lack of space for the characters and felt that it often gives the impression "it’s trying to get you to feel rather than letting you feel, with swelling music and montages of people experiencing emotion, signaling what you’re supposed to be experiencing, too." Damon Wise of Deadline Hollywood felt it an echo of Stanton's previous experience with the failure of John Carter that sent him to the "Director's Jail" and ultimately considered the film to be "woolly and sentimental as this to take [Stanton] anywhere except backwards, to Director’s Siberian Gulag." Jake Kleinman of Polygon felt each piece of the film "uniquely flawed" but mentioned the director and writer's greatest sin being "failing to bring them together in a clever way".

Embedo Ashibeze of Screen Rant said that Thomas Newman's score, Ola Maslik's production design and Ole Birkeland's cinematography helped in saving the film from being "forgettable". Sean Rinn of SLUG wrote that "Stanton and Day fail to realize that the beauty of humanity is in the uniqueness and specificity of each individual experience, not in some universal story that encompasses everyone and everything". Jake Cole of Slant Magazine said that Stanton failed to add anything new in the genre, which felt like a similar tread to Cloud Atlas and The Tree of Life. In a positive review, G. Allen Johnson of San Francisco Chronicle added that "Stanton is a dreamer, with an unshakeable faith in humanity" which was proven through this film.

=== Accolades ===
The film won the Sundance festival's Alfred P. Sloan Prize, which is awarded annually to the best depiction of science, technology, engineering, and math themes in a film screening during the festival. It also received a $25,000 cash award from the Sundance Institute with support from the Alfred P. Sloan Foundation.
