= Francis Leplay =

French actor and novelist (born 1967)

- Born: 25 July 1967 (age 59); Saint-Mandé, France
- Citizenship: France
- Education: France's National Academy of Dramatic Arts, Sciences Po
- Occupations: Actor; novelist; film director
- Years active: 1995 – present
- Works: Kings and Queen, Farewell, My Queen, Acts of Love

Francis Leplay is a French actor, film director and novelist.

== Education and career ==
An alumnus of France's National Academy of Dramatic Arts and Sciences Po, Leplay began acting on television in episodes of the French detective series Julie Lescaut and Navarro. His first film role was in Laurence Ferreira Barbosa's J'ai horreur de l'amour (I Hate Love) in 1997.

His career took off in the 2000s, and he soon started acting in films by directors including Sofia Coppola, Noémie Lvovsky, Arnaud Desplechin, and Benoît Jacquot as well as in the television series Spiral.

Leplay has also acted in theater productions with directors Denis Podalydès and Lambert Wilson in venues including Lincoln Center, the Mossovet Theatre, and the Bouffes du Nord.

The Éditions du Seuil published two of his novels, 2006's Après le spectacle, a work of autofiction comparing intermittent acting work and romantic uncertainty, and 2009's Samuel et Alexandre, which follows two men staking out the bounds of their friendship.

In 2021, Leplay and French-American filmmaker Isidore Bethel co-directed the docufiction hybrid film Acts of Love, which premiered at the Hot Docs Canadian International Documentary Festival.

== Filmography ==
=== Film, as director ===
| Year | Title | Festivals/Prizes |
|---|---|---|
| 2021 | Acts of Love by Isidore Bethel and Francis Leplay | Hot Docs Canadian International Documentary Festival |

=== Film, as actor ===
| Year | Title | Role | Festivals/Prizes |
|---|---|---|---|
| 1995 | Raï by Thomas Gilou | | Golden Leopard at Locarno |
| 1997 | J'ai horreur de l'amour (I Hate Love) by Laurence Ferreira Barbosa | member of association | Prix de la jeunesse (Youth Film Prize) at Cannes |
| 1999 | Time Regained by Raúl Ruiz | Jupien's employee | in competition at Cannes |
| 2001 | Les Morsures de l'aube (Love Bites) by Antoine de Caunes | photographer | |
| 2002 | Ma caméra et moi by Christophe Loizillon | the young man | ACID Cannes |
| 2003 | Sole Sisters by Pierre Jolivet | Philippe Jean | BFI London |
| 2004 | Kings and Queen by Arnaud Desplechin | Christian | Venice, Louis Delluc Prize |
| 2006 | Marie Antoinette by Sofia Coppola | delivery doctor in Provence | Cannes' National Education Prize |
| 2007 | La Vie d'artiste by Marc Fitoussi | Alice's brother-in-law | Deauville's Michel d'Ornano Award |
| 2007 | Très bien, merci by Emmanuelle Cuau | emergency internist | Fajr's Special Jury Award |
| 2007 | The Price to Pay by Alexandra Leclère | real estate agent | Shanghai |
| 2007 | Intrusions by Emmanuel Bourdieu | Pierre Marsac, lawyer | |
| 2008 | Modern Love by Stéphane Kazandjian | Hervé | |
| 2010 | Imogène McCarthery by Alexandre Charlot and Franck Magnier | Gowen Ross | |
| 2011 | Farewell, My Queen by Benoît Jacquot | the Count of Artois | Berlinale, Louis Delluc Prize |
| 2011 | Mon arbre by Bérénice André | Jean-Marc | |
| 2012 | Looking for Hortense by Pascal Bonitzer | Marco | Venice |
| 2013 | Bright Days Ahead by Marion Vernoux | the oenology professor | Toronto |
| 2014 | Three Hearts by Benoît Jacquot | the doctor | Venice, Toronto |
| 2015 | Les Cowboys by Thomas Bidegain | the train man | Cannes |
| 2016 | Nelly by Anne Émond | Mathieu | Toronto |
| 2017 | Demain et tous les autres jours by Noémie Lvovsky | Mr. Lesieur | Locarno |
| 2018 | Un violent désir de bonheur by Clément Schneider | the abbot | ACID Cannes |
| 2019 | Who You Think I Am by Safy Nebbou | Serge | Berlinale |
| 2020 | My Best Part by Nicolas Maury | | Cannes |
| 2024 | The Good Teacher by Teddy Lussi-Modeste | Musil | |
| 2025 | The Money Maker by Jean-Paul Salomé | Victor | |

=== Television, as actor ===
| Year | Title |
|---|---|
| 2007–2017 | Fais pas ci, fais pas ça by Anne Giafferi and Thierry Bizot |
| 2007 | La Résistance by Félix Olivier |
| 2007 | L'Affaire Sacha Guitry by Fabrice Cazeneuve |
| 2008 | Seule by Félix Olivier |
| 2012–present | Spiral by Alexandra Clert and Guy-Patrick Sainderichin |
| 2013 | Drumont, histoire d'un antisémite français by Emmanuel Bourdieu |
| 2017 | Ce que vivent les roses by Frédéric Berthe |
| 2018 | Victor Hugo, ennemi d'État by Jean-Marc Moutout |
| 2019 | Jeux d'influence by Jean-Xavier de Lestrade |
| 2020 | Black and White by Moussa Sene Absa |

== Stage ==
| Year | Title | Theater |
|---|---|---|
| 2005 | Les Chiens de conserve by Roland Dubillard | Théâtre du Rond-Point, Arles |
| 2007 | Le Mental de l'équipe by Emmanuel Bourdieu and Frédéric Bélier-Garcia and directors Frédéric Bélier-Garcia and Denis Podalydès | Amiens |
| 2008 | Music-hall by Jean-Luc Lagarce and director Lambert Wilson | Bouffes du Nord |
| 2010 | La Fausse Suivante by Pierre de Marivaux and director Lambert Wilson | Bouffes du Nord |
| 2013 | Le Prix des boîtes by Frédéric Pommier and director Jorge Lavelli | Théâtre de l'Athénée |
| 2010 | Le Bourgeois gentilhomme by Molière and director Denis Podalydès | Bouffes du Nord, on tour at the Royal Opera of Versailles and Lincoln Center |

== Novels ==
| Year | Title | Publisher |
|---|---|---|
| 2006 | Après le spectacle | Éditions du Seuil |
| 2009 | Samuel et Alexandre | Éditions du Seuil |
