= Emma D. Miller =

American documentary filmmaker

- Born: U.S.
- Occupations: Director, Producer
- Years active: 2016–present

Emma D. Miller is an American documentary filmmaker. She was listed in DOC NYC's "40 Under 40" in 2022 and was the recipient of the Sundance Institute Producers Lab Fellowship in 2023. In 2024, she was named one of Filmmaker Magazine's "25 New Faces of Independent Film".

== Career ==
In 2012, Emma graduated from Duke University, where she was a Robertson Scholar. She is the founder of the production company Marcona Media.

Emma produced What We Leave Behind, which premiered at South by Southwest in 2022, winning two Special Jury Awards, and received a Gotham Award nomination for Best Documentary Feature. She directed the documentary short The School of Canine Massage, which premiered at South by Southwest in 2024. She also produced the documentary Mistress Dispeller, which premiered at the 81st Venice International Film Festival and the Toronto International Film Festival in 2024.

== Personal life ==
Emma is married to screenwriter Colby Day.

== Filmography ==
| Year | Title | Contribution | Note |
|---|---|---|---|
| 2017 | Knife Skills | Associate producer | Documentary |
| 2017 | Unrest | Associate producer | Documentary |
| 2019 | Couples Therapy | Casting associate | TV Series |
| 2022 | What We Leave Behind | Producer | Documentary |
| 2024 | The School of Canine Massage | Director and producer | Documentary |
| 2024 | Mistress Dispeller | Producer | Documentary |

== Awards and nominations ==
| Year | Result | Award | Category | Work | Ref. |
|---|---|---|---|---|---|
| 2022 | Won | South by Southwest | Fandor New Voices Award | What We Leave Behind | |
| 2022 | Won | South by Southwest | Louis Black "Lone Star" Award | What We Leave Behind | |
| 2022 | Nominated | South by Southwest | Documentary Spotlight | What We Leave Behind | |
| 2022 | Nominated | Gotham Awards | Best Documentary Feature | What We Leave Behind | |
| 2024 | Nominated | South by Southwest | Documentary Short | The School of Canine Massage | |
| 2024 | Won | New Orleans Film Festival | Best Documentary Feature | Mistress Dispeller | |
| 2025 | Nominated | Cinema Eye Honors Awards | Outstanding Achievement in Production | Mistress Dispeller | |
