= So Late So Soon =

2020 documentary film by Daniel Hymanson

- Theatrical release poster
- Directed by: Daniel Hymanson
- Produced by: Trace Henderson; Josh Penn; Kellen Quinn; Noah Stahl
- Starring: Don Seiden; Jackie Seiden
- Cinematography: Daniel Hymanson
- Edited by: Isidore Bethel
- Music by: Zachary Seman
- Production companies: Department of Motion Pictures; Hedgehog Films
- Distributed by: Oscilloscope
- Release dates: March 5, 2020 (True/False); November 19, 2021 (United States)
- Running time: 71 minutes
- Country: United States
- Language: English

So Late So Soon is a 2020 American documentary film, director Daniel Hymanson's first feature. It is a portrait of Chicago artists Jackie and Don Seiden in their later years as health issues jeopardize their life together in a multicolored Victorian house, which had become a work of art in itself over the course of their 50-year marriage – as well as an icon in Chicago's Rogers Park neighborhood. Though primarily observational in form, the film includes several moments of interaction with Hymanson as well as scenes that draw on archival footage, some of which the Seidens recorded themselves. Hymanson first met Jackie Seiden as a child, enrolling in her classes at the School of the Art Institute of Chicago. Don Seiden also taught at the Art Institute and founded its art therapy program.

The film's production took place off and on over five years and received support from the Sundance Institute, Kartemquin Labs, the Illinois Arts Council, and IFP.

== Release ==
The film premiered at the True/False Film Fest in 2020 and went on to screen at DOC NYC, BAFICI, Big Sky, Indie Memphis, Ashland, and the Calgary Underground Film Festival, where it received a Special Jury Prize for Documentary Filmmaking.

Oscilloscope acquired the film’s worldwide rights before distributing it theatrically in the United States. In March 2023, So Late So Soon had its streaming premiere on The Criterion Channel.

== Reception ==
Across its festival run and theatrical release, the film met with a favorable response in outlets such as Filmmaker, The Hollywood Reporter, The Capital Times, Paste, Senses of Cinema, RogerEbert.com, Vox, and VOX Magazine. Critics have commended the film for the intimacy it achieves with its protagonists and for an associative narrative structure, evocative of how memory and emotion operate.

IndieWire selected the film as a Critic's Pick and the IDA Awards shortlisted it for Best Feature in 2021.
