= Colby Day =

American filmmaker, screenwriter, and playwright

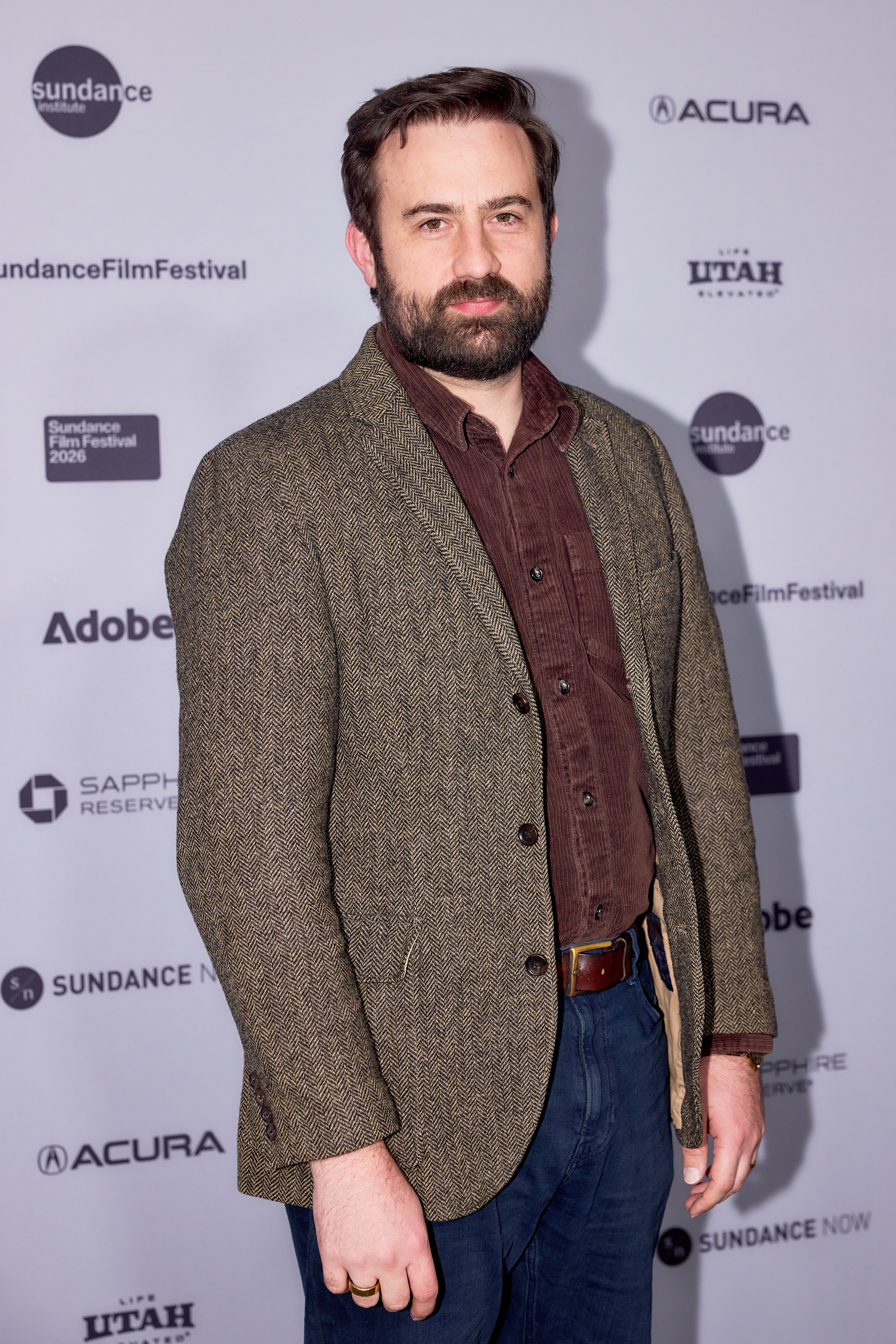
- Born: California, U.S.
- Occupations: Filmmaker, Screenwriter, Playwright
- Years active: 2011–present

Colby Day is an American filmmaker, screenwriter, and playwright. He was listed as one of MovieMaker Magazine's "25 Screenwriters to Watch" in 2024, in collaboration with the Austin Film Festival (AFF), and the film In the Blink of an Eye, which he wrote, was the winner of the Alfred P. Sloan Feature Film Prize at the Sundance Film Festival 2026. His first feature film as a writer/director, The Comedy Hour, was announced in 2025.

== Career ==
Colby Day was born and raised in California. He graduated from the Department of Dramatic Writing at New York University's Tisch School of the Arts in 2010. His plays have been featured by several theater companies, including Crashbox Theatre Company, Pipeline Theatre Company, and The Tank, among others. He directed Appetite in 2012, which was nominated for Best Short Film at the Oldenburg International Film Festival.

Day wrote In the Blink of an Eye, which was featured on The Black List in 2016. The film, directed by Andrew Stanton features actors Rashida Jones, Kate McKinnon, and Daveed Diggs premiered at the Sundance Film Festival in 2026, where it was the winner of the Alfred P. Sloan Feature Film Prize. He also adapted the science fiction novel Children of Time by Adrian Tchaikovsky for Lionsgate. He was hired to develop and write the television pilot Simultaneous for Hulu, based on a short story by Eric Heisserer, with Heisserer and Lawrence Grey producing.

Day wrote the screenplay for the Netflix film Spaceman (2024), directed by Johan Renck, starring Adam Sandler, Carey Mulligan, and Paul Dano, which was an adaptation of the novel Spaceman of Bohemia by Jaroslav Kalfar.

Day served as a producer of the short documentary The School of Canine Massage, directed by Emma D. Miller, which premiered at South by Southwest 2024. He is also a producer on Miller's first feature-length documentary, Father Figures.

== Personal life ==
Day is married to documentary filmmaker Emma D. Miller.

== Filmography ==
=== Film ===
Year	Title	Contribution	Note
2011	I Don't Want to Kill Myself	Writer and executive producer	Feature film
2012	Appetite	Director	Short film
2013	Storefront	Director, writer and producer	Short film
2017	Happy Vacation	Co-director, co-writer and co-producer	Short film
2017	Perks	Co-director, co-writer and producer	Short film
2022	Lead/Follow	Director, writer and producer	Short film
2024	The School of Canine Massage	Producer	Short film
2024	Spaceman	Writer	Feature film
2026	In the Blink of an Eye	Writer, executive producer	Feature film
TBA	Father Figures	Producer	Feature film
TBA	The Comedy Hour	Director, writer	Feature film

=== Theatre ===
- Felix & The Diligence (2011)
- Giant Killer Slugs! (2012)
- The Great Molly (2014)
- Kitchen Sink Experiment(s) (2015)

=== Music videos ===
- "Abstract Bitch" by Sam Corbin (featuring Blanche Dubwha) (2017)
