= Elizabeth Lo =

Hong Kong director

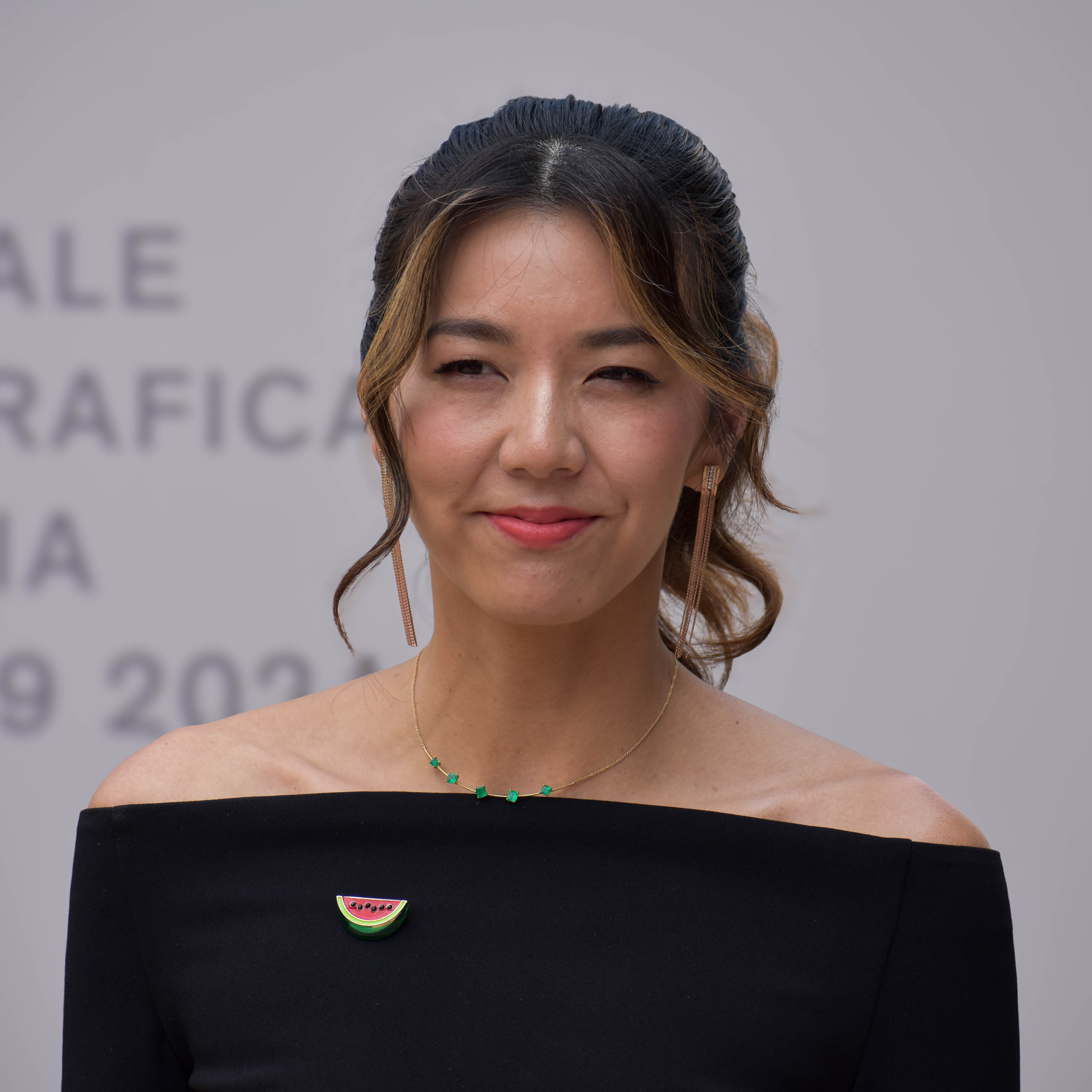
- 2024
- Born: Hong Kong
- Occupations: Director, cinematographer, producer
- Years active: 2014–present

Elizabeth Lo is a Hong Kong film director, producer, and cinematographer. She has directed the documentary features Stray (2020) and Mistress Dispeller (2024).

== Early life ==
Lo was born and raised in Hong Kong. Lo moved to the United States to attend New York University Tisch School of the Arts and Stanford University, where she earned a Bachelor of Fine Arts and a Master of Fine Arts, respectively.

== Career ==
In 2020, Lo, directed, produced, edited, and served as cinematographer on Stray, following the life of a dog living on the streets of Istanbul. It screened at Hot Docs, BFI London Film Festival and DOC NYC. It was released in March 2021, by Magnolia Pictures.

In 2024, Lo, directed, produced, and served as cinematographer on Mistress Dispeller, which follows a woman hiring the titular professional to break up her husband's affair. It had its world premiere at 81st Venice International Film Festival and screened at the 2024 Toronto International Film Festival.
