= Dominique Cabrera =

French film director

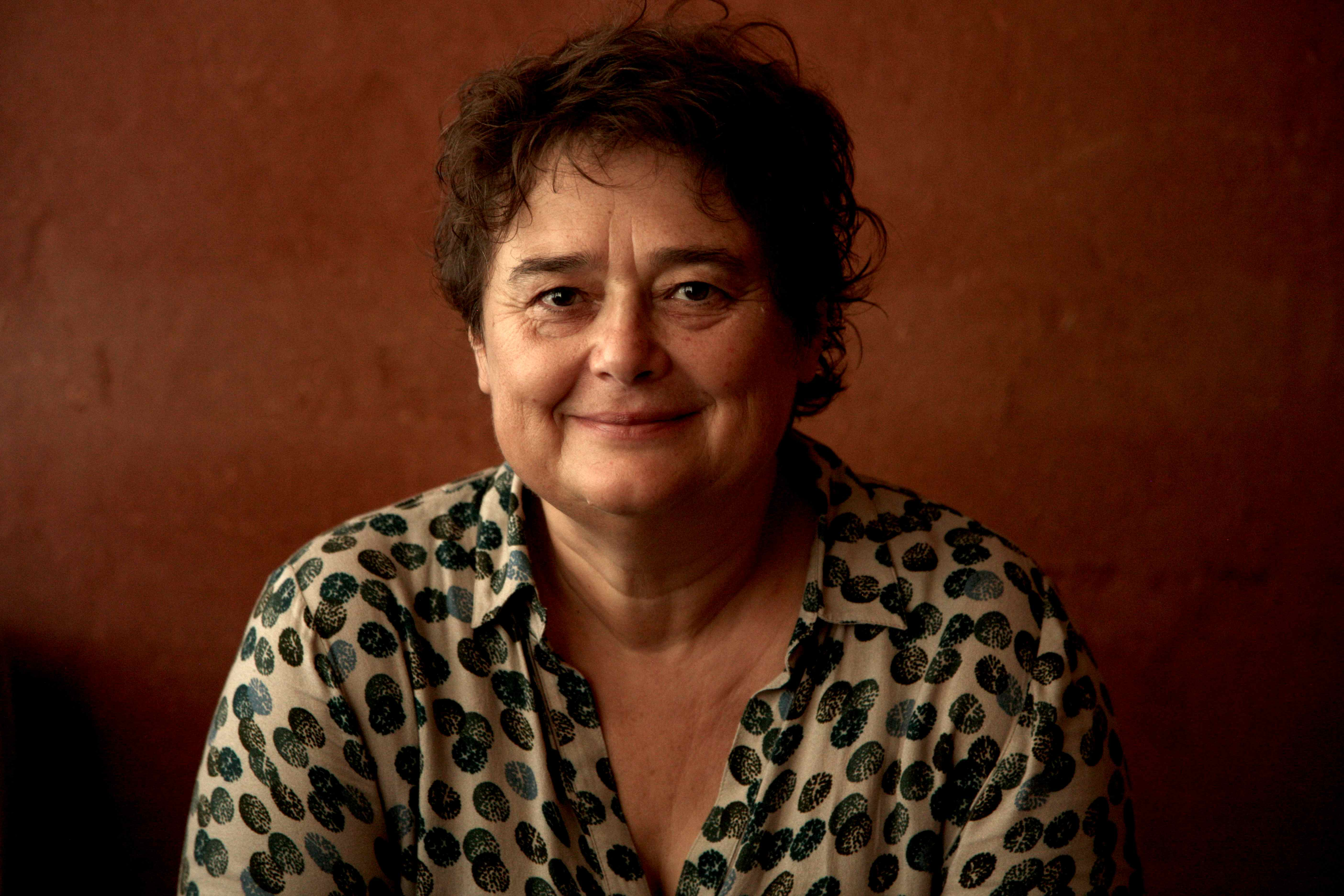
- Born: 21 December 1957 (age 68); Relizane, Algeria
- Occupations: Film director Screenwriter; Film critic Professor
- Years active: 1981–present

Dominique Cabrera (born 21 December 1957) is a French film director. She has taught filmmaking at La Fémis and at Harvard University. Her film Nadia et les hippopotames was screened in the Un Certain Regard section at the 1999 Cannes Film Festival. Additionally, her work has screened in the Berlinale, the Toronto International Film Festival, the Vienna International Film Festival, the Locarno Film Festival, the Rotterdam Film Festival, and in the New York Film Festival, among others.

== Biography ==
Dominique Cabrera was born in 1957 in Relizane, Algeria and moved to France as a child in 1962. In 1981, she graduated from the Paris film school Institut des hautes études cinématographiques (IDHEC), now known as La Fémis.

Between 1982 and 1993, Cabrera directed five short films, documentaries, and works of fiction. Two of her films of the 1990s – Chronique d'une banlieue ordinaire and Une poste à la Courneuve – brought Cabrera early recognition.

After reading one of her scripts at a screenwriting competition in 1990, producer Didier Haudepin recognized Cabrera as an emerging talent. His support led to the production of her first feature film, L'autre côté de la mer, six years later.

== Work ==
Political engagement spans Cabrera's diverse filmography, which includes documentaries, fiction works, and films combining the two genres. According to some critics, Cabrera does not make moral or ideological judgments about her characters or documentary subjects. Rather, she infuses her images with lyricism, love, and a sense of wonder, leaving judgment up to the viewer. Her fiction work deals with issues of family, motherhood, cultural assimilation, and national heritage. Cabrera's own pied-noir origins inform her interest in issues of assimilation and in the history between France and the Maghreb. Themes of utopia, doubt, and discouragement also recur across her work.

Cabrera's first feature-length work of fiction, L'autre côté de la mer, addresses questions of assimilation in contemporary French society. A wealthy French pied-noir travels to Paris for a cataract operation. The doctor who performs his surgery is Algerian-born but has lived in France since childhood. Through intimate depictions of these two characters and interactions with their families, Cabrera articulates enduring consequences of Algeria's 1962 struggle for independence. The film screened at the Cannes Film Festival.

Cabrera made her second feature film, Nadia et les hippopotames, in 1999. Arte broadcast an edited version of the film with the title Retiens la nuit. The film combined documentary elements within a larger fictional framework. Much of the film, which takes place during the SNCF's 1995 general strikes, records actual railroad workers at night and in winter.

Cabrera's filmic diary, Demain et encore demain, Journal 1995 (Tomorrow and Tomorrow Again), which premiered at the Berlinale, was one of the first features shot on video to see a theatrical release in France. The autobiographical film, made in 1995, alternately depicts the anguish and delight of its creator. Exploring the documentary as a therapeutic process, Cabrera inserts herself into the fabric of the film. Each of her various identities – woman, mother, daughter, sister, lover – informs a growing definition of what it means to be a filmmaker. This film represents a turning point in Cabrera's career. Between Demain et encore demain in 1998 and her second autobiographical film Grandir, which screened at ACID Cannes in 2013, all of her feature-length work was fictional.

Folle Embellie in 2004 represents a venture into period fiction; the film is set in June 1940 amid Axis bombing campaigns. Against this backdrop Cabrera evokes a fairy tale about the refuge the natural world offers to the escapees of an asylum. The film features Jean-Pierre Léaud and is based on a story Cabrera heard when she worked in a psychiatric hospital in the 1970s.

Le Lait de la Tendresse Humaine is Cabrera's film that most explicitly addresses issues of motherhood. Marilyne Canto plays a victim of postpartum depression, who leaves her family without notice and hides in a neighbor's apartment. Critics praised the film for its use of color, its compassion for its characters, and its frank portrayal of a mother's struggle.

Quand la ville mord was Cabrera's first literary adaptation; its plot comes from a novel by Marc Villard which was part of the "Série Noire" crime fiction collection. Cabrera produced the film for the television station, France 2. The film was praised for its realistic depiction of a young African woman's forced sex work, for which Cabrera and the film's lead, Aïssa Maïga, met with former sex workers in Paris.

Certain actors, such as Marilyne Canto, Yolande Moreau, Olivier Gourmet, and Ariane Ascaride, each appear in more than one of Cabrera's films. Sometimes she works with more famous actors, such as Patrick Bruel and Miou-Miou. Cabrera suggests that these actors' inclusion in her work subliminally recalls roles they played in previous films . She has consistently worked with the same crew since the 1980s, including her director of photography, Hélène Louvart.

Cabrera has also acted in three films: Un petit cas de conscience by Marie Claude Treilhou, Douches froides by Antony Cordier, and Belleville-Tokyo by Elise Girard.

Her films have received significant critical acclaim, a César nomination, and two nominations at the Cannes Film Festival.

== Filmography ==
=== Features ===
- Chronique d'une banlieue ordinaire (1992)
- Rester là-bas (1992)
- Une poste à la Courneuve (1994)
- L'autre côté de la mer (1997)
- Demain et encore demain, journal 1995 (1997)
- Nadia et les hippopotames (2000)
- The Milk of Human Kindness (2001)
- Folle embellie (2004)
- Quand la ville mord (2009)
- Grandir (2013)
- Ça ne peut pas continuer comme ça (2013)
- Corniche Kennedy (2016)

=== Shorts ===
- J'ai droit à la parole (1981)
- À trois pas, trésor caché (1984)
- L'art d'aimer (1985)
- La politique du pire (1987)
- Ici là bas (1988), short
- Un balcon au Val Fourré (1990)
- Traverser le jardin (1993)
- Rêves de ville (1993)
- Ranger les photos (2009)
- Goat Milk (2013)
