= Gracija Filipović =

Croatian actress (born 2002)

- Born: October 25, 2002 (age 23); Croatia
- Occupation: Actor
- Works: Murina, Into the Blue

Gracija Filipović is a Croatian film actress. She is known for her starring role in Murina as well her collaborations with director Antoneta Alamat Kusijanović.

In 2022, she won the Gotham Award for Break Through Performer for her role in Murina.

She grew up in Dubrovnik and began acting as a child in theatre. She is also a former professional swimmer.

== Awards ==
- 2022 Gotham Independent Film Award for Break Through Performer

== Films ==
- The Little Raccoon (2013), short
- Into the Blue [U plavetnilo] (2017), short
- Murina (2022)
