= Liam (2018 film) =

- Film poster
- Directed by: Isidore Bethel
- Produced by: Isidore Bethel; Anne-Laure Berteau
- Edited by: Sandie Bompar
- Music by: Ben Cosgrove
- Production companies: Alice Films; Because the night productions
- Distributed by: Tënk
- Release date: April 7, 2018 (Boston LGBT Film Festival)
- Running time: 70 minutes
- Countries: United States; France
- Languages: English; French

Liam is a 2018 first-person documentary film directed by Isidore Bethel. It follows the director's own story as he moves to France after his best friend Liam dies back in the United States. Through documentary, performance, and stop motion animation, a ghostly portrait emerges of Liam, prompting Isidore to question his relationships with his parents and his boyfriend in Paris. The film premiered at the Boston LGBT Film Festival and received the Paris LGBTQ+ Film Festival's Documentary Jury Prize in 2018. The francophone streaming service Tënk acquired the film in 2019 for streaming.

The film met a modest but favorable reception: critics noted that "Bethel is most definitely a very talented cinematic voice" and characterized the film as "brilliant" and as a "documentary that's universal for how it questions grief and powerful for its analysis of the legacies that survivors bear."
