= Peter Kujawski =

American film studio executive

- Born: Philadelphia, Pennsylvania, U.S.
- Education: Columbia University (BA)
- Occupation: Film executive
- Known for: Chairman of Focus Features

Peter Kujawski is an American film studio executive who is the Chairman of Focus Features.

== Biography ==
Kujawski is a native of Philadelphia who graduated from Columbia University in 2000. At Columbia, he studied with Award-winning filmmaker James Schamus, who hired him as his assistant at Good Machine.

After the studio was absorbed into Focus Features, Kujawski worked on Focus’ sales team, where he sold international movie rights of movies such as Eternal Sunshine of the Spotless Mind and Lost in Translation. He was Manager of Creative Affairs and in 2010, was named Vice President of International Sales for Focus Features.

In 2011, Kujawski joined Universal Pictures, where he served as EVP of Worldwide Acquisitions until 2014. He also oversaw acquisitions for Focus in that capacity. He helped acquire international rights for films such as The Wolf of Wall Street and Zero Dark Thirty.

In 2014, Kujawski was named Managing Director of Universal Pictures International Productions, which merged with Focus two years later. He was promoted to Chairman of Focus Features in 2016. Under his leadership, the studio has been the number one specialty studio in market share. During the COVID-19 pandemic, he led a successful push for premium video on demand that made up for the company's losses in box office revenues.

== Personal life and family ==
Kujawski is married to Enough Said producer Stefanie Azpiazu, and the couple lives in Toluca Lake, Los Angeles, with their two daughters. He was dubbed "Kujo" by his colleagues.
