= Murina (film) =

- Directed by: Antoneta Alamat Kusijanović
- Written by: Antoneta Alamat Kusijanović; Frank Graziano
- Produced by: Rodrigo Teixeira; Danijel Pak
- Starring: Gracija Filipović; Leon Lučev; Danica Curcic; Cliff Curtis
- Cinematography: Hélène Louvart
- Edited by: Vladimir Gojun
- Music by: Evgueni Galperine
- Production companies: Sikelia Productions; RT Features; Antitalent; Spiritus Movens; Spok; Stargara; Croatian Audiovisual Centre; Slovenian Film Centre; Viba Film; Hrvatska radiotelevizija; Radiotelevizija Slovenija
- Distributed by: Kino Lorber (United States)
- Release dates: July 10, 2021 (Cannes); July 8, 2022 (United States)
- Running time: 92 minutes
- Countries: United States; Brazil; Croatia; Slovenia
- Box office: $408,213

Murina (Croatian for 'moray eel') is a 2021 internationally co-produced drama film, directed by Antoneta Alamat Kusijanović, in her feature directorial debut, from a screenplay by Kusijanović and Frank Graziano. It stars Gracija Filipović, Leon Lučev, Danica Curcic, and Cliff Curtis. Martin Scorsese served as an executive producer under his Sikelia Productions banner.

It premiered at the 2021 Cannes Film Festival, where it won the Caméra d'Or. It was released in the United States on July 8, 2022, by Kino Lorber.

== Plot ==
Julija and her parents, Ante and Nela, live on a remote island along Croatia's Adriatic coast. The film spans a weekend in the family's life, during which Ante invites an old friend, Javier, to their home and attempts to convince Javier to purchase their land and develop a deluxe resort on it. The weekend quickly goes south when old resentments and familial tensions flare up.

Julija, a quiet but independent and headstrong teenager, watches her parents undertake preparations for Javier's visit with an air of disinterest, only participating when asked. She is an avid swimmer and spearfisher, who oftens goes around wearing only a one-piece swimsuit, and throughout the weekend often retreats to the sea.

After watching Javier and Nela flirt during a seaside excursion, Julija learns that her mother and Javier had a romantic relationship in the past, and that Javier at one time intended to marry Nela. She presses Nela to pursue a renewed connection with Javier so that the two of them can leave Ante, who domineers over the family—but Nela refuses, saying that "as soon as he boards the plane," Javier will forget about them.

The tension between the four comes to a head at a party for Javier the night before he's meant to leave. Ante instructs Julija not to attend or to cause problems, and after several acts of defiance by Julija, he locks her in a closed-off section of the family home. Julija escapes by using a hatch in the floor to cave dive in the depths below with a flashlight, and swimming to the site of the party. There, she and Ante clash, and Ante confronts and strikes Javier.

After the party, Javier leaves the island the next morning without closing the real estate deal. Ante and Julija prepare to go spearfishing, something they did together often before the events of the weekend. As Julija swims behind her father, she aims the speargun at him. She fires but misses intentionally. Julija and her father surface and look at each other before Julija swims away.

== Cast ==
- Gracija Filipović as Julija
- Leon Lučev as Ante
- Danica Curcic as Nela
- Cliff Curtis as Javier

== Production ==
In May 2018, Antoneta Alamat Kusijanović was announced as the director, drawing from a screenplay she wrote alongside Frank Graziano. Martin Scorsese executive produced the film under his Sikelia Productions banner.

Principal photography, led by director of photography Hélène Louvart, took place in Croatia in late 2019. Louvart was new to filming underwater, and spent significant time scouting locations while consulting with the camera operator Zoran Mikincic who is an underwater filming specialist. LED lights were used to set the color of underwater scenes, with black fabric used to control ambient sunlight. Some scenes were shot in studio or in a pool for safety reasons.

== Release ==
The film had its world premiere at the Cannes Film Festival in the Directors' Fortnight section on July 10, 2021. It won the Caméra d'Or award for best first feature. In February 2022, Kino Lorber acquired distribution rights to the film. It was released in the United States on July 8, 2022.

== Reception ==
On Rotten Tomatoes the film has a 91% rating based on 76 reviews. On Metacritic it has a score of 76 out of 100 based on 20 reviews, indicating "generally favorable reviews".

Manohla Dargis of The New York Times described the film as "a visually striking if overly diffuse take of an unruly daughter." Sheri Linden of The Hollywood Reporter said that the film was "a notable debut for a gifted director." Glenn Kenny of RogerEbert.com gave the film three and a half out of four stars, writing that it was "one of the more coherent and satisfying narrative releases of the year."
