= Antoneta Alamat Kusijanović =

Croatian film director and writer

- Born: September 27, 1985 (age 40); Dubrovnik, SR Croatia, Yugoslavia
- Occupations: Director; Writer
- Works: Murina, Into the Blue
- Children: 1

Antoneta Alamat Kusijanović (born 27 September 1985) is a Croatian film director and writer. She has won awards at the Berlin International Film Festival, Cannes Film Festival and Sarajevo Film Festival.

Her first feature film Murina premiered at the 2021 Cannes Film Festival and won the Caméra d'Or for best first feature film.

== Early life and education ==
Kusijanović grew up in Dubrovnik and studied film, theater, and producing at the Academy of Dramatic Arts in Zagreb. She continued her education at Columbia University and received an MFA in screenwriting and directing. She was a child actor in Croatia, starting at the age of six and in middle school was a foreign exchange student in Canada.

== Career ==
Kusijanović began making short films and music videos in the early 2010s. She moved to New York, attended Columbia University and shot her short film and graduate thesis, Into the Blue (U plavetnilo).

Into the Blue (U plavetnilo) was released to much acclaim, winning awards at the Sarajevo Film Festival, Cannes Film Festival, the Berlin Film Festival and it was nominated for a student Academy Award. Its success led to Martin Scorsese coming on board as an executive producer for her first feature film Murina.

Kusijanovic expanded on the themes of Into the Blue, including adolescence and gender, in Murina, rehiring the same lead actor, Gracija Filipović. Kusijanovic wrote the role in Murina specifically for Filipoviç and has known her since Filipoviç was nine, saying "... the relationship was more mothering back then and over the years it grew into friendship and then real collaboration."

Kusijanovic's latest project is a short film, Stane, commissioned by Miu Miu for the company's Women’s Tales series. It stars Murina actress Danica Curcic.

== Personal life ==
Kusijanović is married, and has a son who she gave birth to shortly before winning the Caméra d'Or in 2021.

== Awards ==
- 2021 Winner - Cannes Film Festival - Caméra d'or (Golden Camera)
- 2017 Winner - Sarajevo Film Festival - Heart of Sarajevo - Best Short Film (director)
- 2017 Winner - Berlin Film Festival - Special Mention of the Generation 14 plus International Jury - Best Short Film

== Nominations ==
Her student film Into the Blue was nominated for a student Oscar in 2017.

She was nominated for Outstanding Directorial Achievement of a First-time Feature Film Director by the Directors Guild of America for her film Murina.

== Filmography ==
=== Directed ===
- 2014: Nonina
- 2014: Jelka (Christmas tree), short film
- 2015: Oko za Oko (Eye for an Eye), short film
- 2016: If We Must Die, short film
- 2017: Into the Blue (U plavetnilo), short film
- 2021: Murina, feature film
- 2023: Stane, short film
