= Spaceman of Bohemia =

2017 novel by Jaroslav Kalfař

- First edition
- Author: Jaroslav Kalfař
- Language: English
- Genre: Science fiction, Absurdist fiction
- Set in: Bohemia
- Published: March 7, 2017
- Publisher: Little, Brown and Co.
- Publication place: Czech Republic
- Pages: 288
- ISBN: 9780316273404

Spaceman of Bohemia is a science fiction novel written by Jaroslav Kalfař in 2017.

== Premise ==
The narrative is told from the point of view of Jakub Procházka, the first independent Czech cosmonaut. He is sent on an eight-month solo mission in space to a cloud of "intergalactic dust" near Venus that no other country is willing to risk sending their citizens to inspect. He meets and befriends a giant arachnid named Hanuš. Jakub's motivation for space travel is rooted in a desire to escape his past.

== Background ==
Jaroslav Kalfař (Czech: [jaˈroˈslav kal̩ˈfar̝̊]) was born on May 20, 1988, in Prague, Bohemia, one year before the Velvet Revolution, and moved to the United States in 2003 at the age of fifteen. He spoke very little English at the time, and learned by watching Cartoon Network. He graduated from the University of Central Florida and then went on to earn an MFA from New York University. He was the recipient of the 2018 National Endowment for the Arts Literature Fellowship, which granted him $25,000 in order for him to write, research, and travel.

Kalfař describes how Jakub's grandfather in the book resembles his own grandfather, to whom the book is dedicated. Kalfař says that as he was writing the book, he kept thinking about a significant event in his early childhood. When he was about 5 or 6 years old, he was taking a walk in the woods late at night with his grandfather and for two minutes, his grandfather lost track of him. He remembers "this perfect darkness, with nothing but the stars" above him, with "this perfect silence and just this complete loneliness. That feeling has stayed" with him throughout his life. He has used that experience to relate to Jakub and write his story.

As for Kalfař's history with literature, in an interview with Writer's Bone, Kalfař shares how he caught the storytelling "bug" early in his life. "My father had an extensive collection of horror and sci-fi videotapes, and those were the gateway to books. I was in awe of how much stories could move and shape a person," Kalfař says. This led him to try writing X-Files fan fiction, which eventually led him to write his own original narratives. As for reading, Kalfař's experience with X-Files fan fiction led him "to exploring the small library of [his] grandparents—Robinson Crusoe, any Jules Verne [he] could find. Those were the early days." After that, he discovered Tolkien, Pratchett, and Le Guin in middle school, and eventually began reading more advanced works, such as those of Kundera, Dostoevsky, and Dickens. Kalfař's writing process does not include outlining, but, instead, sitting in silence and allowing himself to "hear the characters in [his] head shout over each other." Specifically, his inspiration for Spaceman of Bohemia came from his fascination "with loneliness, its contradictions, how people experience it so differently. It seemed like there was no greater place to study loneliness than within the confines of space." However, he wanted to incorporate some politics into his debut novel. Naturally, an astronaut included both.

In another interview, Kalfař describes how Spaceman of Bohemia began as a short story. "I started writing it right before I came to New York. It was about an American spaceman, astronaut, stranded in orbit while his wife filed for divorce. Short, funny story. While I was in Jonathan Foer's class, he asked me why I wasn't writing about the Czech Republic. I said I wanted to. That's what I wanted to do most. And he said, 'Well, the astronaut should be Czech.' That was when it all clicked." Originally, the main character was an American, with all the stereotypical attributes. Once he applied a different nationality, closer to his own heart, it added "depth" to the story, as the astronaut had "real issues." Once this change was made, the story lengthened; "It was because I changed him to something that was close to me and that I really wanted to write about a lot".

== Plot ==
Jakub Procházka is a Czech astrophysicist who agrees to an eight-month mission of exploring a cloud of space dust called Chopra that was created by a comet. Jakub must travel to its location (between Earth and Venus) to collect samples of the cloud so that scientists could determine what it is, why it is making the sky purple at night, and why it is beginning to consume itself. The mission is deemed too dangerous by most countries to attempt, so the Czech Republic decides to take the opportunity to be the first. It's decided that Jakub will be sent on the mission, making him a celebrity in the public eye. He is not very passionate about becoming an astronaut, however, instead wanting to redeem his family name. His father was a member of the Communist Party of Czechoslovakia during the totalitarian rule, and a young Jakub and his grandparents were harshly punished by their community for the now deceased father's actions after a stranger revealed his secrets. Jakub feels his family name can only be redeemed by his becoming a national hero.

Jakub leaves his wife, Lenka, on Earth while he goes on this eight-month mission. He continues to talk to her every day over video-call, along with his mission engineer Petr. The stress of the situation coupled with a feeling of abandonment becomes too much for Lenka, and she leaves Jakub. This adds to Jakub's feeling of extreme loneliness, making his mission almost unbearable. He begins to drink extensively and becomes depressed, and he starts to question his mental state when he hears voices. After he starts seeing a giant, talking spider walking around the space shuttle, Jakub thinks it is his imagination or a mental breakdown, but he becomes less sure of this as he continues to see the spider. The spider, which Jakub decides to call Hanuš, reveals that he is an alien from another planet and was sent to research humans and their way of life.

Jakub passes his time with Hanuš while getting reports back from the spy he hired to follow Lenka. When he finally reaches Chopra, the dust particles tear open his ship and he decides to spend his last moments with a dying Hanuš, whom he has grown very close to. At the last moment, Jakub is rescued by a Russian shuttle, where he meets three other cosmonauts. They explain that they are from a secret Russian program and that once they land he will be imprisoned. As they are landing, Jakub escapes with the help of one of the cosmonauts who claims to have met Hanuš as well. The escape attempt causes the ship to crash, with Jakub as the only survivor. He learns he was pronounced dead to the world and decides this is better for both him and Lenka, who he believes is happier without him. He travels back to his childhood home, where he decides to live the rest of his life.

== Characters ==
Jakub Procházka (Czech: [jaˈkub pr̩oˈxaːˈzka]) - The protagonist and narrator of the story. We follow him on his journey to space and back, as well as his memories of his youth.

Lenka (Czech: [lɛŋka]) - Jakub's wife. She leaves him due to the emotional stress and the strain on their relationship created by him going to space.

Hanuš (Czech: [ɦaˈnuʃ]) - A spider-like alien who visits Jakub while he is in space. He uses telepathy to peek into Jakub's memories. As the story progresses, Hanuš creates a close bond to Jakub.

Jakub's father - A member of the Communist Party, who was secretly working for the StB (communist secret police agency) as an interrogator. His position would lead to the ostracization and bullying of Jakub and his grandparents.

Jakub's grandfather - A farmer. He is a blunt man, but as his home life is threatened by the "Shoe Man" he becomes more verbally aggressive. His family is able to keep it from becoming physical.

Jakub's grandmother - She seems to be kinder than her husband when it comes to Jakub.

Petr (Czech: [pɛtr̩]) - Jakub's mission engineer. Other than Hanuš, he seems to be Jakub's closest thing to a friend while he is in space. He is used in the story as Jakub's only link to Lenka, as he feeds him the information after she leaves and helps him find her once he is back on Earth.

Dr. Kuřák (Czech: [kuˈr̝aːk]) - Jakub's psychiatrist. He seems to have a strong interest in Freud's theories. Jakub has a great dislike for him.

"Shoe Man" - A vengeful plutocrat who was tortured and imprisoned in his youth by Jakub's father. He feels Jakub's family owes him for his youth being ruined. He also takes an interest in Jakub, keeping an eye on him as he matures.

Klara - One of the Russian phantom cosmonauts sent on a secret mission to investigate Chopra. She is the kindest to Jakub, leading to him developing an attraction towards her.

Vasily - One of the Russian phantom cosmonauts sent on a secret mission to investigate Chopra. He is the only character other than Jakub to meet Hanuš. He, however, believes the alien to be a god and is driven insane.

Yuraj - One of the Russian phantom cosmonauts sent on a secret mission to investigate Chopra. He seems to have more of a sadistic streak.

== Reception ==
Jason Heller, a writer for NPR, and Hari Kunzru, a writer for The New York Times, both praise Kalfař's novel for turning the sci-fi genre on its head. Kunzru states that Spaceman of Bohemia does not get hung up explaining some of the more technical aspects of the sci-fi genre; rather the "extravagant conceptual furniture" that the novel's story sets up "are merely metaphors for the human-scale issues that are its real concerns". Kunzru continues, saying of the book, "That’s not to say Kalfař hasn’t done his research. There are lovingly detailed passages on the mechanics of going to the toilet and cleaning your teeth in orbit, the dangers of muscle wastage and other minutiae of life in zero gravity, but all the whizzy space business is harnessed to the basic question of what it means to leave and whether it’s possible to come back." Tibor Fischer in The Guardian writes, "'Spaceman of Bohemia' should win many fans. It’s 'Solaris' with laughs, history lessons and a pig killing."

== Film adaptation ==
In 2020, Netflix announced that the novel would be adapted into a feature film titled Spaceman, directed by Johan Renck, with a screenplay by Colby Day and starring Adam Sandler and Carey Mulligan. In June 2021, filming began in Prague, Czech Republic. Spaceman premiered at the 74th Berlin International Film Festival on February 21, 2024, and received a limited theatrical release on February 23, 2024 before its streaming debut by Netflix on March 1, 2024.
