= Balls Out (2014 film) =

2014 American comedy film

- Theatrical release poster
- Directed by: Andrew Disney
- Written by: Bradley Jackson
- Produced by: Russell Wayne Groves; Andrew Lee; David Ward; Red Sanders; Tucker Moore; Bradley Jackson
- Starring: Jake Lacy; Beck Bennett; Jay Pharoah; Nikki Reed; Kate McKinnon; DC Pierson; Nick Kocher; Brian McElhaney; Nick Rutherford; Gabriel Luna
- Cinematography: Jeffrey Waldron
- Edited by: Kody Gibson
- Music by: Alice Wood
- Production companies: Ralph Smyth Entertainment; Red Productions
- Distributed by: Orion Pictures
- Release dates: April 19, 2014 (Tribeca); June 19, 2015 (United States)
- Running time: 97 minutes
- Country: United States
- Language: English

Balls Out is a 2014 American sports comedy film directed by Andrew Disney, based on a script by Bradley Jackson. The film stars Jake Lacy, Beck Bennett, Jay Pharoah, Nikki Reed, Kate McKinnon, DC Pierson, Nick Kocher, Brian McElhaney, Nick Rutherford and Gabriel Luna, and focuses on a group of college seniors that decide to form an intramural football team before graduating.

The film, originally titled Intramural, stars cast members of comedy groups Saturday Night Live, Derrick Comedy, BriTANicK, and Good Neighbor. The film was picked up by Metro-Goldwyn-Mayer Pictures and Orion Pictures and was given a limited release on film and video on demand on June 19, 2015.

== Synopsis ==
Caleb (Jake Lacy) is a fifth-year senior preparing to graduate. Not quite ready to settle into the life, expectations, and realities outside of his college, he decides that he wants to reassemble The Panthers, an intramural football team that had to shut down after one of the team members ended up getting partially paralyzed for life. Doing so is going to be far more difficult than he expected.

== Cast ==
- Jake Lacy as Caleb Fuller
- Nikki Reed as Meredith Downs
- Kate McKinnon as Vicky Albrecht
- Beck Bennett as Dick Downs
- Nick Kocher as Grant Rosenfalis
- Brian McElhaney as Chance Gilman
- Gabriel Luna as Vinnie
- Will Elliott as George Irwin
- Kirk C. Johnson as "Ace"
- Sam Eidson as Jimmy Harris
- Nick Rutherford as Hank
- Jay Pharoah as Dan Albert
- DC Pierson as Bill Costas
- Michael Hogan as Mr. Albrecht
- Clint Howard as Philip Bronson
- John Merriman as Fireman
- Mike MacRae as Doctor

== Production ==
The film's script was written by Bradley Jackson during his sophomore year at the University of Texas, where he was inspired to create the script after listening to his friends brag about their intramural sports games. Jackson expressed his desire to have Andrew Disney direct the film, as he greatly enjoyed his work. Nikki Reed was later confirmed to be performing in the film, as were Beck Bennett and Michael Hogan. Jackson and Disney raised funds for the film through a successful Kickstarter campaign, and filming began on July 12, 2013, in Austin, Texas and continued for six weeks, ending on August 22, 2013.

== Release ==
The film had its world premiere at the Tribeca Film Festival on April 19, 2014. The film went on to screen at the Montclair Film Festival on May 4, 2014. and the Seattle International Film Festival on June 6, 2014. The film was picked up by Metro-Goldwyn-Mayer and Orion Pictures and was retitled Balls Out. The film was released in a limited release and video on demand on June 19, 2015.

== Reception ==
The film was met with positive reviews from film critics. It currently holds an 80% approval rating on Rotten Tomatoes, based on 15 reviews. Andy Webster of The New York Times praised the film for its self-aware humor and talented cast for having comedic timing, singling out Kate McKinnon as a standout, concluding that "she displays talent too vast for the small screen. Now watch her career rocket." Nick Prigge of Slant Magazine gave a mixed review of the film, saying that it was at odds with itself of being either a straight sports film or a satire of the genre. Kyle Anderson of Entertainment Weekly said that while there's some funny commentary on the absurdity of sports films he found the film less a feature film and more a long television sketch.

It won both the Cinema Dulce Best of Fest and Best Actor (Jake Lacy) awards at the Hill Country Film Festival and the Best Guilty Pleasure Audience Award at the Seattle International Film Festival. It also won the Best Sport Comedy award in The Vancouver Sun's 2015 Sports Market Movie Awards.

== See also ==
- List of American football films
- Searching for Sonny, the 2011 film directorial debut of Andrew Disney
