= 27th Independent Spirit Awards =

US film awards ceremony in 2012

- Awarded for: Best in independent film
- Date: February 25, 2012
- Site: Santa Monica Pier; Santa Monica, California, U.S.
- Hosted by: Seth Rogen

Highlights
- Best Feature: The Artist
- Most awards: The Artist (4)
- Most nominations: The Artist (5)

Television coverage
- Channel: IFC

The 27th Independent Spirit Awards, honoring the best independent films of 2011, were presented on February 25, 2012. The nominations were announced on November 29, 2011. The ceremony was hosted by Seth Rogen and aired exclusively on IFC. Highlights included John Waters as the "Voice of God", and musical performances by My Morning Jacket and K'naan.

== Winners and nominees ==
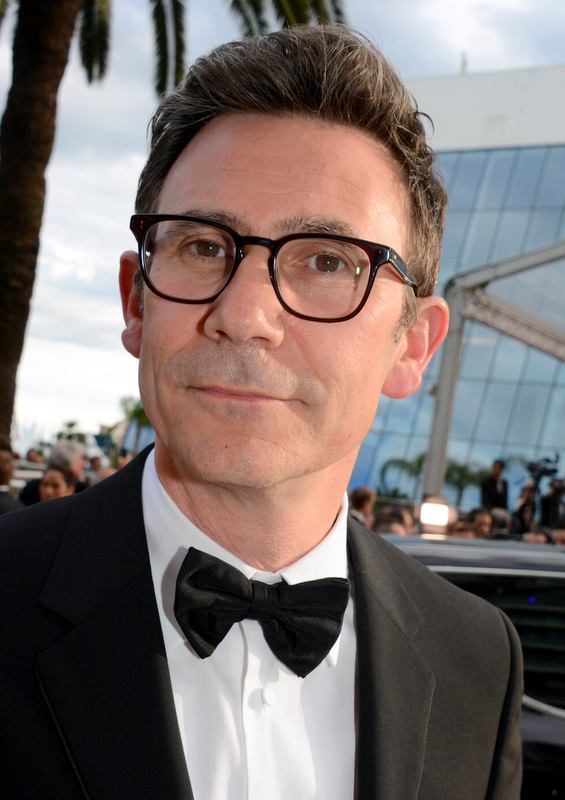
Michel Hazanavicius, Best Director winner

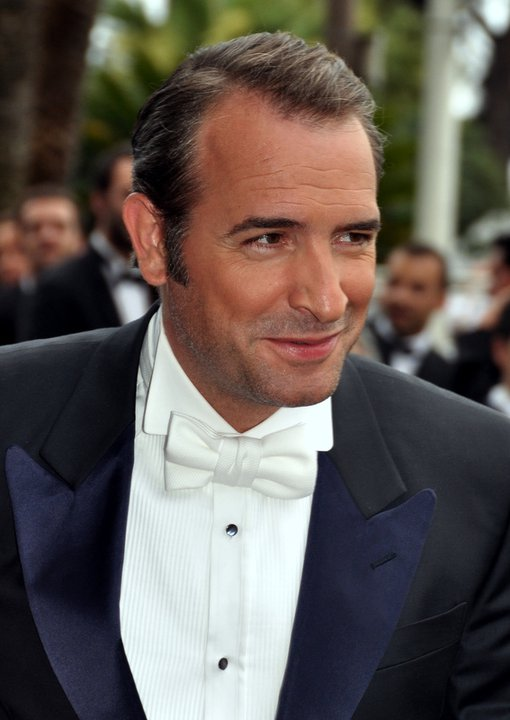
Jean Dujardin, Best Male Lead winner

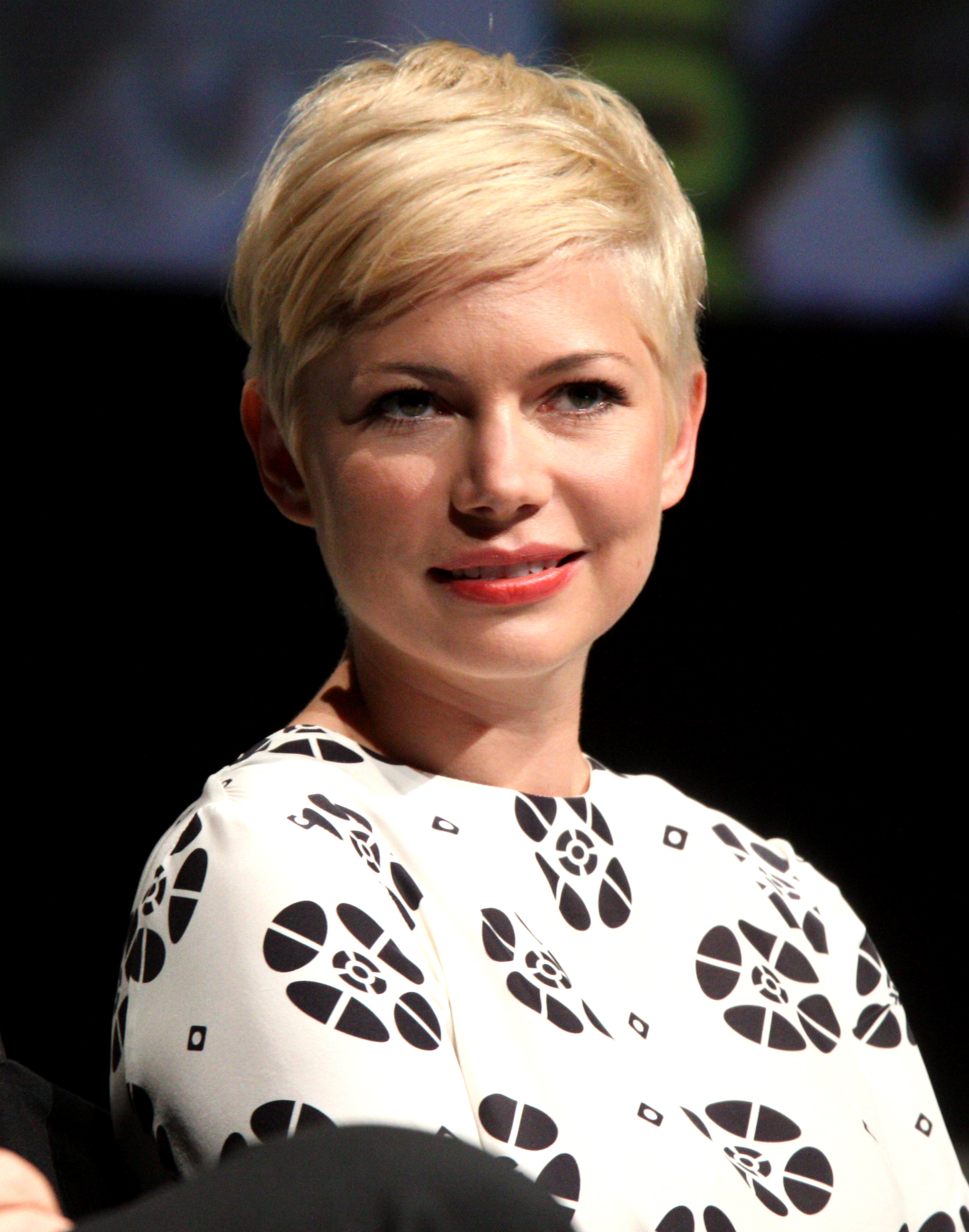
Michelle Williams, Best Female Lead winner

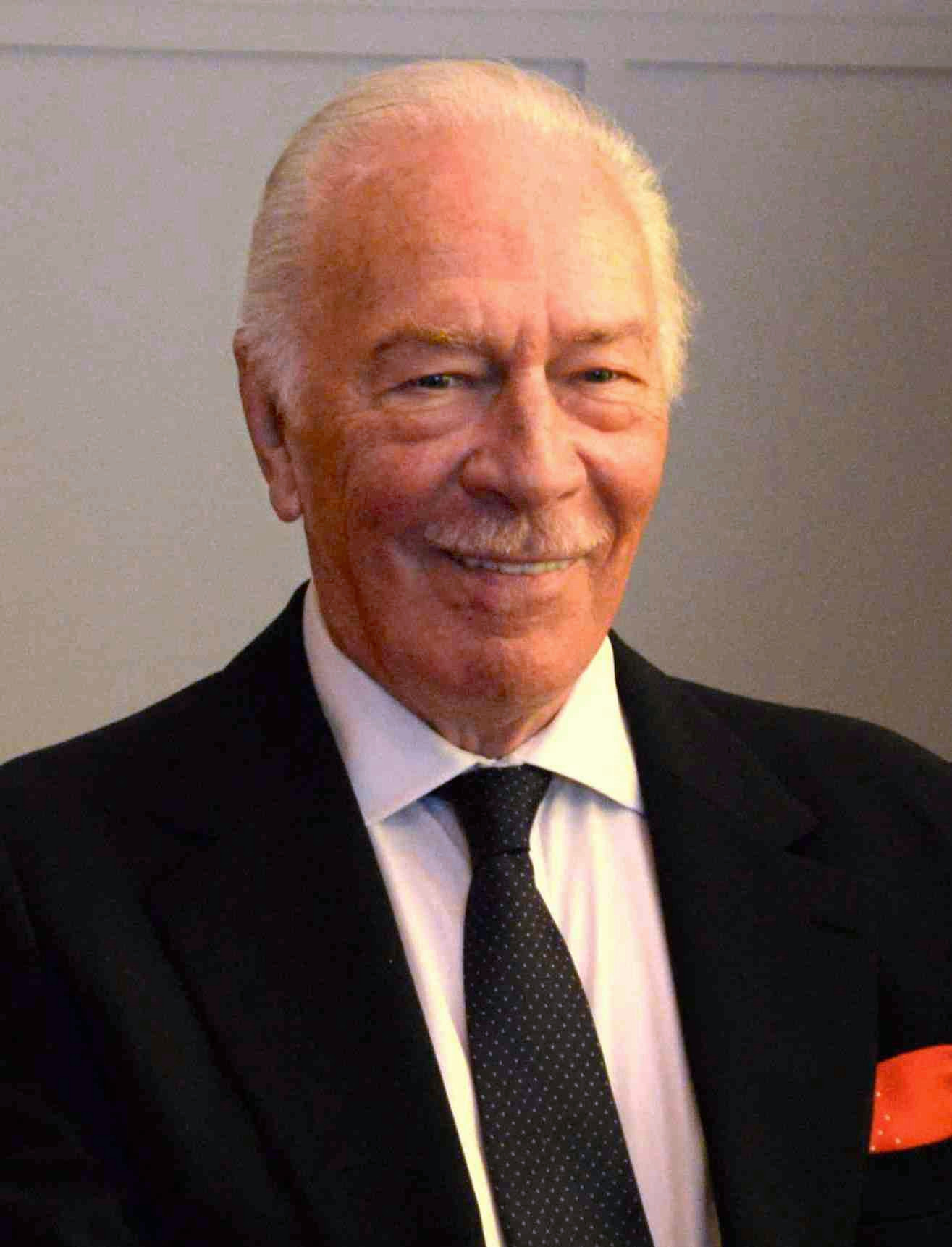
Christopher Plummer, Best Supporting Male winner

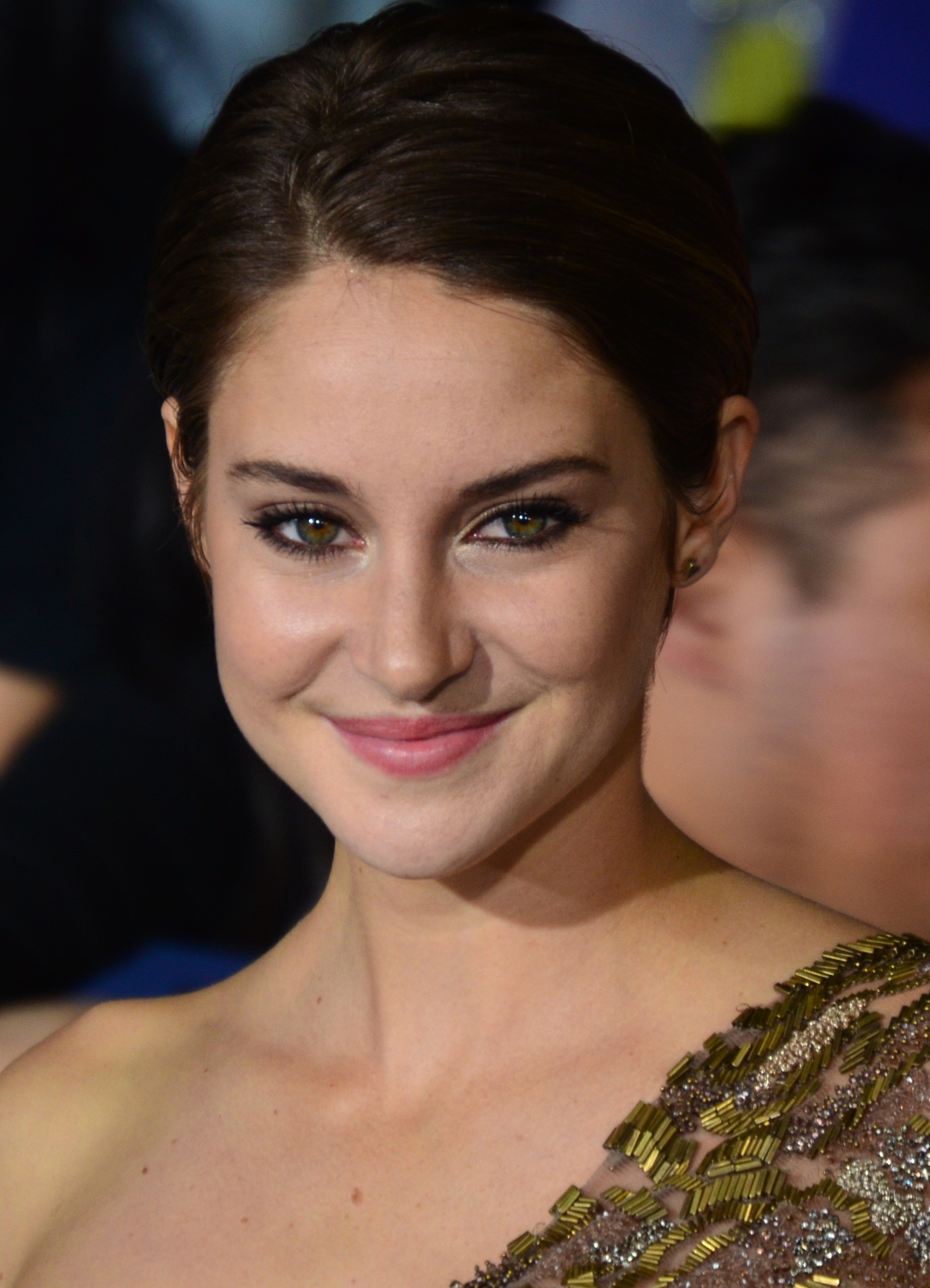
Shailene Woodley, Best Supporting Female winner

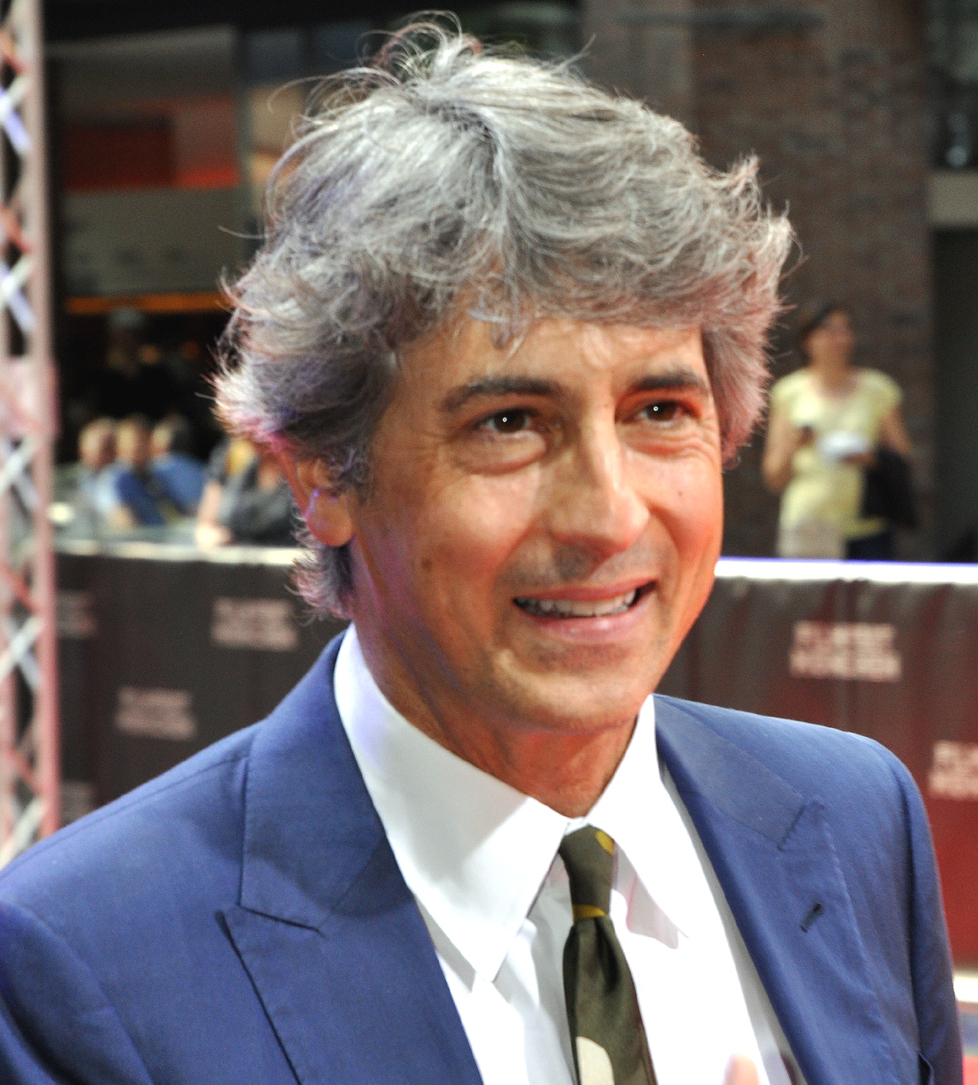
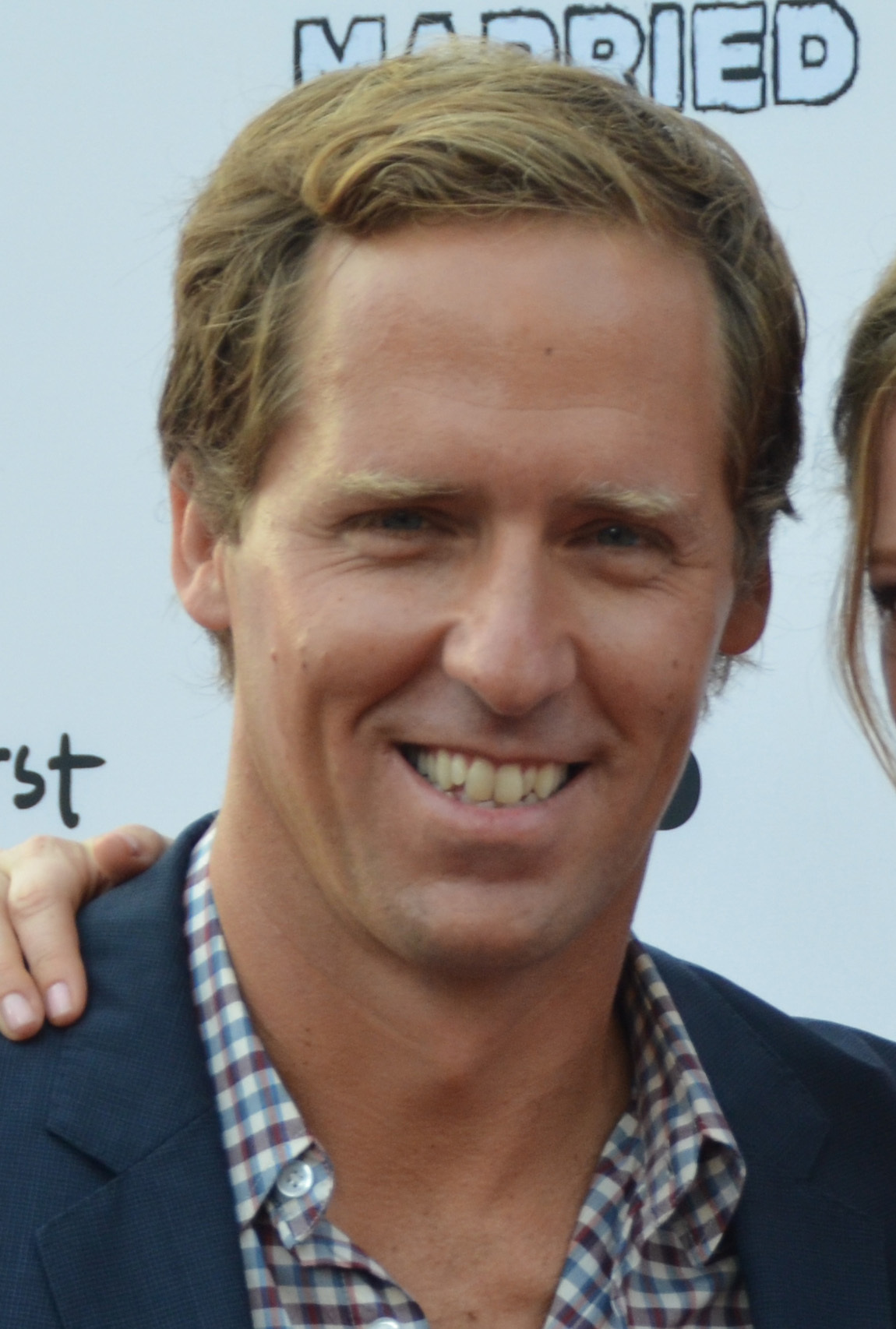
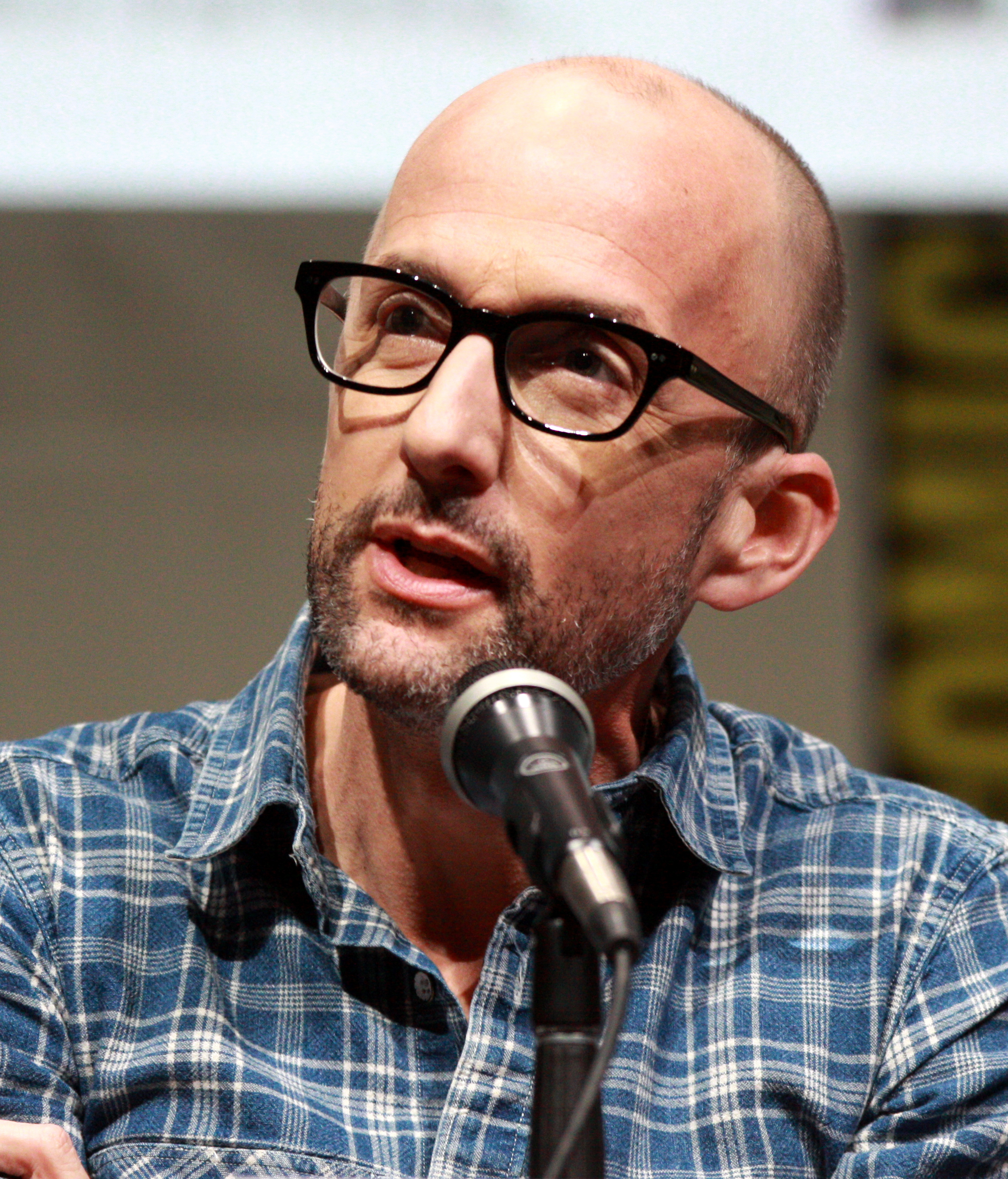
Alexander Payne, Nat Faxon and Jim Rash, Best Screenplay winners

Best Feature	Best Director
The Artist: 50/50; Beginners; The Descendants; Drive; Take Shelter	Michel Hazanavicius – The Artist: Mike Mills – Beginners; Jeff Nichols – Take Shelter; Alexander Payne – The Descendants; Nicolas Winding Refn – Drive
Best Male Lead	Best Female Lead
Jean Dujardin – The Artist: Demián Bichir – A Better Life; Ryan Gosling – Drive; Woody Harrelson – Rampart; Michael Shannon – Take Shelter	Michelle Williams – My Week with Marilyn: Lauren Ambrose – About Sunny; Rachael Harris – Natural Selection; Adepero Oduye – Pariah; Elizabeth Olsen – Martha Marcy May Marlene
Best Supporting Male	Best Supporting Female
Christopher Plummer – Beginners: Albert Brooks – Drive; John Hawkes – Martha Marcy May Marlene; John C. Reilly – Cedar Rapids; Corey Stoll – Midnight in Paris	Shailene Woodley – The Descendants: Jessica Chastain – Take Shelter; Anjelica Huston – 50/50; Janet McTeer – Albert Nobbs; Harmony Santana – Gun Hill Road
Best Screenplay	Best First Screenplay
Alexander Payne, Nat Faxon, and Jim Rash – The Descendants: Joseph Cedar – Footnote; Michel Hazanavicius – The Artist; Tom McCarthy – Win Win; Mike Mills – Beginners	Will Reiser – 50/50: Mike Cahill and Brit Marling – Another Earth; J. C. Chandor – Margin Call; Patrick deWitt – Terri; Phil Johnston – Cedar Rapids
Best First Feature	Best Documentary Feature
Margin Call: Another Earth; In the Family; Martha Marcy May Marlene; Natural Selection	The Interrupters: An African Election; Bill Cunningham New York; The Redemption of General Butt Naked; We Were Here
Best Cinematography	Best International Film
Guillaume Schiffman – The Artist: Joel Hodge – Bellflower; Benjamin Kasulke – The Off Hours; Darius Khondji – Midnight in Paris; Jeffrey Waldron – The Dynamiter	A Separation • Iran: The Kid with a Bike • Belgium / France / Italy; Melancholia • Denmark / France / Germany / Sweden; Shame • UK; Tyrannosaur • UK

=== Films with multiple nominations and awards ===
Films that received multiple nominations
Nominations	Film
5	The Artist
4	Beginners
4	The Descendants
4	Drive
4	Take Shelter
3	50/50
3	Martha Marcy May Marlene
2	Another Earth
2	Cedar Rapids
2	Margin Call
2	Midnight in Paris
2	Natural Selection

Films that won multiple awards
Awards	Film
4	The Artist
2	The Descendants
2	Margin Call

== Special awards ==
=== John Cassavetes Award ===
Pariah

- Bellflower
- Circumstance
- The Dynamiter
- Hello Lonesome

=== Truer Than Fiction Award ===
Where Soldiers Come From

- Bombay Beach
- Hell and Back Again

=== Piaget Producers Award ===
Sophia Lin – Take Shelter

- Chad Burris – Mosquita y Mari
- Josh Mond – Martha Marcy May Marlene

=== Someone to Watch Award ===
Mark Jackson – Without

- Simon Arthur – Silver Tongues
- Nicholas Ozeki – Mamitas

=== Robert Altman Award ===
- Margin Call – J. C. Chandor, Tiffany Little Canfield, Bernard Telsey, Penn Badgley, Simon Baker, Paul Bettany, Jeremy Irons, Mary McDonnell, Demi Moore, Zachary Quinto, Kevin Spacey, and Stanley Tucci
