= Nikki Reed =

American actress (born 1988)

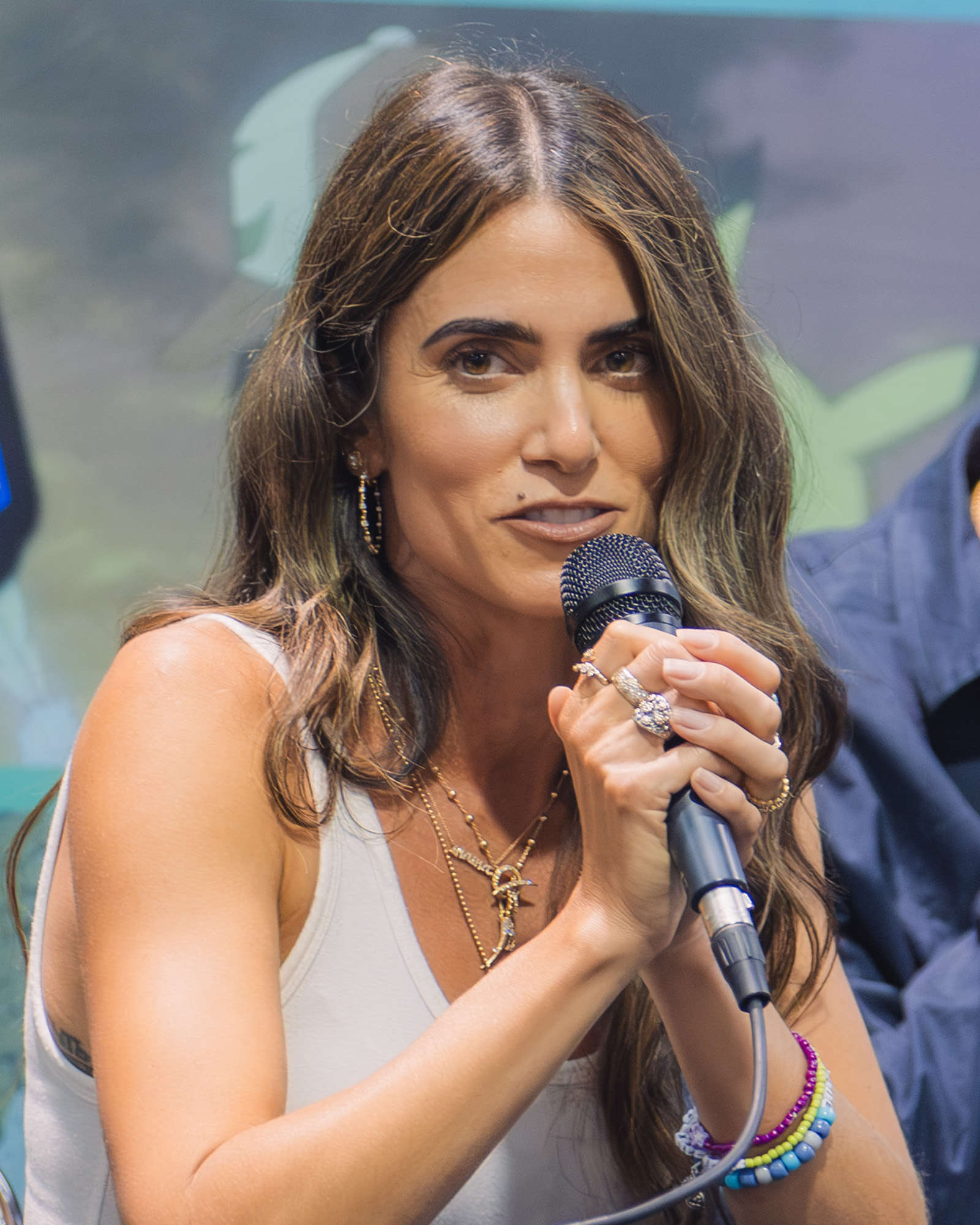
- Reed in 2026
- Born: May 17, 1988 (age 38); Los Angeles, California, U.S.
- Occupations: Actress; screenwriter; entrepreneur
- Years active: 2003–2019 (as an actress)
- Spouses: Paul McDonald (m. 2011; div. 2015); Ian Somerhalder (m. 2015)
- Children: 2

Nikki Reed (born May 17, 1988) is an American actress, screenwriter, and entrepreneur best known for her role as Rosalie Hale in The Twilight Saga (2008–12). Reed rose to prominence when she starred in and co-wrote the psychological drama film Thirteen (2003) with director Catherine Hardwicke, for which she won Best Breakthrough Performance and was nominated for Best First Screenplay at the 19th Independent Spirit Awards.

== Early life ==
Reed's mother is Cherokee-Italian whereas her father, a set designer, is Jewish. Reed was raised without religion but has identified as Jewish. She grew up around some Jewish practices, as her brother had a Bar Mitzvah.

Reed has said in numerous interviews that her early home life was "pretty complicated". Her parents divorced when Reed was two, after her mother found her father in bed with another man. She was raised by her mother. In 2002, when Reed was 14 years old, she moved out of her mother's house and began living on her own, mainly in apartments in the Los Angeles area. After Thirteen's success, Reed returned to Alexander Hamilton High School in Los Angeles, but dropped out again after a year. She said that "mothers who were sneaking into the school at lunchtime to confront and harass her about the film" were the reason for her departure. She earned a high school diploma through homeschooling.

== Acting career ==
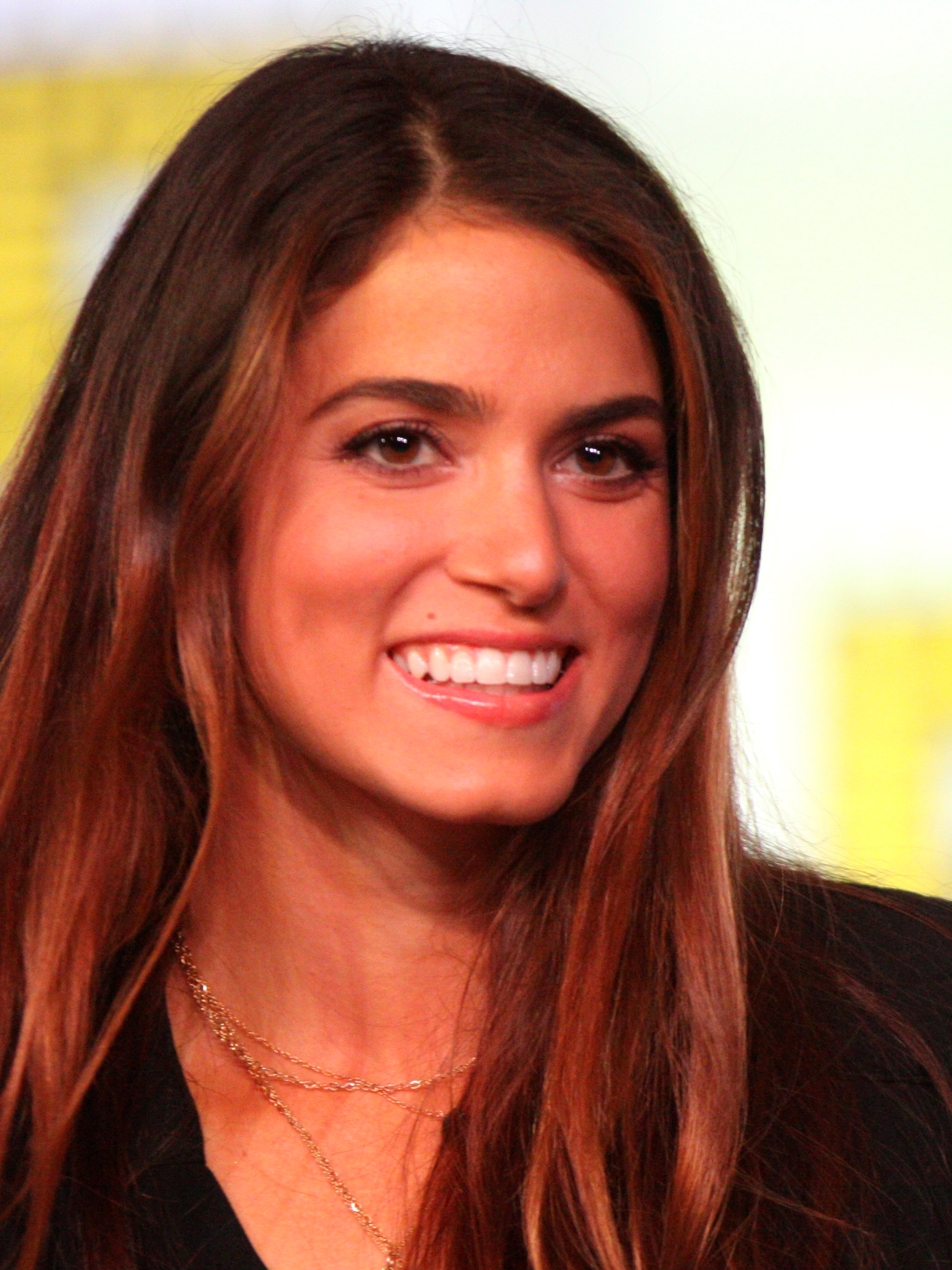
Reed at the 2012 San Diego Comic-Con

Catherine Hardwicke, an ex-girlfriend of her father's and a friend of her mother's, invited Reed to work on a script with her when she said she was interested in acting. They finished the script for the semi-autobiographical film Thirteen in six days. Producers asked Reed to play a role in the film because they had trouble casting it, as it was an "uncomfortable" role for most young actresses.

The film, also starring Evan Rachel Wood, was released in 2003 to positive reviews, gaining Reed some recognition in Hollywood as both a screenwriter and an actress. Following this, Reed was invited to appear on The Ellen DeGeneres Show and serve as host on a number of award shows, including the Young Hollywood Awards (2003) and the Independent Spirit Awards Nomination Show, followed by the West Independent Spirits Awards, both in 2004. Reed has repeatedly been cast as sexually advanced, precocious teenagers, including her character in Lords of Dogtown (2005), also directed by Hardwicke. In early 2006, she appeared on the series The O.C., playing Sadie, a new love interest for the character Ryan Atwood. Reed appeared on The O.C. at the same time as future Twilight co-stars Cam Gigandet and Jackson Rathbone.

Reed said that her early decision to avoid acting in television series or in mainstream cinema was naïve. She had thought at the time they were not right for her, but had since gained valuable experience in them. She had a lead role in Mini's First Time, which received a limited release in the United States on July 14, 2006. Reed played a teenager who, through seduction, involves her stepfather in a plot to murder her mother. Reed has noted that her character does not "understand the weight of consequence". She said she had enjoyed playing someone who she describes as "crass" and having a "trucker's mouth". Reed's character has sex scenes. As Reed was 16 at the time and legally unable to film such scenes in an explicit way, she was filmed from the back to hide her face. On February 12, 2008, it was announced that Reed would portray Rosalie Hale in the film adaption of Twilight, the first book of a popular four-novel series. Directed by Catherine Hardwicke, it became an international success.

In 2010, Jason Mewes said that he was doing a movie called K-11 with Reed and Kristen Stewart, also of Twilight. The film, directed by Stewart's mother, takes place in a dorm of the Los Angeles County Jail. It was to feature both Stewart and Reed as female characters. Later that year, Reed said that she was no longer part of the project. In July 2010, Reed joined the cast of the lady assassin action-drama Catch .44, alongside Bruce Willis, Forest Whitaker and Malin Akerman. In November 2010, it was announced that Reed would star with Hayden Panettiere in the film Downers Grove, a movie adaptation of Michael Hornburg's novel. The screenplay was written by Bret Easton Ellis, the novelist who wrote The Rules of Attraction and American Psycho.

In December 2011, it was announced that Reed joined the cast of Pawn, an indie crime thriller directed by David A. Armstrong. The film also stars Forest Whitaker, Ray Liotta, Common, Michael Chiklis, Sean Faris, Stephen Lang, Marton Csokas and Jessica Szohr. In July 2013, Reed joined the cast of the independent sports comedy Balls Out, alongside Jake Lacy, Kate McKinnon, Beck Bennett and Jay Pharoah. The film is about a group of college friends who get together in their final year to play a game of intramural football. In 2019, she appeared in an episode of the Hulu original TV show Dollface.

== Other work ==
Reed recorded a song, "Now That I've Found You", with her then-husband Paul McDonald, which debuted on Ryan Seacrest's radio show on November 15, 2011. The couple released their first EP, The Best Part, on October 29, 2012. Their song "All I've Ever Needed" is on The Twilight Saga: Breaking Dawn – Part 2 soundtrack.

In January 2013, Reed filmed Hanson's 2013 music video for their single, "Get the Girl Back", also with McDonald. The video was released in April 2013. Other well-known figures in the video include Kat Dennings, Drake Bell, Drew Seeley, Amy Paffrath, and Alex Beh.

Reed wrote a script set in New Zealand between the 1960s and the 1980s. She has said she feels more versatile than her typecasting in roles of "sexy bad girls". She has sometimes been told by producers that she is too "sexy" for a particular part. In November 2009, Reed directed a music video for her friend Sage while in London. Reed stated that they didn't have much time, or money, but she takes great pride in it.

In 2017, Reed and friend Morgan Bogle set up a sustainable jewelry brand BaYou With Love. The company works with Dell turning recycled technology into jewelry.

== Personal life ==
Reed met Paul McDonald, a singer-songwriter and former American Idol contestant, on the red carpet at the premiere of Red Riding Hood in March 2011. This moment was broadcast on an American Idol episode as part of a segment that showed the contestants attending the premiere. The couple began dating, and moved in together not long after. They confirmed their engagement in June 2011, and married on October 16, 2011, in Malibu, California. In March 2014, Reed and McDonald announced that they had separated after living apart for the previous six months due to "work obligations". Reed filed for divorce in May 2014, and the divorce was finalized on January 2, 2015.

Reed began dating actor Ian Somerhalder in mid-2014. They confirmed their engagement in February 2015, and married on April 26, 2015, in Malibu, California. They have two children: a daughter born in 2017 and a son born in 2023.

Reed is close friends with her Twilight co-star Jackson Rathbone and Spy Kids actress Alexa Vega, who was her maid of honor at her first wedding.

=== Activism ===
Reed teamed up with Staples and Do Something for their third Annual School Supply Drive in the summer of 2011. She is also an animal rights advocate. She volunteers at animal shelters in her free time and she designed a limited edition collar and leash for Gilt to benefit ASPCA. On October 22, 2014, she was honored with the ASPCA Compassion Award for her contributions to animal welfare.

Reed endorsed Senator Bernie Sanders for President in the 2016 U.S. presidential election.

== Filmography ==
Film
Year	Title	Role	Notes
2003	Thirteen	Evie Zamora	Also co-writer
2005	Man of God	Zane Berg	
2005	Lords of Dogtown	Kathy Alva	
2005	American Gun	Tally	
2006	Mini's First Time	Minerva "Mini" Drogues	
2007	Cherry Crush	Shay Bettencourt	
2008	Twilight	Rosalie Hale	
2008	Familiar Strangers	Allison	
2009	The Twilight Saga: New Moon	Rosalie Hale	
2009	Last Day of Summer	Stefanie	Also executive producer
2010	The Twilight Saga: Eclipse	Rosalie Hale	
2010	Chain Letter	Jessie Campbell	
2010	Privileged	Lauren Carrington	
2011	Catch .44	Kara	
2011	The Twilight Saga: Breaking Dawn – Part 1	Rosalie Hale	
2012	The Twilight Saga: Breaking Dawn – Part 2	Rosalie Hale	
2013	Empire State	Lizzette	
2013	Pawn	Amanda	
2013	Enter the Dangerous Mind	Wendy	
2014	Balls Out	Meredith Downs	
2014	In Your Eyes	Donna	
2014	Murder of a Cat	Greta	
2015	About Scout	Georgie	
2016	Jack Goes Home	Crystal	Also co-producer
2016	A Sunday Horse	Debi Walden	

Television
Year	Title	Role	Notes
2006	The O.C.	Sadie Campbell	6 episodes
2006	Justice	Molly Larusa	1 episode
2015–2016	Sleepy Hollow	Betsy Ross	15 episodes
2019	Dollface	Bronwyn	1 episode
2019	V-Wars	Rachel	5 episodes

Music videos
Year	Title	Artist	Notes
2005	Just Feel Better	Santana feat. Steven Tyler	
2010	No Rose Petals & Bubblebaths	Sabrina	
2012	Now That I've Found You	Nikki Reed and Paul McDonald	Also director
2012	All I've Ever Needed	Nikki Reed and Paul McDonald	
2013	Get the Girl Back	Hanson	
2015	Til It Happens to You	Lady Gaga	
2016	In Too Deep	The Sweeplings	Also director
2016	Where's the Love?	The Black Eyed Peas featuring The World	

== Awards and nominations ==
Year	Award	Category	Work	Notes	Result
2003	Nantucket Film Festival – Screenplay Award	Best Feature Screenplay	Thirteen	Shared with Catherine Hardwicke	Won
2003	Young Hollywood Awards	One to Watch – Female	Thirteen		Won
2003	Washington D.C. Area Film Critics Association Awards	Best Original Screenplay	Thirteen	Shared with Catherine Hardwicke	Nominated
2004	Independent Spirit Award	Best First Screenplay	Thirteen	Shared with Catherine Hardwicke	Nominated
2004	Independent Spirit Award	Best Debut Performance	Thirteen		Won
2004	Prism Award	Best Performance in a Theatrical Feature Film	Thirteen		Nominated
2004	Satellite Award	Best Performance by an Actress in a Motion Picture – Drama	Thirteen	Shared with Evan Rachel Wood	Nominated
2004	Satellite Award	Best Original Screenplay	Thirteen	Shared with Catherine Hardwicke	Nominated
2008	Method Fest Independent Film Festival Award	Best Ensemble	Familiar Strangers	Shared with Cast	Won
2009	Teen Choice Award	Choice Fresh Face – Female	Twilight		Nominated
2009	Scream Award	Best Ensemble	Twilight	Shared with Cast	Nominated
2010	Young Hollywood Awards	Superstar in the Making	The Twilight Saga: New Moon		Won
2010	Teen Choice Award	Most Fanatic Fans	The Twilight Saga: New Moon	Shared with Cast	Won
2011	Teen Choice Award	Choice Favorite Vampire	The Twilight Saga: Eclipse		Nominated
2012	Teen Choice Award	Scene Stealer Female	The Twilight Saga: Breaking Dawn – Part 1		Nominated
