= Jason Dohring =

American actor (born 1982)

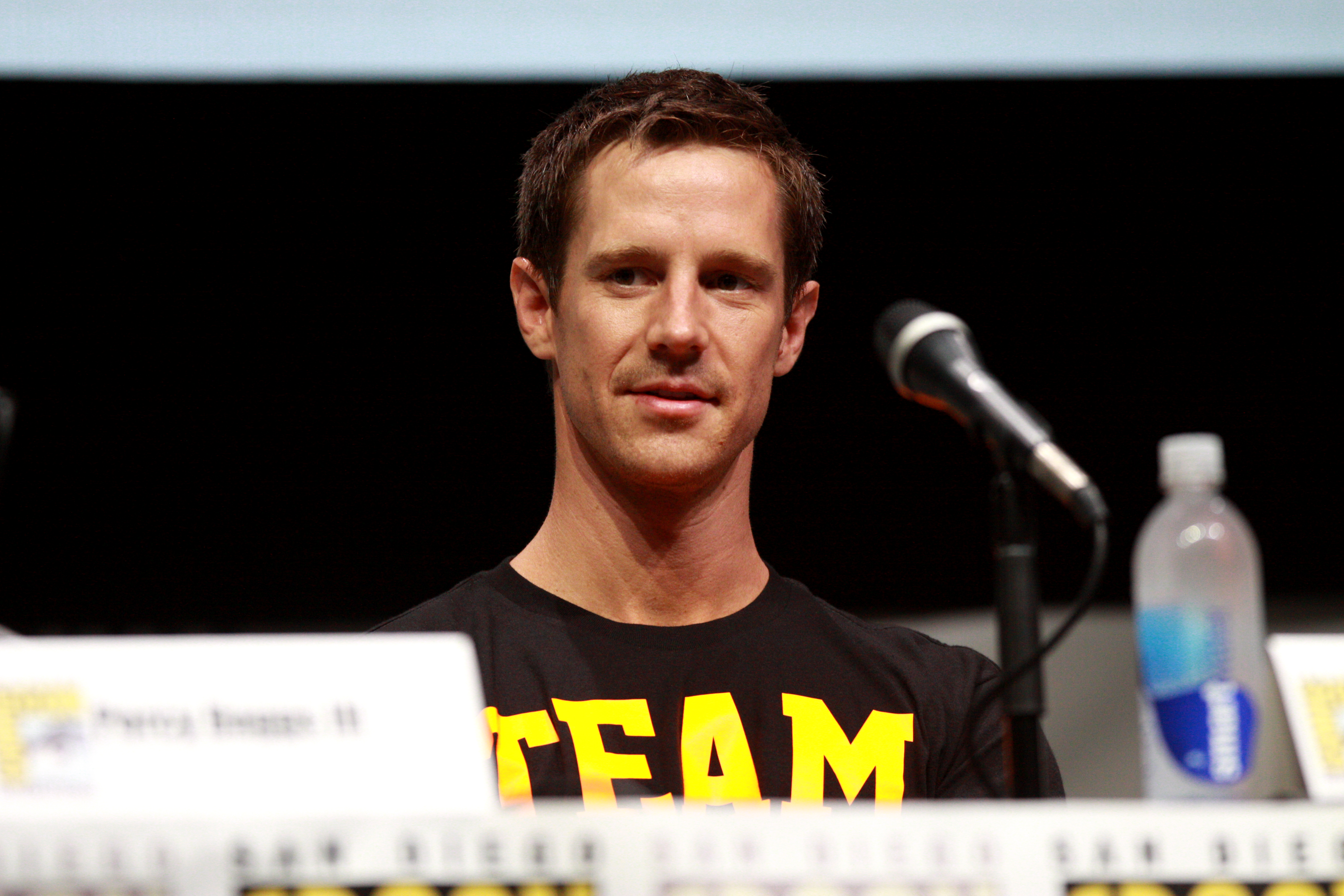
- Dohring in 2013
- Born: Jason William Dohring; March 30, 1982 (age 44); Toledo, Ohio, U.S.
- Occupation: Actor
- Years active: 1994–2021
- Spouse: Lauren Kutner (m. 2004)
- Children: 4
- Relatives: Doug Dohring (father)

Jason William Dohring (born March 30, 1982) is an American actor, known for his roles as Logan Echolls in Veronica Mars (2004–2007, 2019) and its 2014 film continuation, Josef Kostan in Moonlight (2007), Adam Carpenter in Ringer (2011), Detective Will Kinney in The Originals (2013), Chase Graves in iZombie (2015), and Terra in the Kingdom Hearts series.

== Career ==
Dohring starred as Logan Echolls in Veronica Mars from 2004 to 2007. Following its cancellation, Dohring found work with Warner Bros. and CBS, co-starring as Josef Kostan in the television series Moonlight.

In October 2008, it was announced that Dohring would return to television as Spencer in the HBO comedy series Washingtonienne.

On February 10, 2010, Dohring stated in an interview that he would be voicing a character in a Disney video game that was released in Japan that January; the game was later revealed to be Kingdom Hearts Birth by Sleep by Square Enix and Disney, and the character was Terra, with him reprising the role in Kingdom Hearts 3D: Dream Drop Distance and Kingdom Hearts III. Though his performance in Birth by Sleep was panned, he was more positively-received in later games. In May 2010, Dohring starred as Elliot Knight in Searching for Sonny, directed and written by Andrew Disney and produced by Red Productions.

In 2011, Dohring co-starred as Mr. Carpenter in The CW's series Ringer with Sarah Michelle Gellar. In 2012, Dohring made a guest appearance in Supernatural as Chronos.

In April 2013, it was announced that Dohring had been cast in the Veronica Mars film. That same year, he was cast in The CW's science fiction drama The Tomorrow People in a guest role as Killian McCrane.

In 2014, Dohring co-narrated the audio book of The Mortal Instruments: City of Heavenly Fire by Cassandra Clare with actress Sophie Turner.

From 2015 to 2016, Dohring had a recurring role in The CW series The Originals as Detective Will Kinney. In October 2016, Dohring was cast in a recurring role as Chase Graves in The CW's iZombie.

In March 2021, Dohring was cast in the recurring role of Lieutenant Commander Whitshaw in the CBS series SEAL Team.

== Personal life ==
Dohring is the son of Doug Dohring and Laurie Dohring. He married Lauren Kutner in 2004, and they have four children. Dohring is a Scientologist and has credited Scientology for his understanding of acting and career professionalism.

== Filmography ==
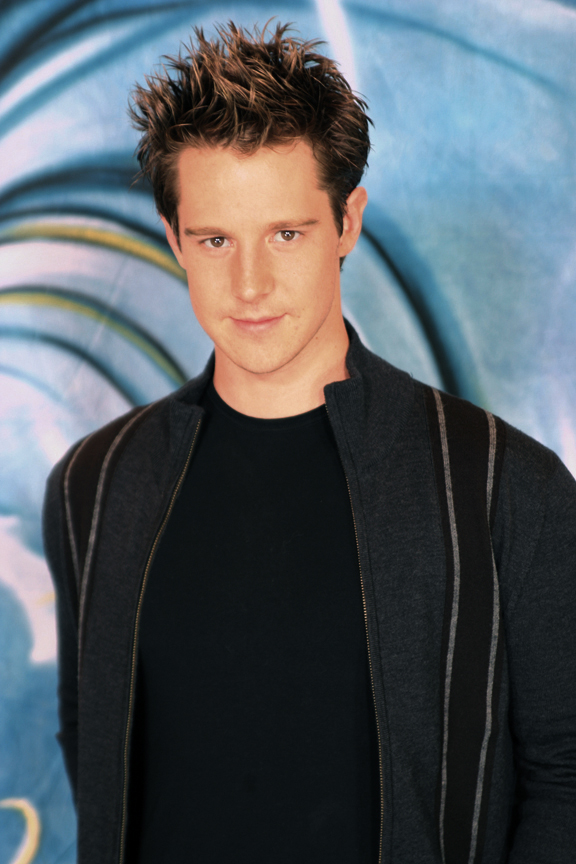
Dohring in 2007

=== Film ===
| Year | Title | Role | Notes |
|---|---|---|---|
| 1994 | Prehysteria! 2 | Roughneck #2 | Video |
| 1998 | Deep Impact | Jason | |
| 2001 | Train Quest | Joseph | |
| 2003 | Black Cadillac | Robby | |
| 2007 | The Deep Below | Will Taylor | |
| 2008 | Struck | | Short film |
| 2011 | Searching for Sonny | Elliot Knight | |
| 2014 | Veronica Mars | Logan Echolls | |
| 2015 | The Squeeze | Aaron Bolt | |
| 2019 | You Are Here | Glen | |
| 2021 | Violet | Harry White | |

=== Television ===
| Year | Title | Role | Notes |
|---|---|---|---|
| 1994 | Someone She Knows | Billy | Television film |
| 1995 | Baywatch | Isaac Klein | Episode: "Face of Fear" |
| 1995 | Journey | Cooper McDougall | Television film |
| 1996 | Picket Fences | | Episode: "Winner Takes All" |
| 1996 | Mr. Rhodes | Jared | Episode: "Pilot" |
| 1999 | 100 Deeds for Eddie McDowd | Human Eddie McDowd | Episode: "Tagged" |
| 2000 | Once and Again | Coop | Episode: "Sneaky Feelings" |
| 2000 | Ready to Run | B. Moody | Television film |
| 2001 | Roswell | Jerry | Episode: "Cry Your Name" |
| 2001 | The Parkers | Nerdy Guy | Episode: "Take the Cookies and Run" |
| 2002 | JAG | James Oliphant | Episode: "Code of Conduct" |
| 2002–2003 | Boston Public | Ian Bridgeman | 2 episodes |
| 2004 | Judging Amy | Simon Hadlock | Episode: "Werewolves of Hartford" |
| 2004 | Cold Case | Dominic LaSalle | Episode: "The Plan" |
| 2004 | The Division | Wes | Episode: "Zero Tolerance" |
| 2004 | Wedding Daze | Font | Television film |
| 2004–2007, 2019 | Veronica Mars | Logan Echolls | Main role (72 episodes) |
| 2007–2008 | Moonlight | Josef Kostan | Main role (16 episodes) |
| 2009 | Body Politic | Charlie | TV pilot |
| 2009 | Party Down | Greg | Episode: "California College Conservative Union Caucus" |
| 2009 | Washingtonienne | Spencer | Episode: "Pilot" |
| 2010 | CSI: Crime Scene Investigation | Danny Nagano | Episode: "Long Ball" |
| 2010 | Lie to Me | Martin Walker | Episode: "Beat the Devil" |
| 2011–2012 | Ringer | Mr. Carpenter | Recurring role (9 episodes) |
| 2012 | Supernatural | Chronos / Ethan Snider | Episode: "Time After Time" |
| 2013 | Rules of Engagement | Joe | Episode: "Cats & Dogs" |
| 2013 | The Tomorrow People | Killian McCrane | Episode "Kill or Be Killed" |
| 2014 | Motive | Gordon White | Episode "Bad Blonde" |
| 2015 | Portrait of Love (AKA Heart of the Matter) | Luke Dwyer | Television film |
| 2015 | The Messengers | Jeff Fairburn | Recurring role (3 episodes) |
| 2015–2017 | The Originals | Will Kinney | Season 3 and 4; recurring role |
| 2017–2018 | iZombie | Chase Graves | Seasons 3–4; recurring role (15 episodes) |
| 2019 | Bluff City Law | Blake Fullum | Episode: "Ave Maria" |
| 2020 | All Rise | Sgt. Scott Cable | Episode: "My Fair Lockdown" |
| 2021 | SEAL Team | Lieutenant Commander Whinshaw | Recurring role |

=== Video games ===
| Year | Title | Role | Notes |
|---|---|---|---|
| 2010 | Kingdom Hearts Birth by Sleep | Terra | |
| 2012 | Kingdom Hearts 3D: Dream Drop Distance | Terra | |
| 2014 | Kingdom Hearts 2.5 HD ReMIX | Terra | Archive footage |
| 2017 | Kingdom Hearts 0.2: Birth by Sleep – A Fragmentary Passage | Terra | |
| 2019 | Kingdom Hearts III | Terra | |

=== Audiobooks ===
| Year | Title | Role | Notes |
|---|---|---|---|
| 2014 | The Mortal Instruments: City of Heavenly Fire | Co-narrator | with Sophie Turner |
