= 2012 Independent Spirit Awards =

The 2012 Independent Spirit Awards can refer to:

- 27th Independent Spirit Awards, a ceremony held in 2012, honoring the films of 2011
- 28th Independent Spirit Awards, a ceremony held in 2013, honoring the films of 2012
