= Familiar Strangers =

- Film poster
- Directed by: Zack Adler
- Written by: John Bell
- Produced by: Barry R. Sisson; Marc Lieberman
- Starring: Shawn Hatosy; DJ Qualls; Tom Bower; Nikki Reed; Ann Dowd; Cameron Richardson; Georgia Mae Lively
- Release dates: March 27, 2008 (Method Fest Independent Film Festival); November 14, 2008 (United States)
- Country: United States
- Language: English
- Box office: $34,068

Familiar Strangers (formerly known as Pretzels & Pills) is a 2008 film about an American family going through the process of negotiating the changing relationships between parents and children, especially as those children grow into adulthood.

== Plot ==
The film follows the Worthington family through a four-day Thanksgiving family gathering. Brian, who has moved away and kept his distance for the past several years, is reluctantly returning for this family tradition carrying the baggage of conflict with his father, Frank.

Frank feels he has failed as a father, having lost the ability to connect with his maturing children. When the children grew to adulthood and created their own identities and lives, Frank replaced them with his pets, new children “who never have to grow up”.

The film is populated by Frank and Brian, mother Dottie who holds the reins on this family beneath the surface, brother Kenny who as a twenty-something has not yet found his path, sister Erin who is struggling to find herself after a painful divorce, and Erin’s young daughter Maddy, truly wise beyond her years.

Through this story and the conflict and communication that occur, the Worthington family recognizes the friendship and love that can exist between parents and their adult children.

== Cast ==
- Shawn Hatosy as Brian Worthington
- DJ Qualls as Kenny Worthington
- Tom Bower as Frank Worthington
- Nikki Reed as Allison
- Ann Dowd as Dottie Worthington
- Cameron Richardson as Erin Worthington
- Georgia Mae Lively as Maddy

== Reception ==
Review aggregator Rotten Tomatoes reports that 40% of critics have given the film a positive review based on 5 reviews, with an average score of 5.0/10.
