= Joel Hodge =

American cinematographer

- Born: United States
- Occupation: Cinematographer

Joel Hodge is an American cinematographer, best known for being the Director of Photography for the independent film Bellflower. Hodge was nominated for the 2012 Independent Spirit Award for Best Cinematography, losing to the significantly bigger budget The Artist. The award was announced the day before The Artist won the Academy Award for Best Picture. Eric Kohn of IndieWire criticized the inclusion of The Artist into awards that should recognize lesser known films. He suggested Hodge should have been given the recognition. Screen Junkies also included both cinematographers among three it named Best Cinematographers for 2012.

John Anderson of Variety singles out Hodge for his menacing lighting and artful lensing. Anderson also rates Hodge as one of his "10 to watch".

Hodge was able to master the one-of-a-kind camera designed and built by the director of the film, Evan Glodell. It combined vintage camera parts, bellows and Russian lenses, around a Silicon Imaging SI-2K Mini Digital Cinema camera. It required a chain of people to carry the Macintosh computer and batteries necessary for the contraption to work.

Hodge also appeared in the film Bellflower in a small role.

== Early life ==
Joel Hodge grew up in Camarillo, California using his mother's remarried name, as Joel Sharpe. He was fascinated by Arnold Schwarzenegger movies, particularly the Terminator series. He was given a camera as a young teenager, from that point forward, very little activity escaped the view of his camera. He took video production classes at Camarillo High School where he later graduated.

Hodge's first professional job was working for Creative Stuff Digital Video, working on a variety of professional projects with director Andrew Hecker, including WOW! Women of Wrestling.

Across the hall was the start up operation of Stim TV, which had hired Evan Glodell to do their production and his brother to do the technology behind the online network. Hodge and Glodell showed each other their quirky productions and became friends. When Stim TV went into full operation, Hodge was hired. The programming was largely music videos, independent films and interviews to promote both genres, mostly shot by Glodell, Hodge and several others who would later become Coatwolf Productions. The first long-form original programming for the network was the Boss of the Glory series, written, directed and starring Glodell, shot by Hodge. Another series called Easter A.D. followed.

Hodge also worked for Fox Sports Net's XSTV traveling around the country to shoot extreme sports events like skateboarding or motorcycle jumping.

As part of the Coatwolf crew he has also shot music videos for Cursive, SoSo and Ritmo Legendz. And they worked on Vincent Grashaw's award-winning short Savanna in the four years it took to complete Bellflower.
