= You Hurt My Feelings (2023 film) =

2023 film by Nicole Holofcener

- Theatrical release poster
- Directed by: Nicole Holofcener
- Written by: Nicole Holofcener
- Produced by: Anthony Bregman; Stefanie Azpiazu; Nicole Holofcener; Julia Louis-Dreyfus
- Starring: Julia Louis-Dreyfus; Tobias Menzies; Michaela Watkins; Arian Moayed; Owen Teague; Jeannie Berlin
- Cinematography: Jeffrey Waldron
- Edited by: Alisa Lepselter
- Music by: Michael Andrews
- Production companies: FilmNation Entertainment; Likely Story
- Distributed by: A24
- Release dates: January 22, 2023 (Sundance); May 26, 2023 (United States)
- Running time: 93 minutes
- Country: United States
- Language: English
- Box office: $5.7 million

You Hurt My Feelings is a 2023 American comedy-drama film written, produced, and directed by Nicole Holofcener. It stars Julia Louis-Dreyfus, Tobias Menzies, Michaela Watkins, Arian Moayed and Jeannie Berlin. The film was shot in New York City in May 2022. It had its world premiere at the Sundance Film Festival on January 22, 2023, and was released in the United States on May 26, 2023, by A24.

== Plot ==
Beth is a successful memoirist and creative writing teacher in New York City who has recently written her first novel. She is in a loving marriage with Don, a therapist, and they have a 23-year-old son, Elliot, who works at a cannabis store. Don is self-conscious about aging and struggles with his patients, many of whose problems he is not engaged with.

Beth's agent tells her the novel needs multiple revisions, causing Beth to doubt her work. She is reassured by Don, who reads a draft of the book and suggests looking for another agent who is more enthusiastic about it. While shopping for socks, Don confesses to his brother-in-law and actor Mark that he does not like Beth's novel but feels he cannot be honest with her. Beth accidentally overhears their conversation when entering the shop with her sister Sarah, and Beth's faith in their relationship is shaken. In an attempt to reassure her, Sarah tells Beth she occasionally lies to her husband about his acting performances, but this does not comfort Beth. Mark later gets publicly fired from a play and considers quitting his acting career, but Sarah convinces him to continue as it is only his first time getting fired.

Beth continues to struggle and grows increasingly annoyed with Don. At Mark's birthday dinner, Beth finally tells Don she overheard what he said. Though Don tries to tell Beth she is missing context, he eventually reveals that he does not like her book but did not want to discourage her. When Elliot accuses Beth of putting pressure on him to be extraordinary, Don and Beth finally discuss their differences. They talk about white lies they have told each other, and Beth realizes the way she reacts is partly due to her controlling father's verbal abuse from her childhood. She eventually finds a new, more enthusiastic agent.

One year later, Beth's novel is published. Don and Beth, now reconciled, celebrate their anniversary together. Mark achieves success in another play, and Elliot finishes the first draft of a play he is writing and gives copies to his parents. Don undergoes cosmetic surgery to treat his eye bags, and Beth tells him that he is going to look great. The two go to bed and begin reading Elliot's draft.

== Cast ==
- Julia Louis-Dreyfus as Beth
- Tobias Menzies as Don
- Michaela Watkins as Sarah
- Arian Moayed as Mark
- Owen Teague as Elliot
- Amber Tamblyn as Carolyn
- David Cross as Jonathan
- Zach Cherry as Jim
- LaTanya Richardson Jackson as Sylvia
- Sarah Steele as Frankie
- Jeannie Berlin as Georgia
- Clara Wong as Ali
- Deniz Akdeniz as Vince
- Sunita Mani as Dr. Allen
- Josh Pais as himself

== Production ==
In October 2021, it was announced Julia Louis-Dreyfus would star in and produce the film, then titled Beth and Don, with Nicole Holofcener directing from a screenplay she wrote. In May 2022, Tobias Menzies, Michaela Watkins, Arian Moayed, Owen Teague, Jeannie Berlin, David Cross and Amber Tamblyn joined the cast of the film.

Principal photography began in May 2022, in New York City. Cinematographer Jeffrey Waldron said, "I worked to build a natural, inviting New York look that didn't distract from the unfolding story, but brought cinematic punctuation to its important human moments". To achieve this, he used an Arri Alexa Mini camera with custom-adjusted Panavision Primo lenses. In order to make the film feel "filmic, human and handmade", he further softened and reduced contrast in prep with the help of a custom film emulation LUT.

== Release ==
A24 acquired the U.S. distribution rights at the 2021 American Film Market, with Stage 6 Films acquiring rights to the film for Latin America, Germany, Switzerland, Spain, Eastern Europe, the CIS, the Benelux, Greece, the Middle East, Turkey, the Nordics, Asia and South Africa. The film had its world premiere at the Sundance Film Festival on January 22, 2023. It was released in theatres in the United States on May 26, 2023.

== Reception ==
=== Box office ===
In the United States and Canada, You Hurt My Feelings was released alongside The Little Mermaid, Kandahar, The Machine, and About My Father, and was projected to gross around $1 million from 912 theatres over its four-day Memorial Day opening weekend. The film grossed $474,000 on its first day, and debuted to $1.4 million over the three-day weekend (and $1.8 million over a four-day time frame).

=== Critical response ===
On the review aggregator website Rotten Tomatoes, 95% of 219 critics' reviews are positive, with an average rating of 7.7/10. The website's consensus reads: "Smart, funny, and above all entertaining, You Hurt My Feelings finds writer-director Nicole Holofcener as sharply perceptive as ever." Metacritic, which uses a weighted average, assigned the film a score of 80 out of 100, based on 43 critics, indicating "generally favorable" reviews. Audiences surveyed by PostTrak gave the film an overall 75% positive score, with 42% saying they would definitely recommend it.
