= Festivus Film Festival =

Annual film festival

- Location: Denver, Colorado, USA
- No. of films: 50-60
- Language: International

The Festivus Film Festival is a Denver, Colorado-based annual film festival held in November. It features independent films at historical venues in the Denver Highlands, including the Bug Theatre and the Oriental Theater. The Festivus Film Festival was founded in 2008, suspended operation in 2013 due to budget constraints and relaunched in 2019 after getting support from the Denver art centre and other NGOs. The festival lasts for five days and plays a variety of films including features, short films, animation and music videos. It is the largest independent film festival in Denver.

== History ==
The festival was named after Festivus, a holiday celebrated on December 23 which was introduced in the 1997 Seinfeld episode The Strike. The festival founders liked and adapted the Festivus motto: "Festivus for the rest of us". The Festivus Film Festival was started to promote high-quality independent films in Denver, and provide an intelligent, "indie-friendly" audience for filmmakers.

The Festivus Film Festival expanded considerably since its inaugural year in 2008. In 2009 it expanded to a four-day event and added a filmmaker/VIP lounge at each venue. In 2010 the festival featured 12 world premieres, and had filmmakers from as far as Turkey and Australia attend to present their works. The subsidiary Laugh Track Comedy Festival was created in 2010 as a spin-off from Festivus' comedy shorts block (also called Laugh Track.) Also in 2012, MovieMaker Magazine named the Festivus Film Festival one of the "20 Coolest Film Festivals" in the country.

== Previous winners ==
=== 2020 ===
Best Editing: I will be back

Best Cinematography: The Web

Best Animation: Kitchen Duties

Best Music Video: Twice as Tall

Best Short Short: Hibiscus

Best Experimental: Renege

Best Documentary Short: I am just Black

Best Documentary Feature: Soldiers In the Artic

Best Narrative Short: Why

Best Narrative Feature: Fly Away

=== 2012 ===
Best Editing: A Finger, Two Dots, Then Me

Best Cinematography: Ghosts of Old Highways

Best Animation: 999.999.999

Best Music Video: 100 Monkeys for Modern Times

Best Short Short: Halbschlaf

Best Experimental: Self-Sabotage

Best Documentary Short: The Forgotten Fruit

Best Documentary Feature: Facets of Winter

Best Narrative Short: Science of Death

Best Narrative Feature: Searching for Sonny

=== 2011 ===
Best Editing: Calling on Others (Scott LeDuc & Andrew Matthews)

Best Cinematography: Brant Hadfield for The Last Legend

Best Animation: Noella Borie's The Face Shop

Best Music Video: Evan Nix for Tour Life (Total Ghost)

Best Short Short: Joe Petrilla's THE LINE

Best Experimental: Adam Badlotto's Only in Dreams

Best Documentary Short: Robert Sickels' Walla Walla Wiffle

Best Documentary Feature: Awakening the Skeena

Best Narrative Short: Marisa Brown's Rain for Morgan

Best Narrative Feature: Boy Wonder

=== 2010 ===
Best Editing: The Ballad of Angel Face

Best Cinematography: Stoney

Best Animation: Little Old Ladies

Best Music Video: The Atro-City Sleepers

Best Short Short: Black Ops Arabesque

Best Experimental: The Magnitude of the Continental Divides

Best Documentary Short: Between the Lip and Nasal Passageway; A Modern Account of the Moustache

Best Documentary Feature: Rouge Ciel

Best Narrative Short: The Godmother

Best Narrative Feature: Racewalker

=== 2009 ===
Best Editing: And What Remains

Best Cinematography: Placebo

Best Music Video: Mr. Bungle - Retrovertigo

Best Experimental: Railed

Best Animation: Gerald's Last Day

Best Short Short: Interpretation

Best Doc Short: Reefer Madness

Best Documentary: The Cost of Oil

Best Narrative Short: Compact Only

Best Narrative Feature: The Project

=== 2008 ===
Best Narrative Short: Partially True Tales of High Adventure!

Best Short Short: The Seed

Best Experimental: Standing on a Whale

Best Music Video: DeNardo

Best Animation: Hope Springs Eternal

Best Documentary Short: In Times of War: Ray Parker's Story

Best Feature Documentary: Beauty24

Best Narrative feature: Wasting Away

== See also ==
- Festivus - the holiday celebrated on December 23.
