= BriTANicK =

American Internet sketch comedy duo

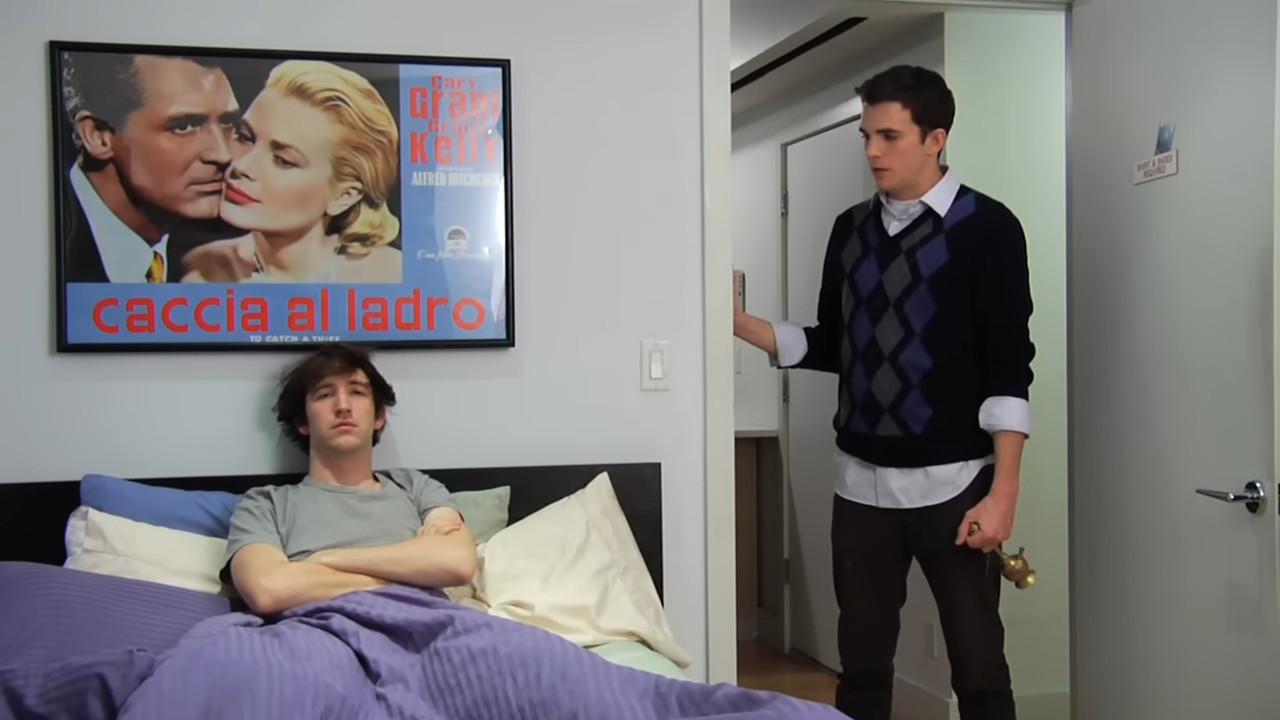
- BriTANicK in their 2012 short, "The Coach". Brian McElhaney is in bed; Nick Kocher is standing.

Comedy career
- Medium: Internet comedy, writing, television
- Genres: Internet comedy; sketch comedy
- Subject: Everyday life
- Brian McElhaney
- Born: August 8, 1986 (age 40); Atlanta, Georgia, U.S.
- Education: Atlanta International School; New York University
- Nick Kocher
- Born: January 15, 1986 (age 40); Atlanta, Georgia, U.S.
- Education: The Paideia School; New York University
- Spouse: Karen Gillan (m. 2022)
- Children: 1

BriTANicK (/braɪˈtænɪk/) is an internet sketch comedy duo from Atlanta, Georgia, that consists of Brian McElhaney and Nick Kocher. McElhaney graduated from the Atlanta International School and Kocher graduated from The Paideia School. They attended New York University together. The duo's videos have been featured on internet video sites including YouTube, CollegeHumor, Cracked, Break, and FunnyOrDie. BriTANicK was nominated by the ECNY Awards as Best Sketch Comedy Group in New York in 2008 and by Comedy Central's inaugural Comedy Awards for best web video. In 2012, BriTANicK appeared in Joss Whedon's adaptation of Much Ado About Nothing.

They also portrayed the Cartoon Network mascots during the Check It Era during 2010 until 2016.

== History ==
Both members of the duo started performing and creating videos while they were students at New York University. They started officially performing as BriTANicK in 2008, when they opened for Robin Williams at the SF Sketchfest. Since then, they have continued to create internet sketches, as well as performing around the country. They have performed three shows at the Upright Citizens Brigade Theatre in New York: "Begging for Approval", "The Infinity Prison", and "The Monthly Mankerthon". Kocher and McElhaney perform sketch regularly at UCB as well as stand-up and improv comedy around New York City. A pilot for a BriTANicK TV show was ordered by Comedy Central in 2014. The pilot, which was ultimately never sold, was written by and starred the duo alongside Natalie Palamides, Maya Erskine, and Jessy Hodges.

In 2016, Kocher and McElhaney were hired as writers by NBC's Saturday Night Live.

The pair are regular performers in the monthly Stamptown comedy variety show hosted by Zach Zucker, appearing in their Los Angeles and Edinburgh Festival Fringe performances. The two appear in the 2026 Stamptown Netflix special.

=== Internet sketches ===
"The Coach (featuring Joss Whedon)", a BriTANicK sketch from 2012

BriTANicK were featured regularly on Cracked.com and CollegeHumor.. Their sketch "Pillow Talk" featured Private Practice's Chris Lowell. They were featured as "Kings of DotComedy" on G4's Attack of the Show!.

In the spring of 2020, the duo directed three episodes of Making Fun with Akilah and Milana for Comedy Central digital.

=== Reviews, awards and festivals ===
BriTANicK has been reviewed in the Charleston City Paper and Time Out Chicago, and was named a Time Out New York "Don't Miss" critic's pick in 2009.

The duo has performed in SF Sketchfest, NYC Sketchfest, Chicago Sketchfest, and Piccolo Spoleto in Spoleto Festival USA. In 2008 they won the Seattle Sketchfest Video Contest and NY Comedy Festival's "Web Video Cram-Off". Their sketch, "Academy Award Winning Movie", resulted in coverage on the websites of the Huffington Post and Time magazine as well as praise from Roger Ebert, Joss Whedon, Stephen Fry, and Ashton Kutcher. They were nominated for The Comedy Awards' "Best Viral Original" and the ECNY Awards' "Best Comedic Video".

In 2022 and 2024 they performed at the Edinburgh Festival Fringe. In 2024 they directed Demi Adejuyigbe's performance at the Edinburgh Festival Fringe.

== Personal life ==
Nick Kocher married Scottish actress Karen Gillan in May 2022 at Castle Toward in Dunoon, Scotland.

== Filmography ==
=== As writers and directors ===
- The Goodwin Games (2013) (as writers)
- Saturday Night Live (2016–2017) (as writers)
- Pizza Movie (2026) (as directors and writers)
- Over Your Dead Body (2026) (as writers)

=== Brian McElhaney as actor ===
Year	Title	Role	Notes
2009	Mercy	Assistant Manager	Episode: "I'm Not That Kind of Girl"
2011	Arthur	College Student	
2011	Searching for Sonny	Gary Noble	
2011	Young Adult	Book Associate	
2012	Much Ado About Nothing	Second Watchman	
2014	How I Met Your Mother	Justin	Episode: "Sunrise"
2014	Unforgettable	Officer Tim Gosling	Episode: "East of Islip"
2014	The Amazing Spider-Man 2	Times Square Bystander	
2014	Balls Out	Chance	
2015	Dude Bro Party Massacre III	Turtleneck Bro	
2015	HitRecord on TV	Little Boy Boom	Episode: "Re: The Number 2"
2017	Adam Ruins Everything	Assistant Director	Episode: "Adam Ruins Conspiracy Theories"
2019	Plus One	Martin the Bartender	
2026	Pizza Movie	Brian	
TBA	Thud †		Post-production

=== Nick Kocher as actor ===
Year	Title	Role	Notes
2011	Louie	Young Eddie	Episode: "Eddie"
2011	Searching for Sonny	Calvin Knight	
2011–2012	I Just Want My Pants Back	Lench	7 episodes
2012	Much Ado About Nothing	First Watchman	
2014	How I Met Your Mother	Kyle	Episode: "Sunrise"
2014	Balls Out	Grant	
2015	Dude Bro Party Massacre III	Flannel Bro	
2015	HitRecord on TV	Arachned	Episode: "Re: The Number 2"
2016	Another Period	Vanderbilt #2	Episode: "The Prince and the Pauper"
2022	The Bubble	Scott The EPK Guy	
2023	Late Bloomers	Benj	
2026	Pizza Movie	Nick	
