= Michael Hogan (Canadian actor) =

Canadian actor (born 1949)

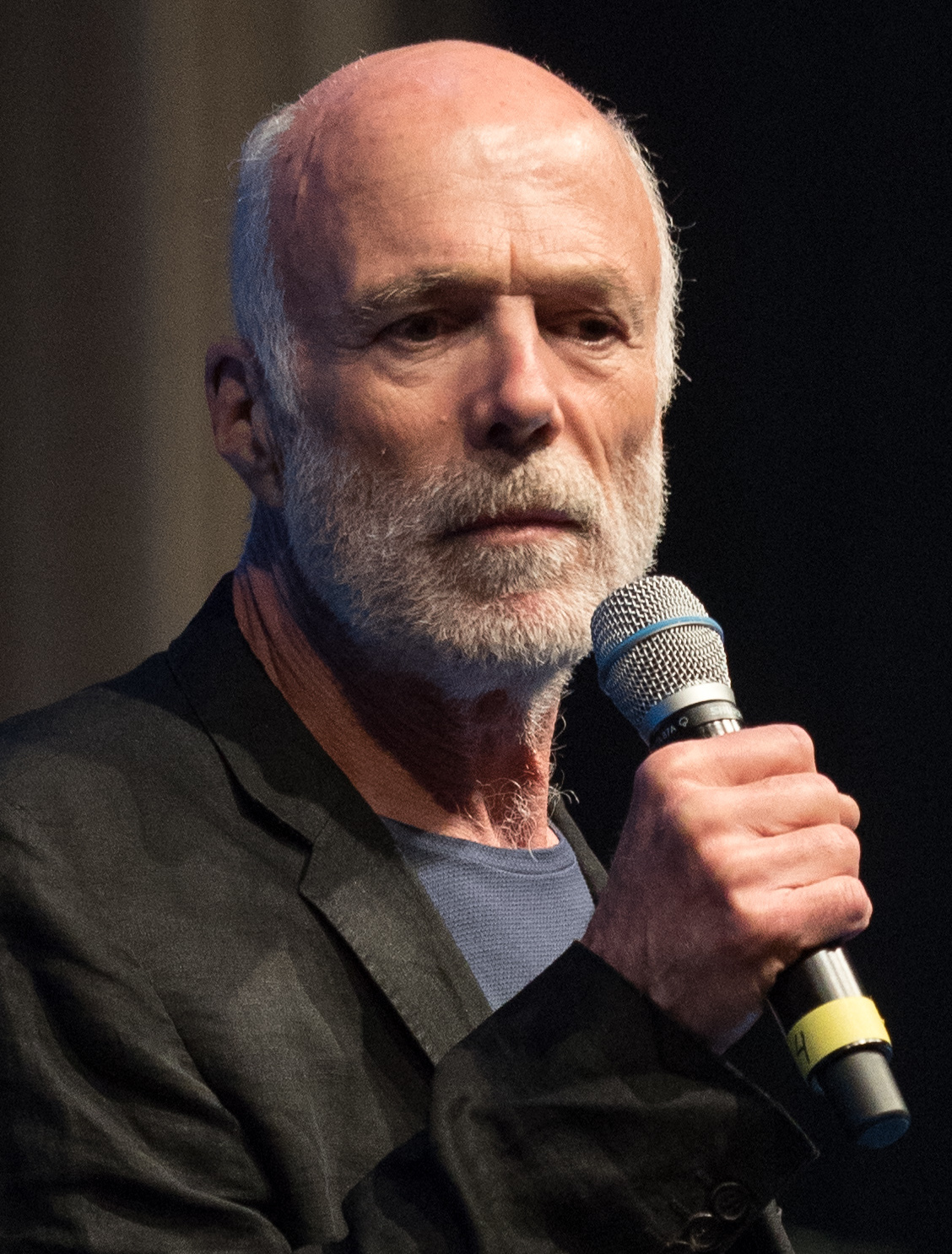
- Hogan at the 2018 FedCon
- Born: March 13, 1949 (age 77); Kirkland Lake, Ontario, Canada
- Education: National Theatre School of Canada
- Occupation: Actor
- Years active: 1978–present
- Spouse: Susan Hogan
- Children: 4, including Gabriel

Michael Hogan (born March 13, 1949) is a Canadian actor best known for playing Colonel Saul Tigh in the 2004 Battlestar Galactica series. Other notable roles include Billy in The Peanut Butter Solution and villainous werewolf hunter Gerard Argent in Teen Wolf. He also lent his voice to Armando-Owen Bailey in the Mass Effect series, General Tullius in The Elder Scrolls V: Skyrim, and Doc Mitchell in Fallout: New Vegas.

== Biography ==
Michael Hogan was born in Kirkland Lake, Ontario in 1949, raised in North Bay, Ontario and studied at National Theatre School of Canada.

== Career ==
Hogan began his career in 1978 and has starred in numerous TV shows, plays, radio dramas and operas. He started in plays at the Shaw Festival.

He made his film debut in the Peter Fonda trucker picture High-Ballin' (1978). He and his wife soon became a popular television couple, as the stars of the 1983 Canadian series Vanderberg and the 1986 Canadian-German series The Little Vampire. In 1985, he also starred in the children's film The Peanut Butter Solution.

Hogan portrayed Jack Budyansky in Diplomatic Immunity (1990) and in Solitaire (1991). He was nominated for a Genie Award for Best Supporting Actor for the former role and won it for the latter. In 1998, he portrayed Tony Logozzo in Cold Squad (1998). Hogan was nominated for the Gemini Award for Best Actor in a Dramatic Program or Miniseries, for the 2003 telefilm Betrayed.

From 2003 to 2009, Hogan starred as Colonel Saul Tigh, Executive Officer of the Battlestar Galactica on the Sci Fi Channel television program Battlestar Galactica. He portrayed Irwin Fairbanks in The L Word (2004–2006). He also had a recurring role on the hit MTV show Teen Wolf (2012–2017) as Gerard Argent, the werewolf-hunting grandfather of Allison Argent and the latest nemesis of main protagonist, Scott McCall.

He made guest appearances on Millennium (1997), The Outer Limits (1997), Andromeda (2002), in the two-hour premiere of Monk (2002), Dollhouse (2009), Numb3rs (2009), Warehouse 13 (2009), Psych (2010), Supernatural (2011), and the third season of the sitcom Husbands.

Hogan's movies include Road to Saddle River, Clearcut, Stella, Cowboys Don't Cry and The Cutting Edge and the telefilms Dead Man's Gun, Shadow Lake, Scorn, Shadow Realm and Nights Below Station Street, for which he received the Manitoba Motion Picture Industry Association's Blizzard Award for Best Leading Actor. He appeared in the romance horror film Red Riding Hood (2011).

Hogan has also lent his voice to the video game industry, providing the voice of Captain Armando-Owen Bailey in the role-playing games (RPG) Mass Effect 2 and Mass Effect 3, as well as the opening character, Doc Mitchell, in Fallout: New Vegas. Hogan also voiced the character General Tullius in the RPG, The Elder Scrolls V: Skyrim. Most recently, he lent his voice as Samael in the American release of the Korean multiplayer role-playing game TERA (2012).

== Personal life ==
On February 17, 2020, Hogan sustained a brain injury after falling and hitting his head. This caused paralysis of his left side, memory loss, and dysphagia. The slip and fall accident happened at a dinner event following a Battlestar Galactica fan convention.

== Filmography ==
=== Film ===
Year	Title	Role	Notes
1978	High-Ballin'	Reggie	
1979	Title Shot	Dyce	
1980	Klondike Fever	Will Ryan	
1981	Gas	Guido Vespucci	
1982	Deadly Eyes	Cop in Subway	
1983	Candy the Stripper	Larry	Direct-to-video
1985	The Peanut Butter Solution	Billy	
1986	Lost!	Bob	
1988	Palais Royale	Sergeant Leonard	
1988	Cowboys Don't Cry	Ron Grady	
1990	Stella	Billy	
1991	Diplomatic Immunity	Jack Budyansky	
1991	Solitaire	Al	
1991	Clearcut	Bud Rickets	
1992	The Visit	Bristol	Short film
1992	The Cutting Edge	Doctor	
1994	I Love a Man in Uniform	Detective Itch	
1994	Road to Saddle River	Louis	
1995	Soul Survivor	Donald	
2000	Marine Life	Humphrey	
2001	Gasline	Kenny	Short film
2005	A Simple Curve	Jim	
2008	The Day the Earth Stood Still	General	
2010	Confined	Fitz Wolfram	
2010	Hunt to Kill	Lawson	
2011	Under	Frank	Short film
2011	Pleased to Meet You	Bob	Short film
2011	Red Riding Hood	The Reeve	
2011	Hypoxia	Captain	Short film
2011	Searching for Sonny	Principal Faden	
2012	By My Side	Russell Grant	Short film
2014	Balls Out	Mr. Albrecht	
2019	The Devil Has a Name	Judge	
2020	Sonic the Hedgehog	Air Force Chief of Staff	
2025	The Keepers	Scientist	Short Film

=== Television ===
Year	Title	Role	Notes
1980–1984	The Littlest Hobo	Chuck/Lucky/Policeman	Guest role; 3 episodes
1981	The Intruder Within	Chili	Television film
1983	Vanderberg	Hank Vanderberg	
1984	He's Fired, She's Hired	Freddie's Ad Man	Television film
1985	The Suicide Murders	Bill Ward	Television film
1986	Kay O'Brien	Sean McCandliss	Episode: "Big Vacation"
1986	Adderly	Shankill	Episode: "Adderly with Eggroll"
1986–1987	The Little Vampire	Robert Besker	Recurring role; 6 episodes
1988	The Twilight Zone	Sheriff Roy	Episode: "The Hunters"
1988–1991	Street Legal	Warden Vanderklat/Brent Elliot	Guest role; 3 episodes
1989	E.N.G.	Crothers	Episodes: "E.N.G. Pilot: Part 1" and "Part 2"
1990	Mom P.I.	Vic Stevens	Episode: "Spinal Trap"
1990	War of the Worlds	Nash	Episode: "The True Believer"
1990	Counterstrike	Father Milady	Episode: "Now and at the Hour of Our Death"
1990	The Last Best Year	Billy Haller	Television film
1991	African Skies	Hooker	Episode: "Crocodile Tears"
1992	Beyond Reality	Jebidiah Smith	Episode: "The Burning Judge"
1992	I'll Fly Away	Eddie	Episode: "Ruler of My Heart"
1992	Hearts Afire	Tom Dybala Jr.	Episode: "Smithersgate"
1993	Road to Avonlea	Mr. Dunn	Episode: "Home Movie"
1993	Matrix	Dr. Martin Sands	Episode: "Conviction of His Courage"
1993	Lifeline to Victory	Chief Engineer	Television film
1994	Kung Fu: The Legend Continues	Duncan	Episode: "The Innocent"
1995	End of Summer	The General	Television film
1996	Jake and the Kid	Gate	Episodes: "Full Circle" and "Looks Can Be Deceiving"
1996	For Those Who Hunt the Wounded Down	Alvin	Television film
1996	The Boys Next Door	Dr. Racine	Television film
1996	A Kidnapping in the Family		Television film
1997	Millennium	Captain Bigelow	Episode: "The Wild and the Innocent"
1997	Two	Officer Pierce	Episode: "Leap of Faith"
1997	The Outer Limits	Dr. Lawrence Sinclair	Episode: "Last Supper"
1997	Ellen Foster	Principal	Television film
1997–1998	Dead Man's Gun	Flagg/Sheriff Haynes	Episodes: "My Brother's Keeper" and "Ties That Bind"
1998	Due South	George	Episode: "Mountie Sings the Blues"
1998	Nights Below Station Street	Joe Walsh	Television film
1998–1999	Cold Squad	Detective Tony Logozzo	Series regular (seasons 1–2); 24 episodes
1998	Nothing Sacred		Television film
1999	Shadow Lake		Television film
1999	First Wave	Mr. Bennett	Episode: "Normal, Illinois"
2000	Earth: Final Conflict	Detective	Episode: "Apparition"
2000	Scorn	Ralph	Television film
2001	UC: Undercover	Sergeant Drake	Episode: "City on Fire"
2001	Night Visions	Larry	Episode: "Harmony"
2001	So Weird	Sam Hardy	Episode: "Gone Fishin"
2002	The Eleventh Hour	Milt	Also known as Bury the Lead; Episode: "The 37-Year-Itch"
2002	Mysterious Ways	Andy Anderson	Episode: "Logan Miller"
2002	Monk	Warren St. Claire	Episodes: "Mr. Monk and the Candidate: Part 1" and "Part 2"
2002	Andromeda	Crescent	Episode: "The Leper's Kiss"
2002	Just Cause	Dane's Lawyer	Episode: "Lies, Speculation & Deception"
2002	The Investigation	Ray	Television film
2002	Shadow Realm	Larry	Television film
2003	Betrayed	Doug Bryce	Television film
2003	Battlestar Galactica	Colonel Saul Tigh	Television mini-series
2004	Blue Murder	Colin Gladden	Episode: "Spooks"
2004–2006	The L Word	Irwin Fairbanks	Recurring role; 4 episodes
2004–2009	Battlestar Galactica	Colonel Saul Tigh	Main role; 69 episodes
2006	Battlestar Galactica: The Resistance	Colonel Saul Tigh	Webseries; 6 episodes
2007	Robot Chicken	Colonel Saul Tigh (voice) / Matt Trakker (voice)	Episode: "Rabbits on a Roller Coaster"
2007	Battlestar Galactica: Razor	Colonel Saul Tigh	Television film
2008–2009	Battlestar Galactica: The Face of the Enemy	Colonel Saul Tigh	Webseries; 3 episodes
2009	Warehouse 13	Warren Bering	Episode: "Nevermore"
2009	Dollhouse	Bradley Karrens	Episode: "Belle Chose"
2009	Numb3rs	Ray Till	Episode: "Old Soldiers"
2009	Battlestar Galactica: The Plan	Colonel Saul Tigh	Television film
2010	Psych	William Tanner	Episode: "The Head, the Tail, the Whole Damn Episode"
2010	Smallville	General Slade Wilson	Episodes: "Patriot" and "Icarus"
2011	Heartland	Archie Morris	Episode: "What's in a Name?"
2011	Supernatural	Sheriff Osbourne	Episode: "Slash Fiction"
2011	Ice Road Terror	Terry Lowman	Television film
2011	Snowmageddon	Fred Baker	Television film
2012	Fairly Legal	George Algers	Episode: "Satisfaction"
2012–2013	Arctic Air	Doc Hossa	Recurring role; 4 episodes
2012–2013, 2016–2017	Teen Wolf	Gerard Argent	Main Role (Season 2), Recurring role (Seasons 3, 5–6); 22 episodes
2013	Republic of Doyle	Phonse	Episode: "Gimme Shelter"
2013	The Mentalist	Sean Barlow	Episode: "Red John's Rules"
2013	Falling Skies	General Donovan	Episode: "At All Costs"
2013	Cult	Dr. Robert Kimble	Episode: "Flip the Script"
2013	Husbands	Scott	Recurring role; 5 episodes
2013	Romeo Killer: The Chris Porco Story	Terry Kindlon	Television film
2013	Haven	Lincoln Harker	S4E12: "When the Bough Breaks"
2014	The Tomorrow People	Senator Kelsey	Episodes: "Kill Switch" and "Son of Man"
2014	The Christmas Secret	Marshal Wilson	Television film
2015	Fargo	Otto Gerhardt	Recurring role; 6 episodes
2016	12 Monkeys	Dr. David Eckland	Recurring role; 6 episodes
2016	The Man in the High Castle	Hagan / Ex-Preacher	Guest role; 4 episodes
2017	You Me Her	Emma's father	Guest role; 2 episodes
2017	Zoo	IADG Officer Grissam	Guest role; 4 episodes
2018	Criminal Minds	Benjamin David Merva	Guest role; 2 episodes
2018	The Magicians	Edwin	Episode: "The Art of the Deal"
2018	No Easy Days	Bob Carson	8 episodes
2018	Chilling Adventures of Sabrina	Grandfather Kinkle	Episode: "Chapter 7: Feast of Feasts"
2020	When Calls the Heart	Archie Grant	Guest role; 2 episodes

=== Video games ===
Year	Title	Role	Notes
2010	Mass Effect 2	Captain Bailey (voice)	
2010	Red Dead Redemption	The Local Population	
2010	Fallout: New Vegas	Doc Mitchell (voice)	
2011	The Elder Scrolls V: Skyrim	General Tullius (voice)	
2012	Mass Effect 3	Commander Armando-Owen Bailey (voice)	
2012	TERA: Rising	Commander Samael (voice)	
2021	Mass Effect Legendary Edition	Commander Armando-Owen Bailey (voice)	Archival audio
