= The Dynamiter (film) =

- Film poster
- Directed by: Matthew Gordon
- Written by: Brad Ingelsby
- Produced by: Matthew Gordon; Kevin Abrams; Mike Jones; Nate Tuck; Amile Wilson; Art Jones; Merilee Holt
- Starring: William Patrick Ruffin
- Cinematography: Jeffrey Waldron
- Edited by: Kevin Abrams; Brandon Boyd
- Music by: Casey Immoor
- Distributed by: Film Movement
- Release date: February 2011 (Berlin)
- Running time: 73 minutes
- Country: United States
- Language: English

The Dynamiter is a 2011 American drama film directed by Matthew Gordon and starring William Patrick Ruffin. It is Gordon's feature directorial debut.

== Plot ==
In Mississippi, fourteen-year-old Robbie Hendrick must look after his half brother Fess when their mother runs off one summer. Things take a turn when their older brother Lucas comes back into their lives.

== Cast ==
- William Patrick Ruffin
- John Alex Nunnery
- Joyce Baldwin
- Patrick Rutherford
- Ciara McMillan
- Byron Hughes
- Sarah Fortner
- Mike Jones

== Production ==
The film was shot in Mississippi.

== Release ==
The film premiered at the Berlin International Film Festival in February 2011. It was also released at the Zeitgeist Multi-Disciplinary Arts Center in New Orleans on September 28, 2012.

In February 2012, Film Movement acquired North American distribution rights to the film.

== Reception ==
Mike Scott of the Times-Picayune awarded the film two stars out of five.

== Nominations ==
At the 27th Independent Spirit Awards, the film was nominated for Best Cinematography and the John Cassavetes Award.
