= Richard Folmer =

American actor (1942–2022)

- Born: February 13, 1942; Cortland, New York, U.S.
- Died: January 11, 2022 (aged 79); Shreveport, Louisiana, U.S.
- Occupations: Actor, theatre director

Richard Sloan Folmer (February 13, 1942 – January 11, 2022) was an American actor who was based in Shreveport, Louisiana. He appeared in a variety of notable stage plays, television programs and films. Folmer also co-founded "The Company", a theater company located in Shreveport. Folmer latterly served as Artistic Director of the East Bank Theatre and Gallery at the Bossier Arts Council. His training included Hilberry Classic Theatre and personal coaching by acting coaches Cliff Osmond and Bob Everson. He died on January 11, 2022, at the age of 79.

== Filmography ==
- JFK (1991)
- Doublecrossed (1991, TV)
- Fatal Justice (1993)
- Murder in the Heartland (1993, TV)
- Dangerous Curves (1993, TV Series)
- Fatal Deception: Mrs. Lee Harvey Oswald (1993, TV)
- The St. Tammany Miracle (1994)
- Walker, Texas Ranger (1995–1997, TV Series)
- Heaven & Hell: North & South, Book III (1994, TV Miniseries)
- OcchioPinocchio (1994)
- Last Fair Deal (1995)
- The Stars Fell on Henrietta (1995)
- Kingfish (1995, TV)
- The Man Next Door (1997)
- Just Sue Me (2000)
- Seventy-8 (2004)
- Mad, Bad and Dangerous to Know (2005)
- Factory Girl (2006)
- Mad Money (2008)
- Straw Dogs (2011)
- Searching for Sonny (2011)

== Theatre ==
- Death of a Salesman
- Shadowlands
- My Fair Lady
- Sunshine Boys
- Gene
- Harvey
- Zorba
- Inherit the Wind
- Fiddler on the Roof
- Broadway Bound
- The Nerd
- Brighton Beach Memoirs
