= Jeffrey Waldron =

American cinematographer and director

- Born: U.S.
- Occupations: Cinematographer, director
- Years active: 2002–present

Jeffrey Waldron, ASC is an American cinematographer and director. Waldron worked on various feature films and TV series, including Little Fires Everywhere, Dear White People, Transpecos, You Hurt My Feelings, Haunted Mansion, and Daredevil: Born Again. With Shannon Service he also co-directed Ghost Fleet, a 2018 award-winning documentary about immigrants tricked into forced labor on fishing ships in Thailand.

== Career ==
Jeffrey served as cinematographer on the 2011 film The Dynamiter, for which he was nominated for Best Cinematography at the Independent Spirit Awards. In 2012, he made his directorial debut with series Remixed, which was nominated for best directing (non-fiction) at the IAWTV Awards. In 2018, he co-directed the film Ghost Fleet, along with Shannon Service, which premiered at the Toronto International Film Festival, and was nominated for a News and Documentary Emmy Award in the category of "Outstanding Cinematography: Documentary" in 2020. He served as cinematographer for the film You Hurt My Feelings directed by Nicole Holofcener, which premiered at the 2023 Sundance Film Festival.

In 2026, Jeffrey was invited to join the American Society of Cinematographers (ASC).

== Selected filmography ==
=== Feature films ===
Year	Title	Contribution	Note
2025	Poetic License	Cinematographer	
2023	Haunted Mansion	Cinematographer	
2023	You Hurt My Feelings	Cinematographer	
2018	Ghost Fleet	Co-director, cinematographer	
2016	Transpecos	Cinematographer	
2016	We Go On	Cinematographer	
2015	A Light Beneath Their Feet	Cinematographer	
2012	Rising from Ashes	Cinematographer	
2011	Searching for Sonny	Cinematographer	
2011	The Dynamiter	Cinematographer	

=== Television ===
Year	Title	Contribution	Note
2026	Daredevil: Born Again	Cinematographer	Season 2; 4 episodes
2022	A League of Their Own	Cinematographer	Pilot
2021	The Morning Show	Cinematographer	2 episodes
2021	Gossip Girl	Cinematographer	Pilot
2020	Little Fires Everywhere	Cinematographer	4 episodes
2019	Mrs. Fletcher	Cinematographer	7 episodes
2019	GLOW	Cinematographer	1 episode
2018	Here and Now	Cinematographer	4 episodes
2017	Brockmire	Cinematographer	8 episodes
2017	Dear White People	Cinematographer	10 episodes
2016	Crunch Time	Cinematographer	6 episodes
2012	Remixed	Director, cinematographer	6 episodes

== Awards and nominations ==
Year	Result	Award	Category	Work	Ref.
2020	Nominated	News and Documentary Emmy Awards	Outstanding Cinematography: Documentary	Ghost Fleet	
2019	Won	Palm Springs International Film Festival	John Schlesinger Award	Ghost Fleet	
2019	Won	Minneapolis–Saint Paul International Film Festival	Spotlight Documentary Competition	Ghost Fleet	
2019	Won	International Film Festival and Forum on Human Rights	Creative Documentary	Ghost Fleet	
2018	Nominated	Doc NYC	Viewfinders Grand Jury Prize	Ghost Fleet	
2018	Nominated	El Gouna Film Festival	Feature Documentary Competition	Ghost Fleet	
2018	Nominated	Hamptons International Film Festival	Documentary Feature	Ghost Fleet	
2013	Nominated	IAWTV Awards	Best Directing (Non-Fiction)	Remixed	
2012	Nominated	Independent Spirit Awards	Best Cinematography	The Dynamiter	
2006	Won	Newport Beach Film Festival	Best Cinematography, Short Film	The Honeyfields	
