= Andrew Disney =

American film director

- Born: Fort Worth, Texas, U.S.
- Occupations: Film director, screenwriter

Andrew Disney is a Texas filmmaker and writer. He is best known for directing the comedy films Balls Out (2014) and Crunch Time (2016).

== Early life and education ==
Disney was born in Fort Worth, Texas, U.S., the third of four children. He attended Trinity Valley School alongside fellow future filmmaker Greg Kwedar. After graduating from high school, Disney attended New York University's Tisch School of the Arts, where he received a bachelor's of fine arts in Film Production.

== Career ==
Disney worked as a director in Los Angeles. After spending five years there, he moved back to Texas after he and his wife purchased an antique venue in Round Top, Texas. He now works in North Texas, working in real estate and developing residential neighborhoods.

== Filmography ==
Year	Title	Director	Writer	Ref.
2003	What's It Worth	Yes	Yes	
2007	Frank's Last Shot	Yes	No	
2011	Searching for Sonny	Yes	Yes	
2014	Balls Out	Yes	No	
2016	Crunch Time	Yes	No	
