= Jay Pharoah =

American actor & comedian (born 1987)

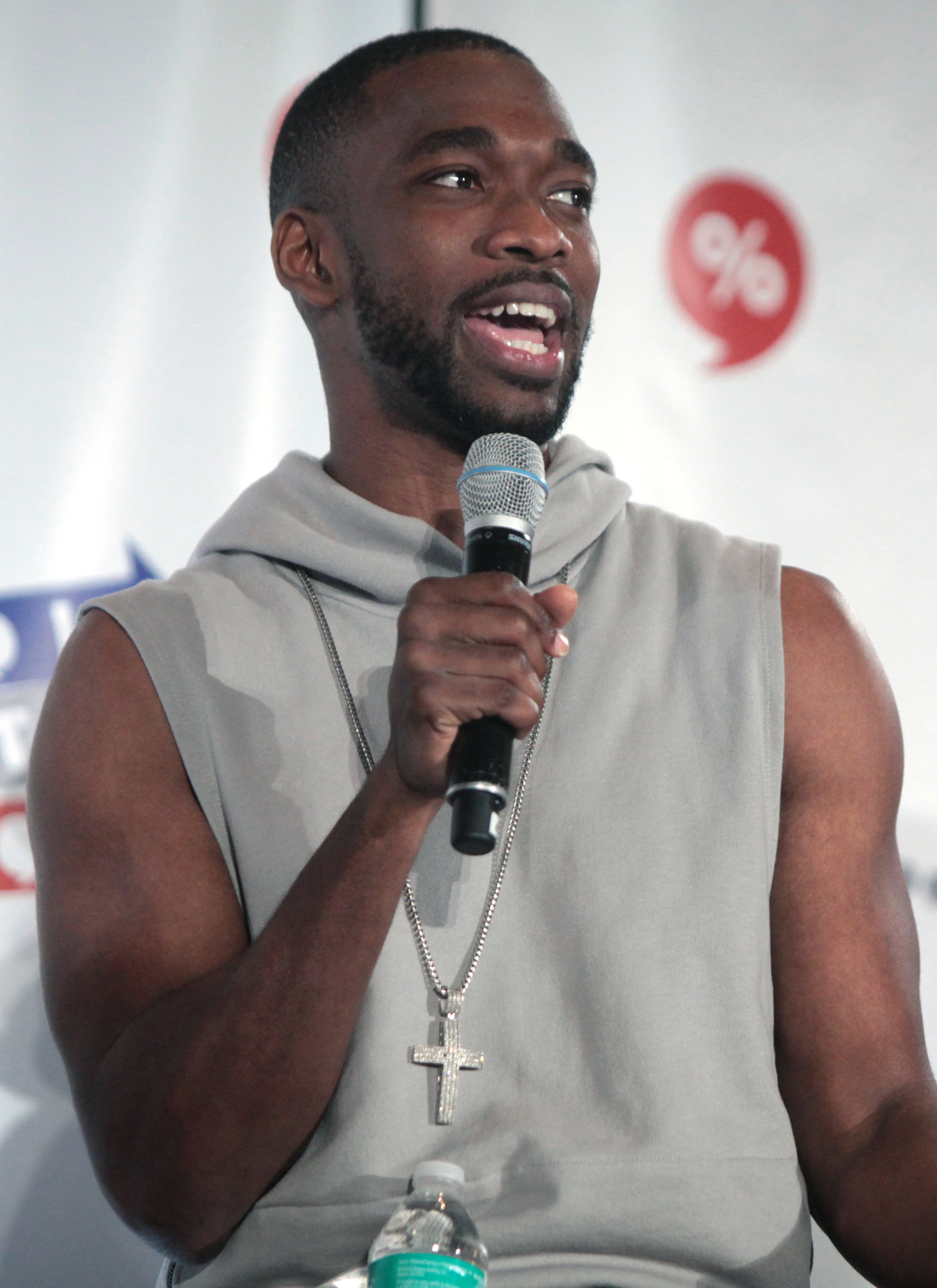
- Pharoah in 2016
- Born: Jared Antonio Farrow; October 14, 1987 (age 39); Chesapeake, Virginia, U.S.
- Education: Tidewater Community College (AA, AS)

Comedy career
- Years active: 2010–present
- Medium: Stand-up; television; film
- Genres: Observational comedy; impressions; sketch comedy; blue comedy; racial humor; satire
- Subjects: African-American culture; American politics; pop culture; racism; race relations; current events; human sexuality
- Website: www.jaypharoahworld.com

Jared Antonio Farrow (born October 14, 1987), better known by his stage name Jay Pharoah, is an American stand-up comedian and actor. He was a cast member on the NBC sketch comedy series Saturday Night Live from 2010 to 2016. In 2015, he was ranked the 55th greatest Saturday Night Live cast member by Rolling Stone magazine. He also voiced characters such as Meena's Grandfather in Sing (2016) and Noah in The Mitchells vs. the Machines (2021).

== Early life ==
Pharoah was born and raised in Chesapeake, Virginia. He began performing impersonations at age six and cites Gilbert Gottfried's character Iago in Aladdin as his first voice, explaining, "My father put me in a talent competition a couple of months later, and out of the whole thing I got fifth place."

In 2005, Pharoah graduated from Indian River High School in Chesapeake. One of his characters, Principal Daniel Frye, is heavily influenced by IRHS's former principal, James Frye. Pharoah graduated from Tidewater Community College with an Associate of Arts degree in 2008 and an Associate of Science in 2010. He briefly attended Virginia Commonwealth University.

== Career ==
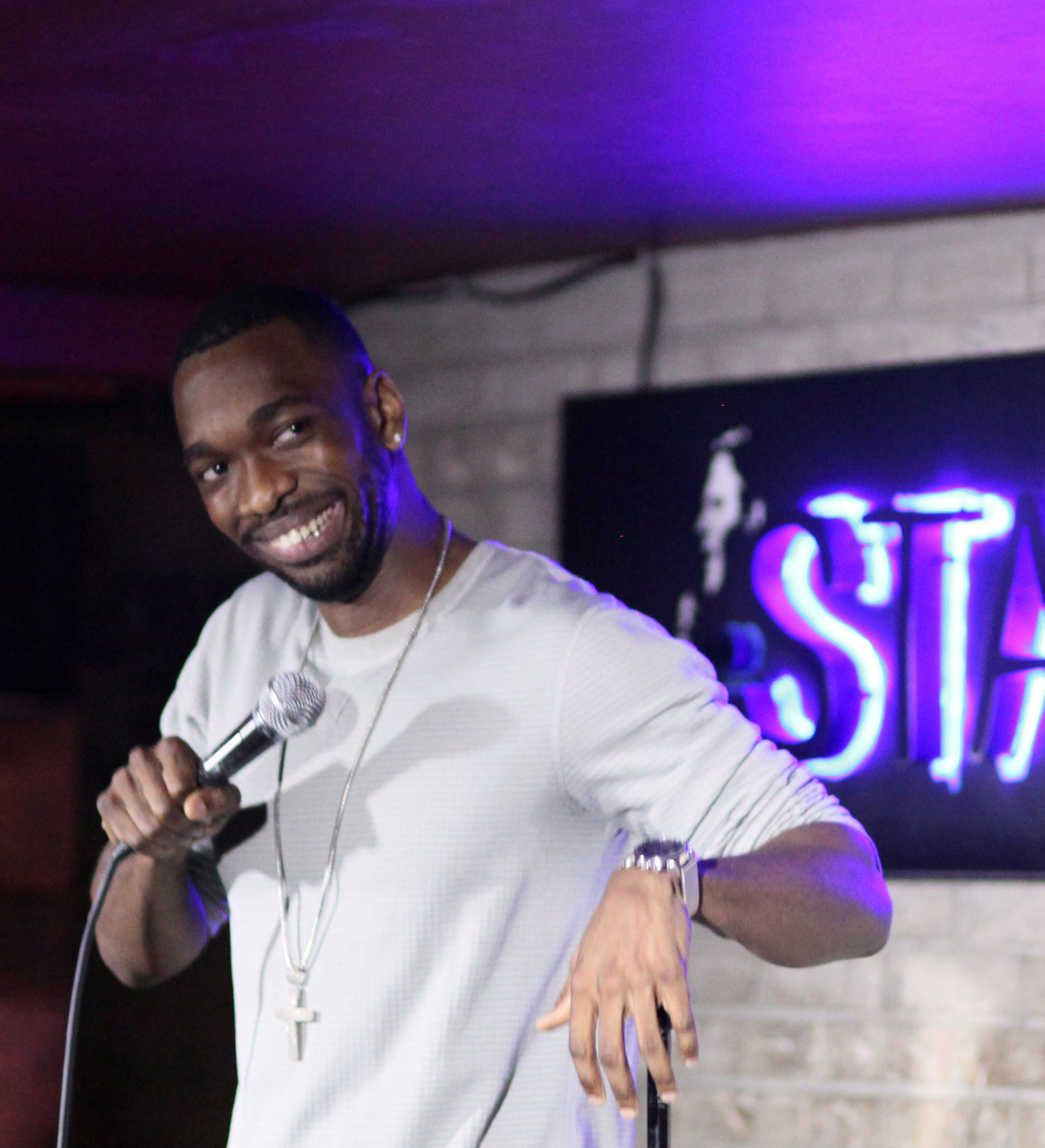
Pharoah at The Stand in June 2016

Pharoah has been performing stand-up comedy in community theaters and at comedy clubs in Virginia since he was 15. He at one point toured with Corey Holcomb and Charlie Murphy.

He became known for his many celebrity impressions, including Barack Obama, Will Smith, Martin Lawrence, Bernie Mac, DMX, Jay-Z, 50 Cent, Clarence Thomas, Rick James, Eddie Murphy, Charlie Murphy, Dwayne Johnson, Kevin Hart, Chris Rock, Chris Tucker, Dave Chappelle, Mr. T, Morgan Freeman, Danny Glover, Kanye West, Stephen A. Smith, Shaquille O'Neal, Tracy Morgan, Orlando Bloom, Peter Dinklage, Michael Strahan and Denzel Washington.

Pharoah became an internet phenomenon when his impersonation of Barack Obama became widely seen on YouTube.

=== 2010–2016: Saturday Night Live ===
In 2010, Pharoah was hired by Saturday Night Live as a featured performer for the show's 36th season. Producer, Lorne Michaels in a 2014 interview with Vulture said he "...does a really good Obama." Pharoah debuted on Saturday Night Live on September 25, 2010 and was regarded by Rob Moynihan of TV Guide as the "breakout player" for that season, for his impressions of Barack Obama, Ben Carson, Kanye West, Jay-Z, Stephen A. Smith, Will Smith, Eddie Murphy, Tracy Morgan, Chris Rock, Dave Chappelle, Chris Tucker, Michael Strahan, Lil Wayne, Kevin Hart, Kendrick Lamar, Shaquille O'Neal and Denzel Washington. He debuted his SNL impersonation of Barack Obama in the 38th season premiere on September 15, 2012, succeeding Fred Armisen in that role. Rolling Stone magazine described him as the "Jimmy Fallon of 2 Chainz impressions."

Pharoah appeared in the independent film Lola Versus, released by Fox Searchlight Pictures in June 2012. In 2014, he had a small role in the buddy cop film Ride Along, starring Ice Cube and Kevin Hart, and appeared in the independent film Balls Out, a sport comedy starring fellow SNL cast members Beck Bennett and Kate McKinnon.

In 2016, he appeared in a commercial for Old Navy, alongside fellow SNL cast members Nasim Pedrad and Cecily Strong. On August 8, 2016, it was announced Pharoah alongside fellow cast member Taran Killam would be exiting the show ahead of its 42nd season. Pharoah hosted the American Music Awards of 2016 with model Gigi Hadid. Pharoah has been working on his first album with record producer Myles William.

In 2024 Pharoah started hosting The Quiz with Balls on Fox.

== Personal life ==
=== 2020 police encounter ===
In June 2020, Pharoah released footage showing how he had been detained at gunpoint by police several months earlier while in his neighborhood, after he matched the description of a wanted black man wearing grey sweatpants and shirt. He released the footage in response to the George Floyd protests. Officers of the Los Angeles Police Department detained Pharoah, with an officer kneeling on Pharoah's neck similar to what happened in the murder of George Floyd. After the officers confirmed Pharoah's identity with an online search, they apologized and let him go.

=== Religion ===
Jay Pharoah is a Christian.

== Filmography ==
=== Film ===
Key
†	Denotes films that have not yet been released

Year	Title	Role	Notes
2012	Lola Versus	Randy	
2013	Underdogs	Announcer 2	
2014	Ride Along	Runflat	
2014	Balls Out	Dan	
2014	Top Five	Mike	
2016	Get a Job	Skeezy D	
2016	Sing	Meena's Grandfather (voice)	
2018	Unsane	Nate Hoffman	
2019	How to Fake a War	Harry Hope	
2020	Bad Hair	Julius	
2020	2 Minutes of Fame	Deandre	
2020	All My Life	Dave Berger	
2021	The Mitchells vs. the Machines	Noah (voice)	
2021	Resort to Love	Jason King	
2022	The Blackening	Shawn	
2023	Spinning Gold	Cecil Holmes	
2023	The Venture Bros.: Radiant Is the Blood of the Baboon Heart	Nuno Blood (voice)	
2023	Urkel Saves Santa: The Movie	Jay-Z (voice)	Direct-to-video
2024	Running on Empty	Sid	
TBA	The Adventures of Drunky	TBA (voice)	In production

=== Television ===
Year	Title	Role	Notes
2010–2016	Saturday Night Live	Various	Main cast (season 36-41)
2011	The Cookout 2	Eddie O	TV movie
2014	Portlandia	Jay-Z (voice)	Episode: "Ecoterrorists"
2016–2017	Legends of Chamberlain Heights	Montrel, Randy (voice)	Main cast
2017	BoJack Horseman	Man on the Street, Dashawn Manheim (voice)	2 episodes
2017	White Famous	Floyd Mooney	Main cast
2017–2024	Family Guy	Skee-Lo, Kanye West, Kanye Canes, Brick Baker, Reverend Lucius, Moses Beauford (voices)	Recurring role; Also consulting producer (2022–present)
2018	SuperMansion	Various	3 episodes
2018	Champaign ILL	Lou	Recurring cast
2019–2023	A Million Little Things	Omar Howard	3 episodes
2020	The Masked Singer	Self	Guest judge
2020	Loafy	Zookeeper Dan (voice)	Recurring cast
2020–2021	Nickelodeon's Unfiltered	Host	TV series
2021	Robot Chicken	Barack Obama (voice)	Episode: "May Cause Your Dad to Come Back With That Gallon of Milk He Went Out for 10 Years Ago"
2022	That's My Jam	Self	Episode: "Jay Pharoah & Nikki Glaser vs. Terry Crews & Dan Finnerty"
2022	A Black Lady Sketch Show	Lavonte	Episode: "Bounce Them Coochies, Y'all!"
2022	Out of Office	Neal	TV movie
2022	Bubble Guppies	Buster (voice)	Episode: "The Solar Light Spectacular!"
2022–2023	American Dad!	Mr. Fritz / Angry Husband (voice)	2 episodes
2022–2024	The Simpsons	Drederick Tatum (voice)	5 episodes
2023–present	Invincible	Bulletproof, Komodo Dragon, Data Twin #1, Various (voice)	Recurring cast
2024	Good Times: Black Again	Junior (voice)	Main
2024	Sausage Party: Foodtopia	Food in Crowd (voice)	4 episodes
2024–present	The Quiz with Balls	Self	Host

=== Video games ===
- Call of Duty: Infinite Warfare (2016) – Andre
- Invincible VS (2026) - Bulletproof
