= Evan Glodell =

American film director

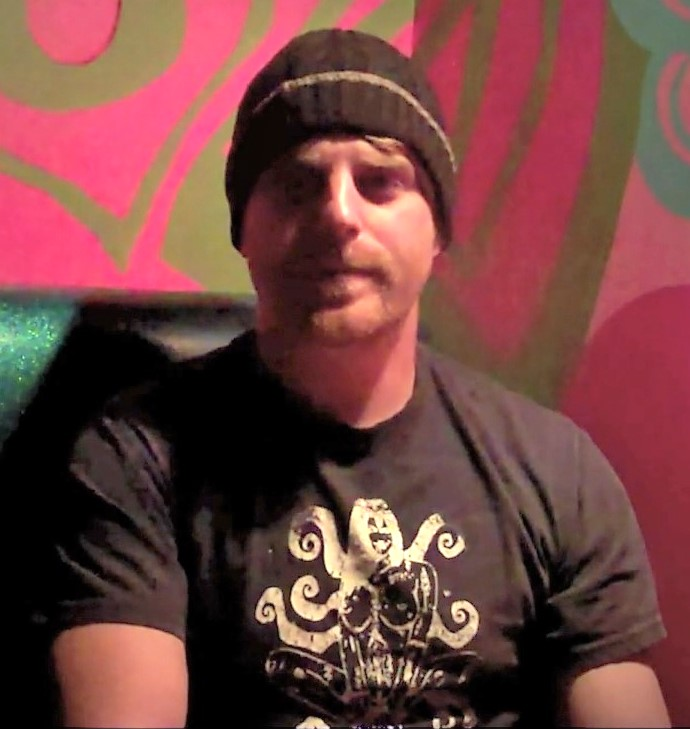
- Glodell in 2011
- Born: Baraboo, Wisconsin, United States
- Occupations: Film director, film producer, screenwriter, actor

Evan Glodell is an American feature film director, producer, writer, and actor, best known for directing the indie microbudget film Bellflower.

== Early life ==
Glodell was born in Baraboo, Wisconsin, and briefly attended the University of Wisconsin Milwaukee before dropping out to pursue a career in filmmaking.

== Career ==
Prior to the release of Bellflower, Glodell directed, wrote and starred in the show Boss of the Glory that aired on Stim-TV network. He also directed the 2009 music video Let Me Up by Cursive.

Glodell is a member of Coatwolf Productions, a collaborative group of actors and filmmakers.

== Other work ==
Glodell designed a camera known as the Coatwolf Model II, which was used to film Bellflower. The Coatwolf Model II is a modified SI-2K Digital Cinema camera with a 4x5 imaging plane.

During the production of Bellflower, Glodell built several prototypes of the flamethrower that is central to the plot of Bellflower. Glodell also worked alongside co-producer and gaffer Paul Edwardson to make custom modifications to two key vehicles that appear in the film, "Medusa" and "Speed Biscuit".

== Filmography ==
Year	Film	Type	Credited as				
Year	Film	Type	Director	Producer	Writer	Editor	Actor
2011	Bellflower	Feature Film	Yes	Yes	Yes	Yes	Yes
TBA	Chuck Hank and the San Diego Twins	Feature Film	No	Yes	No	No	Yes
TBA	Canary	Feature Film	Yes	Yes	Yes	Yes	Yes
