= Crunch Time (web series) =

American science fiction comedy drama web series

- Genre: Science fiction Comedy; Drama
- Created by: Andrew Disney; Bradley Jackson
- Starring: Avery Monsen; Jessy Hodges; Nicholas Rutherford; Samm Levine; Kirk C. Johnson; Brent Morin; Michael Hyatt
- Music by: Steve Moore
- Country of origin: United States
- Original language: English
- No. of seasons: 1
- No. of episodes: 6

Production
- Executive producers: Andrew Disney; Bradley Jackson; Burnie Burns; Matt Hullum; Doreen Copeland
- Producers: Russell Wayne Groves; Andrew Lee; David James Ward
- Cinematography: Jeffrey Waldron
- Running time: 20–25 minutes

Original release
- Network: Rooster Teeth
- Release: September 11 – October 16, 2016

Crunch Time is an American science fiction comedy drama series created by Andrew Disney and Bradley Jackson. It premiered on Rooster Teeth's website on September 11, 2016.

The series follows a group of students who have built a machine that allows them to enter people's dreams. They have somehow caused a black hole to form in their laboratory, leading them to having to explain their actions to the authorities.

The series made its television debut in the United States on El Rey Network on January 8, 2019.

== Cast ==
- Avery Monsen as Sam
- Jessy Hodges as Hannah
- Nicholas Rutherford as Berkman
- Samm Levine as Connor
- Kirk C. Johnson as Larry
- Brent Morin as Hobbs
- Michael Hyatt as Mullins

== Episodes ==
=== Season 1 (2016) ===
| No. | Title | Directed by | Written by | Original release date |
|---|---|---|---|---|
| 1 | "The Beginning" | Andrew Disney | Andrew Disney and Bradley Jackson | September 11, 2016 |
| 2 | "The Brain Frame" | Andrew Disney | Andrew Disney and Bradley Jackson | September 11, 2016 |
| 3 | "The Business" | Andrew Disney | Andrew Disney and Bradley Jackson | September 18, 2016 |
| 4 | "The Big Sleep" | Andrew Disney | Andrew Disney and Bradley Jackson | September 25, 2016 |
| 5 | "The Party of the Century" | Andrew Disney | Andrew Disney and Bradley Jackson | October 9, 2016 |
| 6 | "The Moruga" | Andrew Disney | Andrew Disney and Bradley Jackson | October 16, 2016 |

== Season 2 ==
On May 20, 2020 Rooster Teeth Productions released season 2 as a cast table read to benefit charity during the Covid-19 pandemic.

== Reception ==
Crunch Time was released to limited but mostly positive reviews. Jude Dry of IndieWire gave it an "A" rating, writing, "With snappy dialogue and a premise to delight sci-fi newbies and die-hards alike, the twenty-minute episodes of 'Crunch Time' fly by as quickly as a good dream." In The Daily Dot, Audra Schroeder said the show was like a mix of It's Always Sunny in Philadelphia and Weird Science.
