= Najmieh Batmanglij =

Iranian-American chef

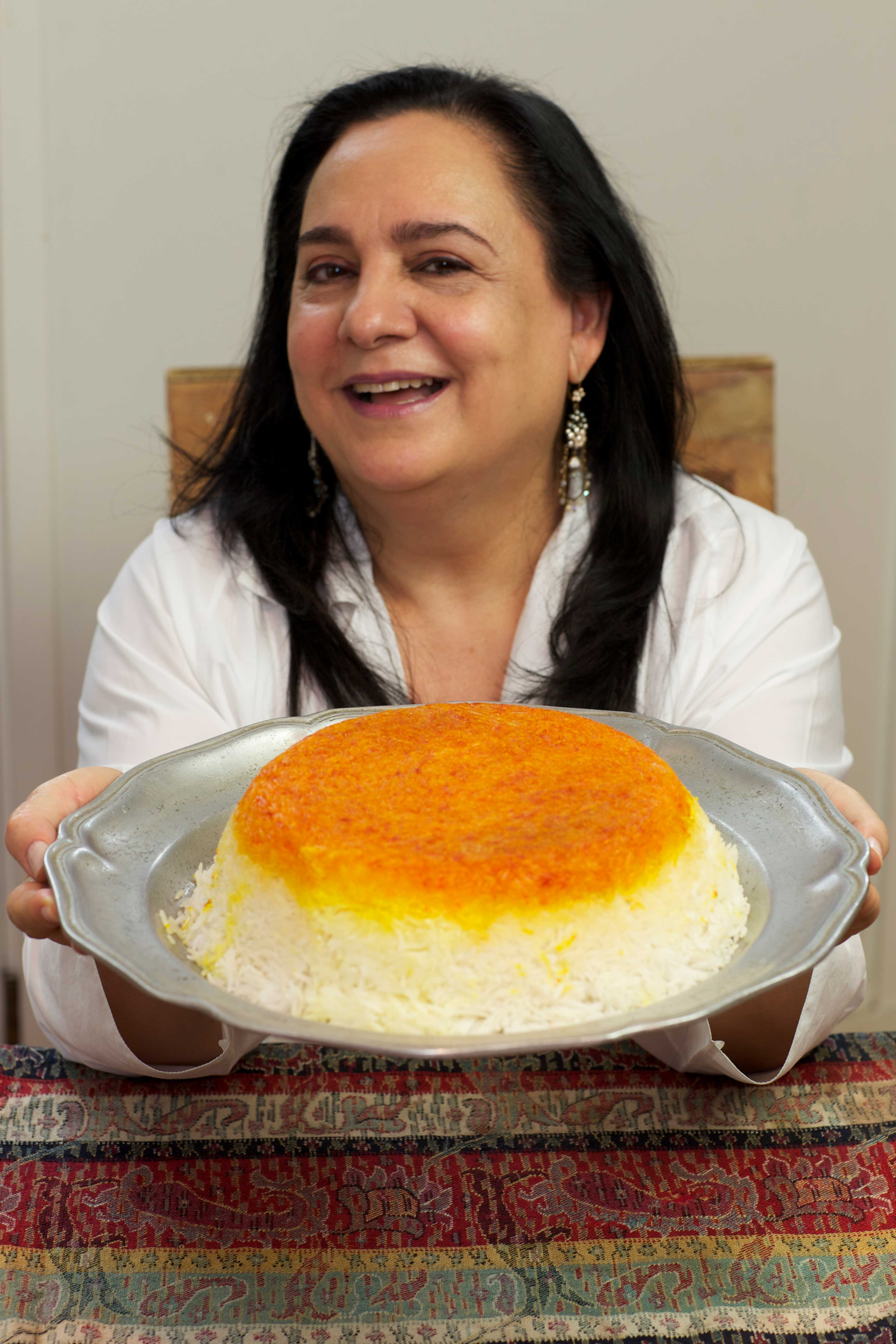
- Batmanglij with a dish of tahdig rice (2016)
- Born: Najmieh Khalili; 1947 (age 78–79); Tehran, Imperial Iran
- Occupations: chef, cookbook author, publisher
- Style: Persian cooking
- Children: Zal Batmanglij; Rostam Batmanglij
- Website: www.najmieh.com

Najmieh Khalili Batmanglij (Persian: نجمیه خلیلی باتمانقلیج, IPA: [nædʒmiːˈje bɒːtmɒːŋɢeˈliːdʒ]; born 1947) is an Iranian-American chef and cookbook author. Born in Tehran, she fled the Iranian Revolution in 1979, moving first to France, then the United States, building a career as a cookbook author as she went. Her first book, published in French, was called Ma Cuisine d’Iran (1984), followed by eight cookbooks in English, from Food of Life (1986) to Cooking in Iran (2018). The Washington Post hailed her in 2018 as "the grande dame of Iranian Cooking."

== Biography ==
Najmieh Khalili was born in 1947 in Tehran, Imperial Iran. She received her undergraduate and master's degrees in education in the United States. She returned to Iran after her education in America but was forced into exile in 1979, because of the Iranian Revolution. She and her husband fled to Vence, France as refugees, where she studied cooking and began translating her mother's recipes into French resulting in her first cookbook, Ma Cuisine d'Iran.

In the 1980s Batmanglij permanently relocated to Washington, DC where she wrote her celebrated book, Food of Life. After moving to the United States near the time of the Iran hostage crisis, she faced discrimination. As a result, she needed to publish her own work. Alongside her husband Mohammad, they started their own publishing house.

After the success of that book, Batmanglij went on to write five more cookbooks, including From Persia to Napa: Wine at the Persian Table, which won a Gourmand Cookbook Award. and Silk Road Cooking: A Vegetarian Journey, which The New York Times compared to reading "a good novel—once you start, it's hard to put down." Batmanglij has appeared on The Martha Stewart Show and also teaches Persian cooking. She is a member of Les Dames d'Escoffier, a society of professional women involved in the food, wine, and hospitality industries.

For many years she has taught at The Culinary Institute of America at Greystone in Napa Valley, California during the World of Flavors Conference.

A trailblazer in introducing Iranian cuisine to American readers, Batmanglij had few precursors, aside from Maideh Mazda, who wrote a short cookbook in 1960, and Nesta Ramazani, who wrote in 1982. With her cookbook for children, called Happy Nowruz, Batmanglij went even further by writing for members of the Iranian American diaspora, and by sharing not only recipes, but also insights about Nowruz customs and traditions.

== Honors and awards ==
On February 15, 2013, in his weekly article for The Guardian newspaper, Yotam Ottolenghi included a recipe that was inspired by a recipe in Food of Life, about which he said: "One of the most exciting cookbooks I've seen in a while, Food of Life: Ancient Persian And Modern Iranian Cooking And Ceremonies, by Najmieh Batmanglij–I highly recommend it to anyone with an interest in Iran's glorious food culture."

On April 6, 2016, she was the guest chef at First Lady Michelle Obama's White House Nowruz Celebration and Lunch. Julia Moskin of The New York Times wrote about her latest cookbook, "Magisterial ... An engrossing visual feast of modern Iran... Cooking in Iran is an essential new book" and selected it as one of "the 19 best cookbooks of Fall 2018".

Publishers Weekly called the cookbook, "A massive and thorough guide to Persian cuisine ... terrific, reverential, and accessible."

On November 5, 2018, The Washington Post published an article about her written by James Beard Award winning writer Mayukh Sen with the headline "Najmieh Batmanglij is the grande dame of Iranian cooking. It’s time you knew her name." On November 16, 2021, Taste Makers: Seven Immigrant Women Who Revolutionized Food in America by Mayukh Sen was published by W. W. Norton & Company; one of the featured immigrant women was Najmieh Batmanglij; on the same day, Hetty McKinnon wrote a review for The New York Times with the headline "Seven Immigrant Women Who Changed the Way Americans Eat."

== Personal life ==
She is married to book publisher, Mohammad Batmanglij. Her sons are Zal Batmanglij, a film director and screenwriter whose projects include Sound of My Voice, The East, and The OA; and Rostam Batmanglij, a record producer, musician, singer, songwriter and composer who was a founding member of the indie-pop band Vampire Weekend.

== See also ==
- List of Iranian women writers and poets

== Bibliography ==
- Batmanglij, Najmieh (1984). Ma Cuisine d'Iran. Paris: Jacques Grancher Publisher. ISBN 2733901117.
- Batmanglij, Najmieh (1986). Food of Life: Ancient Persian and Modern Iranian Cooking and Ceremonies (1 ed.). Washington D.C.: Mage Publishers. ISBN 9780934211000. OCLC 13395606.
- Batmanglij, Najmieh (1990). Food of Life (2 ed.). Washington D.C.: Mage Publishers. ISBN 9780934211277.
- Batmanglij, Najmieh (1993). New Food of Life (3 ed.). Washington D.C.: Mage Publishers. ISBN 9780934211345.
- Batmanglij, Najmieh (2009). Persian Cooking for a Healthy Kitchen. Mage Publishers, Incorporated. p. 200. ISBN 978-1-933-82326-3.
- Batmanglij, Najmieh (1999). A Taste of Persia: An Introduction to Persian Cooking. Mage Publishers. p. 339. ISBN 978-0-934-21154-3.
- Batmanglij, Najmieh (2000). Silk Road Cooking: A Vegetarian Journey (1 ed.). Washington D.C.: Mage Publishers, 1st Hardcover Ed. ISBN 9780934211635.
- Batmanglij, Najmieh (2002). Silk Road Cooking: A Vegetarian Journey (2 ed.). Washington D.C.: Mage Publishers, 1st Paperback Ed. ISBN 9780934211963.
- Batmanglij, Najmieh (2006). From Persia to Napa: Wine at the Persia Table. Washington D.C.: Mage Publishers. ISBN 9781933823003.
- Batmanglij, Najmieh (2008). Happy Nowruz: Cooking with Children to Celebrate the Persian New Year. Mage Publishers. ISBN 9781933823164.
- Batmanglij, Najmieh (1992). New Food of Life: Ancient Persian and Modern Iranian Cooking and Ceremonies. Mage Publishers. p. 442. ISBN 978-0-934-21134-5.
- Batmanglij, Najmieh (2015). Joon: Persian Cooking Made Simple. Washington D.C.: Mage Publishers. ISBN 9781933823720.
- Batmanglij, Najmieh (2018). Cooking in Iran: Regional Recipes and Kitchen Secrets. Mage Publishers, Incorporated. p. 728. ISBN 978-1-933-82395-9.
- Batmanglij, Najmieh (2020). Cooking in Iran: Regional Recipes and Kitchen Secrets (2 ed.). Washington D.C.: Mage Publishers. ISBN 9781949445077.
