= Freeganism =

Stance of limited participation in the food system and broader economy in protest

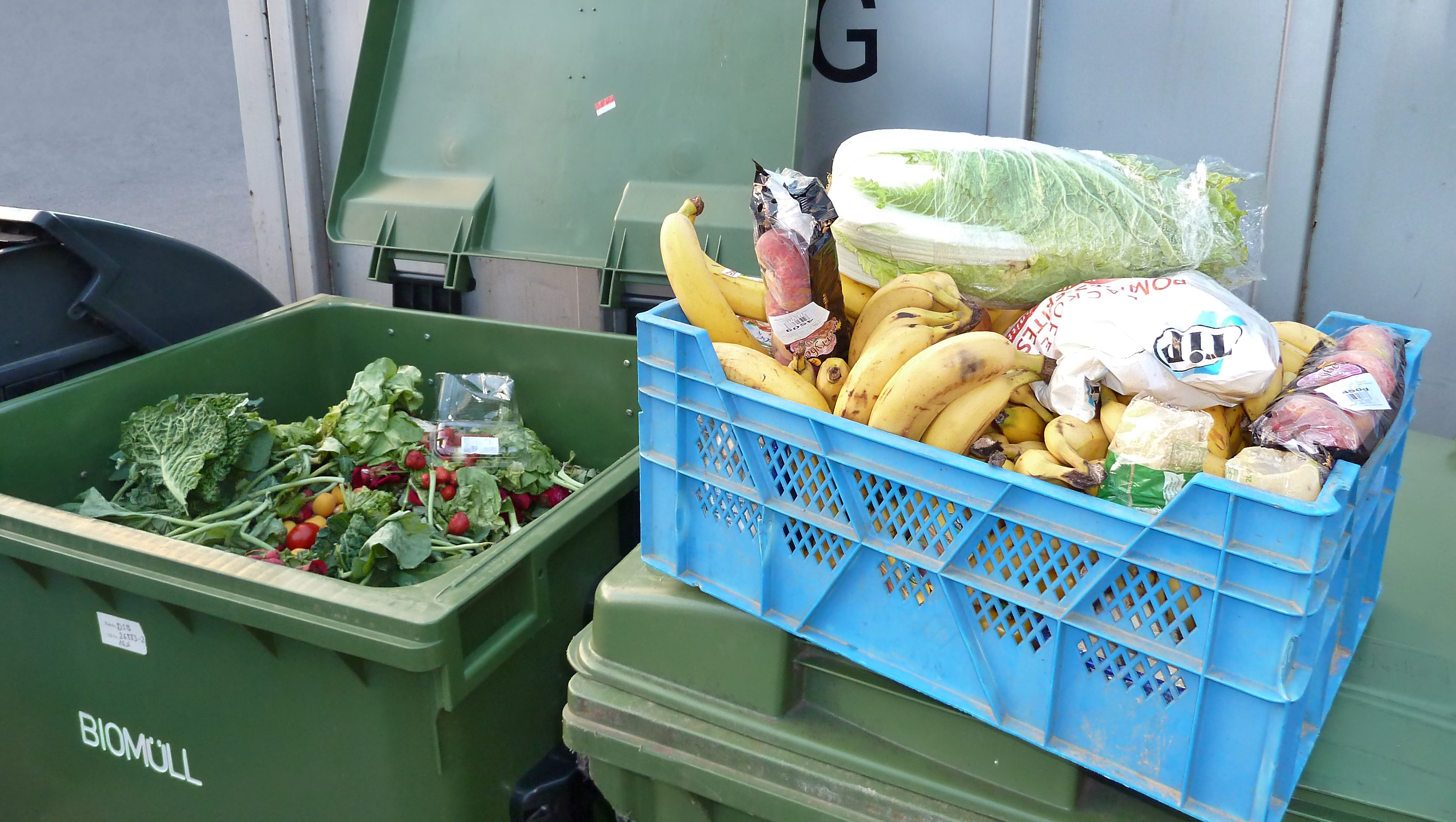
A box of vegetables and fruits recovered from the dumpsters of a hypermarket

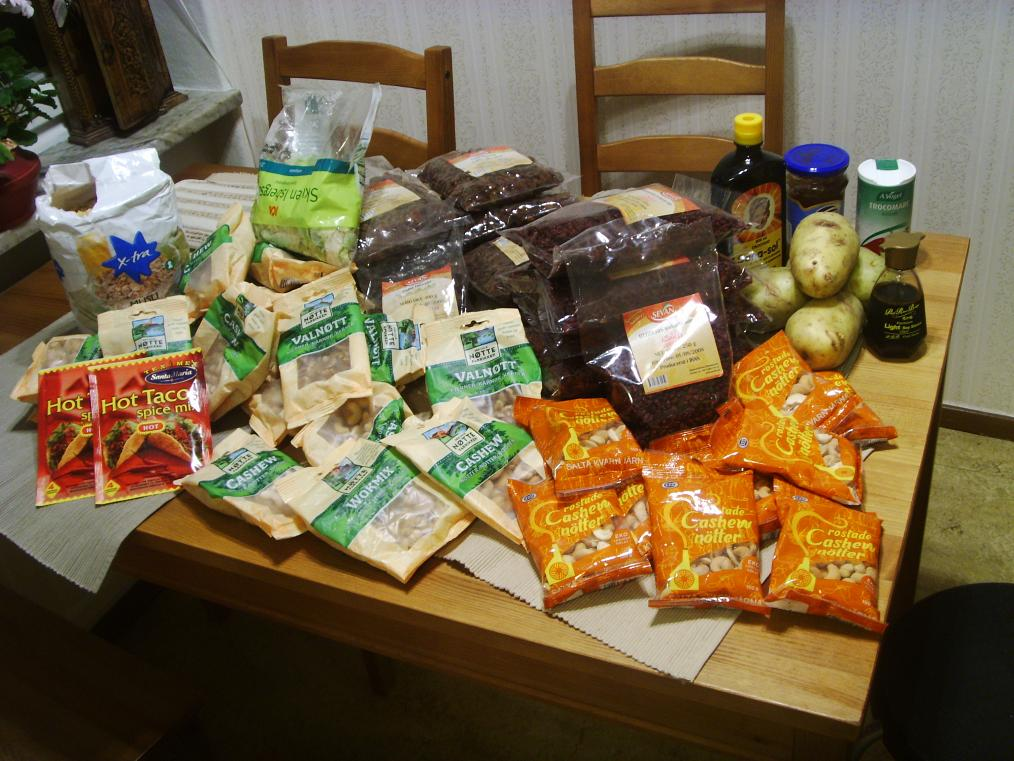
Urban foraged food in Stockholm, Sweden

Freeganism is an ideology of limited participation in the conventional economy and minimal consumption of resources, particularly through recovering wasted goods like food. The word "freegan" is a portmanteau of "free" and "vegan". While vegans avoid buying, consuming, using, and wearing animal products, freegans—at least in theory—avoid buying anything as an act of protest against the food system in general.

Freeganism is often presented as synonymous with "dumpster diving" for discarded food, although freegans are distinguished by their association with an anti-consumerist and anti-capitalist ideology and their engagement in a wider range of alternative living strategies, such as voluntary unemployment, squatting in abandoned buildings, and "guerrilla gardening" in unoccupied city parks.

== History ==
Hippies in Lincoln Park, Chicago, attending a Yippie organized event, approximately five miles north of the 1968 Democratic National Convention center. The band MC5 can be seen playing. A 'FREE STORE' is in the park.

Freegans' goal of reduced participation in capitalism and tactics of recovering wasted goods share elements with the Diggers, an anarchist street theater group based in Haight-Ashbury in San Francisco in the 1960s that organized free housing and clinics and gave away rescued food. The word "freegan" itself was allegedly invented in 1994 by Keith McHenry, the co-founder of Food Not Bombs—an anarchist group that distributes free vegetarian meals as a protest against militarism and as a way of providing "solidarity not charity"—to refer to non-vegans who never pay for animal products. McHenry's account is consistent with other published accounts of freeganism that show the word as beginning to be used in the mid-1990s by participants in the antiglobalization and radical environmental movements.

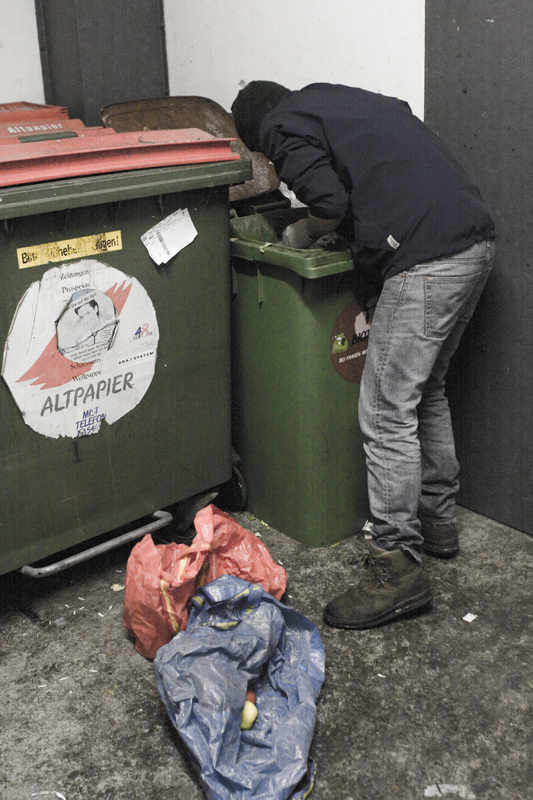
Freegan while dumpster diving

The pamphlet "Why Freegan?"—written by former Against Me! drummer Warren Oakes in Gainesville, Florida, in 1999—defines freeganism as "an anti-consumeristic ethic about eating" and goes on to describe practices including dumpster diving, plate scraping, wild foraging, gardening, theft, employee scams, and barter as alternatives to paying for food. The pamphlet also expanded the activities associated with "freeganism" with a long section on non-alimentary practices, including conserving water, pre-cycling, reusing goods, and using solar energy. More than just a set of behaviors, though, the pamphlet presents freeganism as having an overarching political goal: an "ultimate boycott" of "all the corporations, all the stores, all the pesticides, all the land and resources wasted, the capitalist system, the all-oppressive dollar, the wage slavery, the whole burrito" in favor of "liv[ing] a full satisfying life...while treading lightly on the earth". The first organized group of self-described "freegans" formed in 2003 as an offshoot of the Wetlands Preserve nightclub and associated Activism Center in New York City. According to the group freegan.info, "After years of trying to boycott products from unethical corporations responsible for human rights violations, environmental destruction, and animal abuse, many of us found that no matter what we bought we ended up supporting something deplorable. We came to realize that the problem isn't just a few bad corporations but the entire system itself." From 2005, freegan.info organized regular events including sewing and bicycle workshops, wild food foraging expeditions, and "trash tours"—public dumpster dives open to the public and to media.

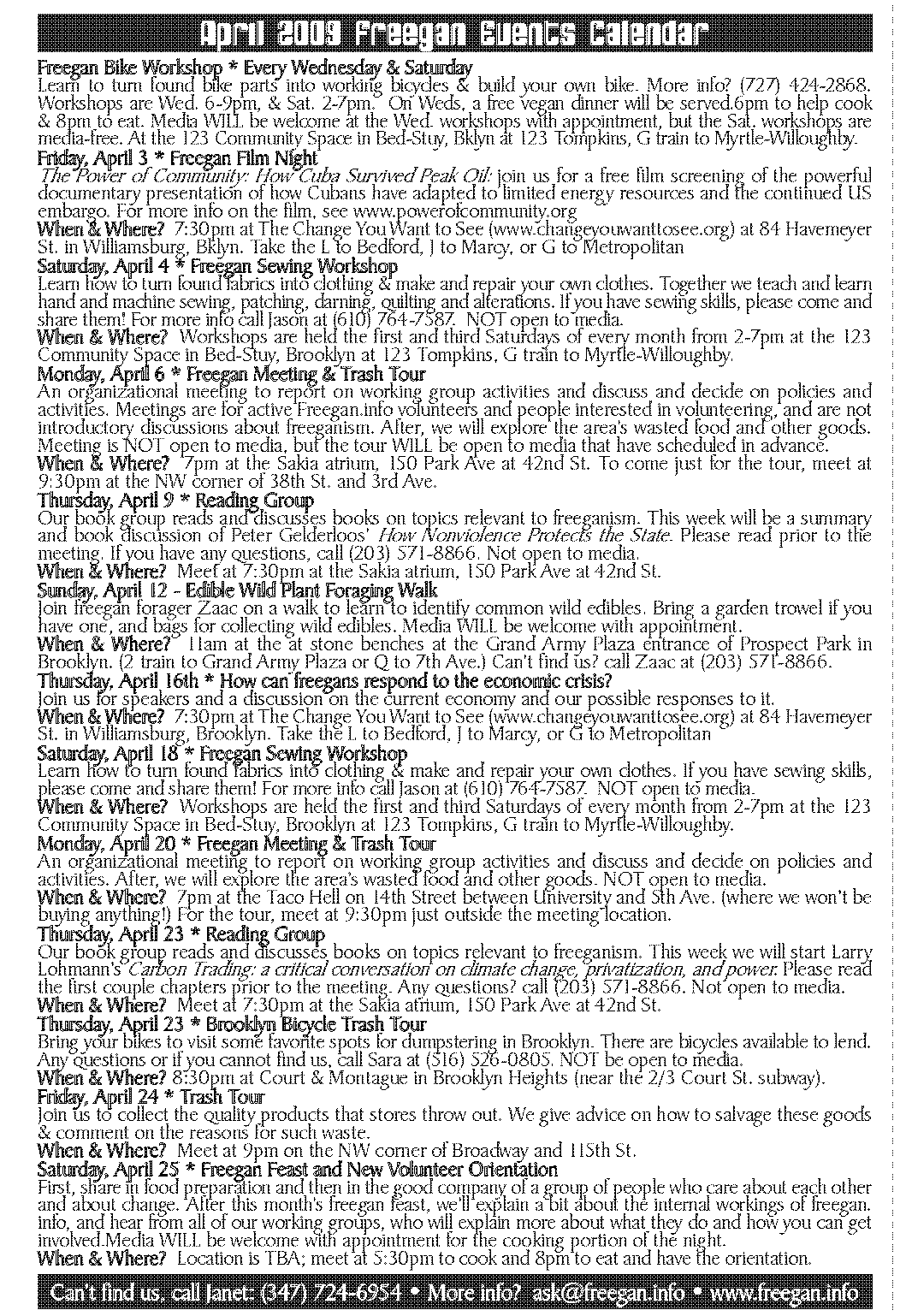
A freegan.info event calendar from 2008

== Motivations and ideology ==
Studies usually find that most people who participate in practices associated with freeganism, such as dumpster diving for food, do so for economic reasons. Freegans are usually distinguished as being a subset of this population which has an ideological or political motivation for recovering waste or avoiding consumption, although some freegans also say that they do so for amusement, to acquire free goods, or out of religious conviction. Anthropologist Loretta Lou has demonstrated how freeganism is closely related to notions of freedom, especially "ethical freedom", among some freegan practitioners in Asia.

=== Anarchism and anti-capitalism ===
Freeganism's initial practitioners and forerunners like Food Not Bombs were explicitly anti-capitalist, arguing that capitalism is responsible for excessive consumption, the abuse of human laborers and non-human animals, and the waste of resources. Freegans' approach to anti-capitalism is broadly anarchist in orientation: rather than seeking to seize state power, freegans claim to be engaged in "prefigurative politics", using wasted resources to build a new society "in the shell of the old" based on values of "community, generosity, social concern, freedom, cooperation, and sharing". Freegan practices in theory reject the commoditization of basic necessities, the imperative of economic growth, and an economy based on money exchange rather than free gifting or sharing. Freegan organizations also often use consensus-based decision-making, popularized by the anti-globalization movement and later visible in anarchist-inspired mobilizations like Occupy Wall Street.

=== Veganism and food waste ===
The word "freegan" originated as a play on the label "veganism" and research on freegan.info in New York found that most participants were vegetarian or vegan prior to becoming freegan. In many cases, though, freegans critique vegans by arguing that vegans ignore the environmental and labor impacts of the products they buy and corporate ownership of many vegan product lines.

Freegans' rejection of veganism is often tied to their discovery of food waste, estimated as up to 40% of the food supply in the United States and other Western countries. For many, statistics about the ecological impacts of food waste—up to 12% of global cropland and 23% of global freshwater goes to produce food which is never consumed—serve as justification for a complete rejection of the capitalist food system. Moreover, the presence of food in supermarket dumpsters shows, according to some freegans, that the vegan theory of social change is flawed, because markets do not efficiently translate consumer preferences into changes in production.

=== Back-to-nature ===
Some freegans associate themselves with "back-to-the-landers" or "anarcho-primitivism", the latter of which asserts that human beings should reject not only capitalism but civilization itself. With some exceptions, though, freeganism is a largely urban or suburban phenomenon. Some research suggests that freegans overcome this apparent contradiction by attempting to re-naturalize the city, treating urban waste as a "natural" resource and approach dumpster diving as a practice analogous to hunting or gathering.

== Practices ==
=== Urban foraging ===
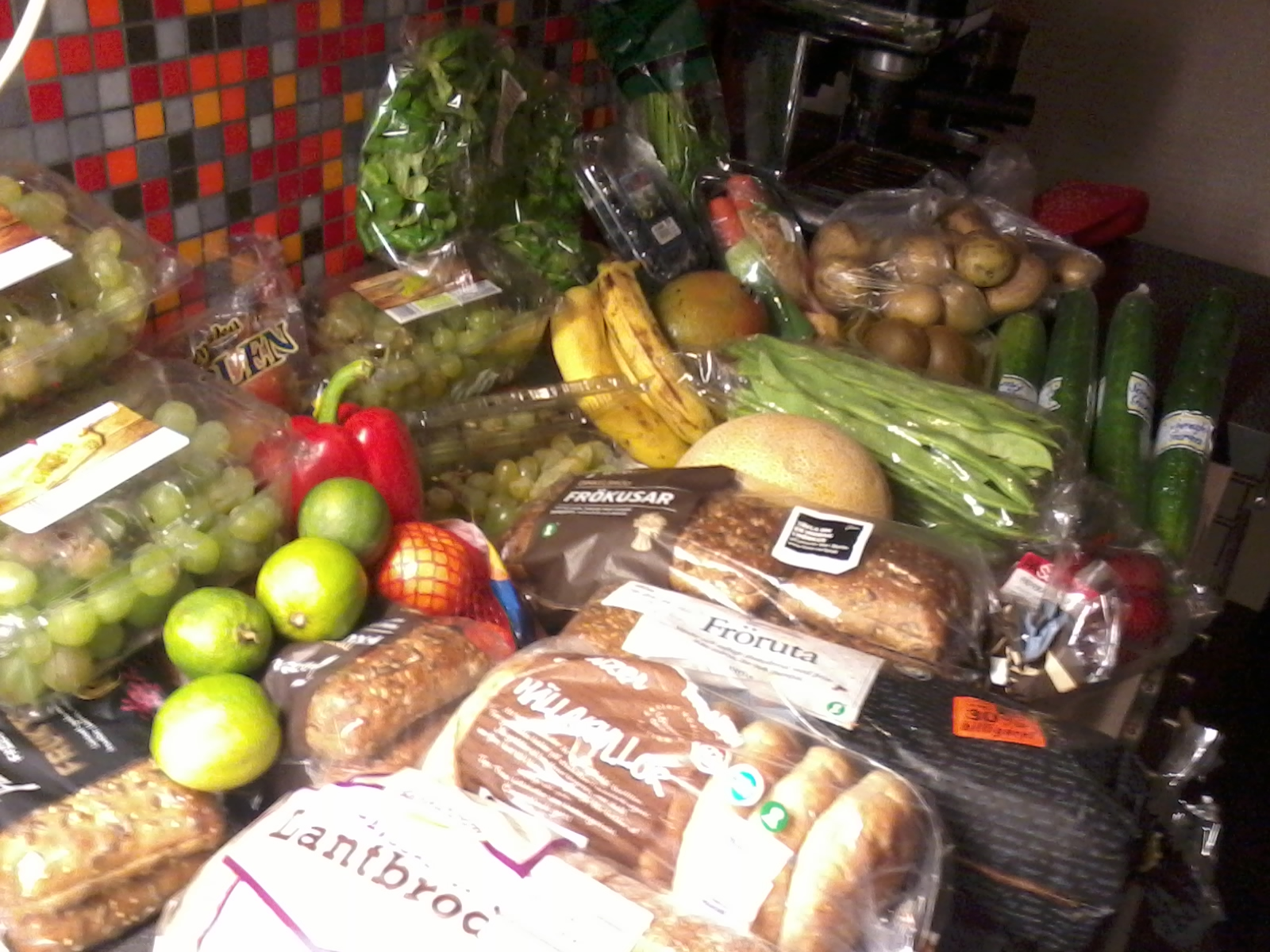
Food collected from a dumpster in Linköping, Sweden

Freegans are best known for recovering discarded food from commercial establishments, a practice known as "dumpster diving" or "urban foraging" in North America, "skipping", "bin raiding", or "skipitarianism" in the UK, "skip dipping" in Australia, "containern" in Germany, or "doing the duck" in New Zealand. Freegan diets are thus made possible by the range of practices that produce commercial food waste that is nonetheless still edible, such as conservative sell-by dates, the deliberate overstocking of certain perishable products (like baked goods), or aesthetic criteria for fruits and vegetables. However, dumpster diving is not limited to rummaging for food; freegans report recovering clothing, books, appliances, bicycles, and furniture from commercial dumpsters as well.

Although some freegans are reluctant to share their sites and strategies for "urban foraging", others—like those in freegan.info—have organized public events to raise awareness of food waste and recruit other practitioners. These events attracted significant media coverage, particularly between 2005 and 2009, from outlets such as The New York Times, Oprah, and MSNBC.

=== Wild foraging and urban gardens ===
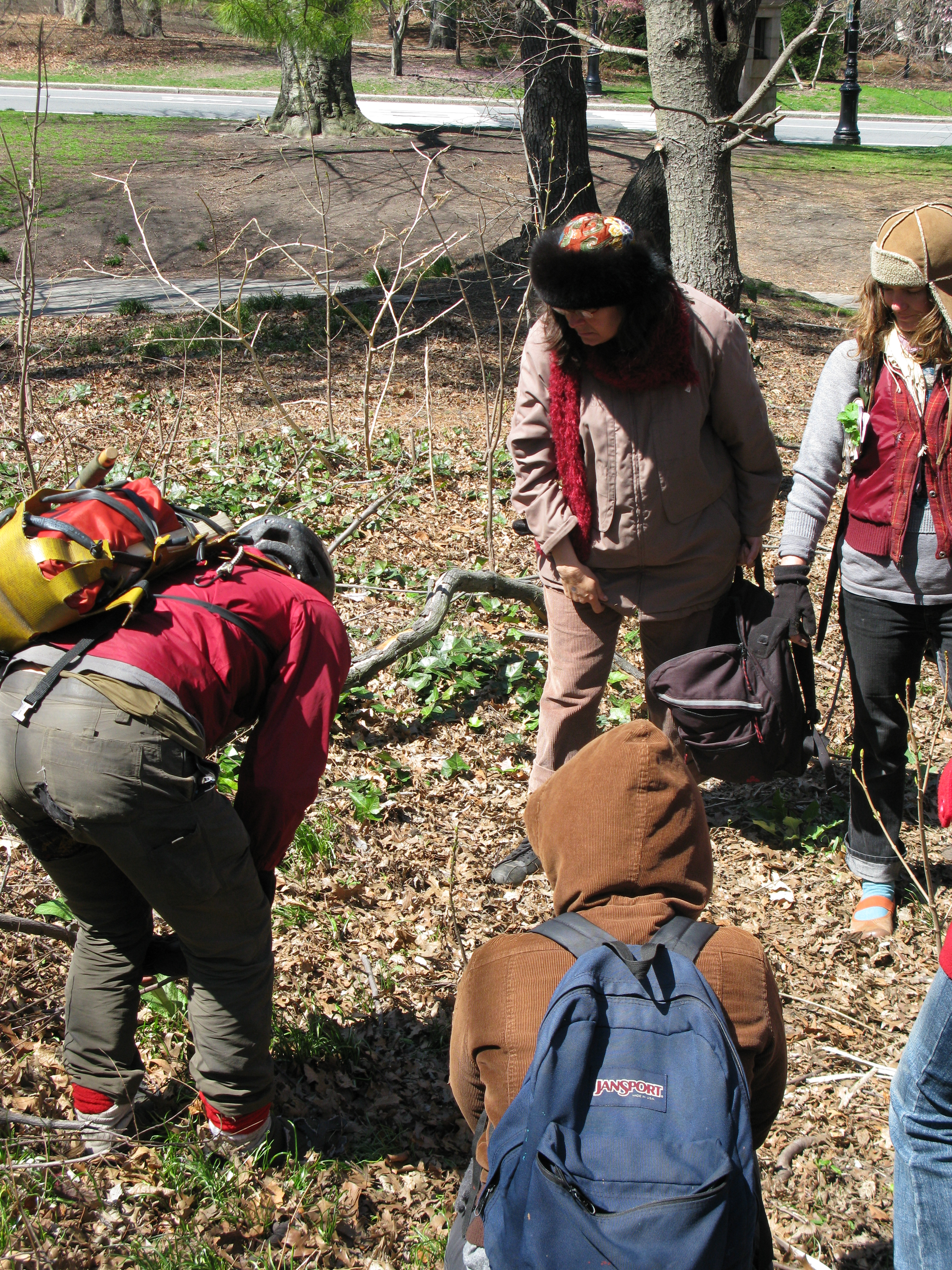
Freegans foraging for wild food in a New York City park

Instead of buying conventionally grown foods, wild foragers find and harvest food and medicinal plants growing in their own communities. Some freegans participate in "guerrilla" or "community" gardens, with the stated aim of rebuilding community and reclaiming the capacity to grow one's own food. In order to fertilize those guerrilla gardens, food obtained from dumpster diving is sometimes also reused, and some use vermiculture instead of ordinary composting techniques in order to keep the required infrastructure small and adapted to urban areas. Some rural freegans are also "homesteaders" who grow their own food and employ alternative energy sources to provide energy for their homesteads, occasionally living "off the grid" entirely.

=== Sharing ===
"Sharing" is also presented as a common freegan practice, associated with the anarchist idea of a "gift economy". For example, Food Not Bombs recovers food that would otherwise go to waste to serve warm meals on the street to anyone who wants them. Really, Really Free Markets are free social events in which freegans can share goods instead of discarding them, share skills, give presents and eat food. A free store is a temporary market where people exchange goods and services outside of a money-based economy. In New York City, freegan.info often distributes recovered food items for free in an ad-hoc manner after trash tours.

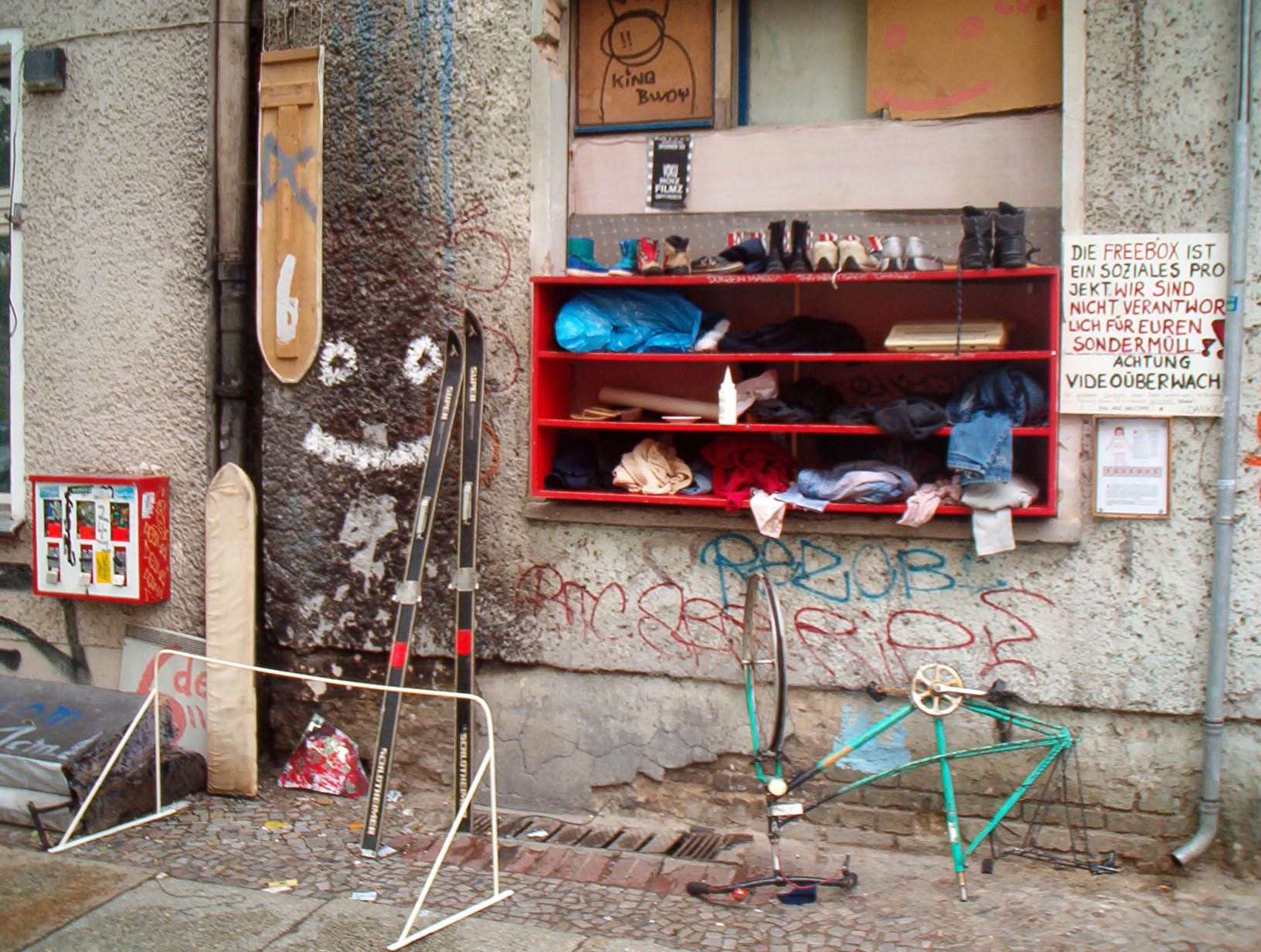
A Freebox in Berlin, Germany, 2005, serving as a distribution center for free donated materials

Freegans also advocate sharing travel resources. Carpools and hitchhiking reduce, but do not eliminate, use of cars. Community bicycle programs and collectives facilitate community sharing of bicycles, restore found and broken bikes, and teach people how to do their own bicycle repairs. In the process, they aim to build a culture of skill and resource sharing, reuse wasted bikes and bike parts, and create greater access to green transport.

=== Squatting ===
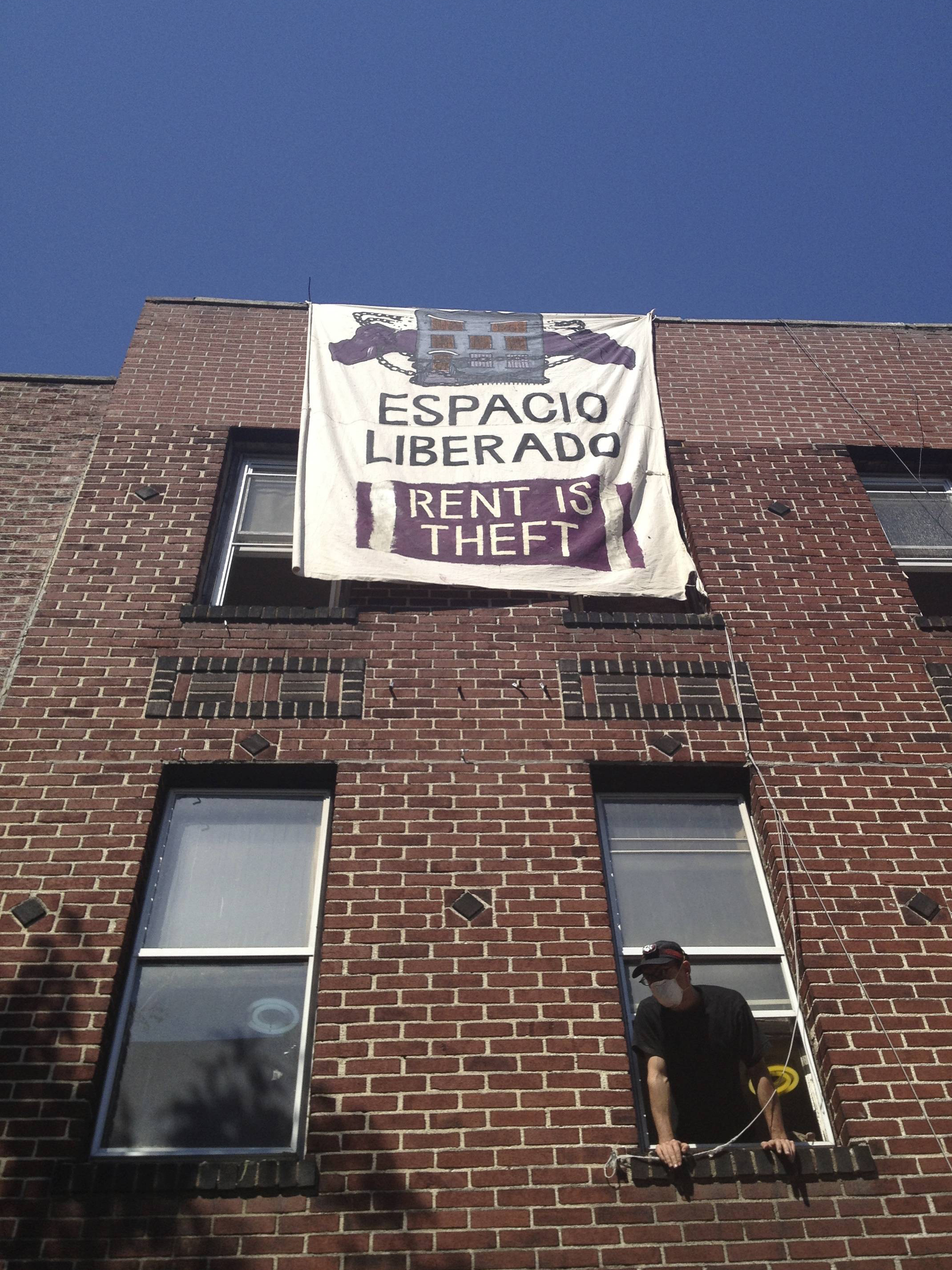
A freegan in a squatted building in New York City

Just as freegans argue food waste should be recovered and redistributed, many argue that unoccupied buildings are a form of "waste" to be reclaimed. Squatting was widespread in Western Europe as well as parts of the United States in the 1980s and 1990s, and activists used squatted buildings not only for housing but also to create community centers, pirate radio stations, or free schools. A widespread crackdown by municipalities closed many squats and legalized the remainder in the 1990s—the moment when freeganism was emerging—and so it is thus difficult to know how many people are involved in this activity. While research with freegans consistently shows that they endorse squatting, in practice, freegan living situations vary, ranging from trading work for rent to traditional home ownership.

=== Working less ===
Working less is another component of freeganism. Freegans oppose the notion of working for the sole purpose of accumulating material items. They argue that their need to work is reduced by only purchasing the basic necessities and acquiring the remainder for free from the garbage. According to freegans, not working frees up additional time for political action while avoiding tasks they see as sacrificing valuable time to "take orders from someone else, stress, boredom, monotony, and in many cases risks to physical and psychological well-being". As with squatting, however, the degree of concordance between freegan ideology and practices is variable. In surveys, self-described freegans vary from reporting working only irregularly, working consistently in social justice organizations, and being employed in more conventional, "capitalist" occupations.

== Responses and criticism ==
=== Sanitation and stigma ===
Contact with waste is seen as a taboo and socially unacceptable in most developed countries, and freegans are often associated with stigmatized and racialized groups like the homeless or even compared to scavenging "pest" animals like raccoons. Some public health officials, like those in New York City, have explicitly discouraged dumpster diving for sanitation reasons and media coverage occasionally focuses on the "ick" factor of dumpster diving while (explicitly or implicitly) ignoring its political content. This discourse has been deployed more broadly to discredit anarchist movements by claiming they are unhygienic and thus dangerous. While some freegans argue that dumpster dived food is safe—noting it is usually thrown out because it cannot be profitably sold, not because it is no longer edible—others embrace the "dirtiness" of recovered food as a symbolic rejection of capitalist norms. The group freegan.info has made the disgust attached to wasted food part of its messaging, arguing that social disapprobation should instead fall on those who throw out food, rather than those who recover it.

=== Parasitism ===
Freeganism has also been critiqued both by other radical movements and by mainstream commentators for the fact that its signature practice—dumpster diving—depends on the capitalist food system that freegans claim to be rejecting. A typical response is that freegan practices are not limited to dumpster diving, but include also actions like guerilla gardening, wild food foraging, or sewing or bike repair "skill shares" that are more fully autonomous from the conventional economy.

=== Racial and class composition ===
Although activities like dumpster diving or gleaning are traditionally seen as subsistence strategies for the poor, most research on freegans finds that individuals come from middle-class and upper-class backgrounds and have high levels of education (even if their present lifestyles make them low-income). Freeganism has also been described as racially exclusive, because freeganism's voluntary association of waste would seem to confirm a "globally ubiquitous racial construction" that people of color are dirty and polluted. As one freegan of color wrote, "I am extremely embarrassed for people to see me diving, because I can tell that I'm not just me, I'm also a representation of black people in general...I got harassed by security several times while diving on my own campus, until my white friends pop their heads out of the dumpsters." In contrast, the portrait of the gender balance of freeganism is more mixed, with some accounts saying groups are majority men and others majority women.

=== Legality and commercial responses ===
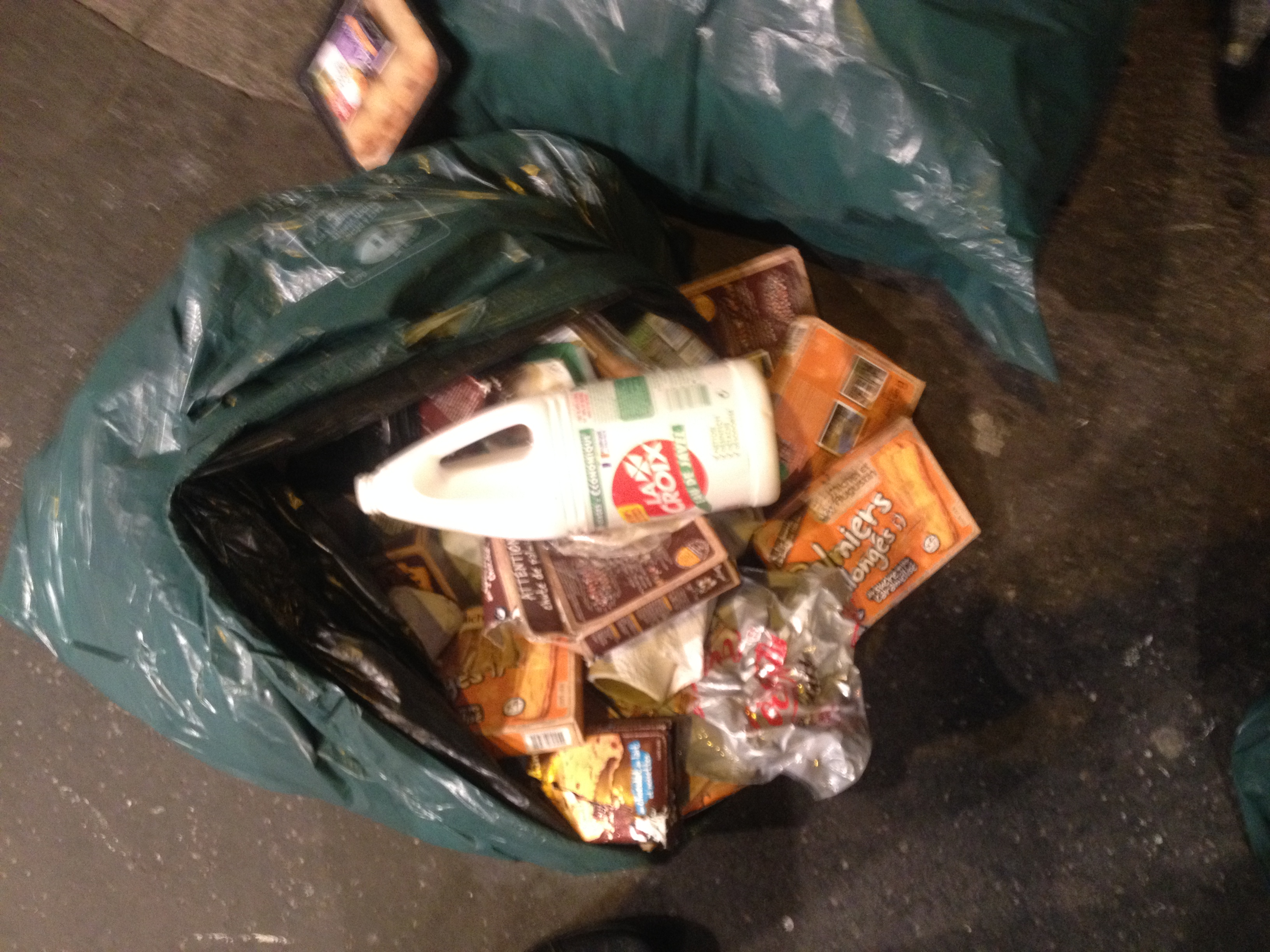
Bleach on discarded food in Paris, France

The legality of freegan practices of reclaiming wasted food, space, or buildings varies depending on local laws around property, trespassing, and waste removal. In some places, like New York City, freegans dumpster dive publicly; in other locations, urban foraging is a secretive activity. In recent years, there have been arrests of people dumpster diving for political reasons in the United Kingdom, Belgium, and France, although in most locations charges have eventually been dropped. These actions could be seen as part of a broader criminalization of acts of survival—like sleeping in public places, sharing food without a permit, or recovering aluminum cans to re-sell—that has affected freegans as well as affiliated groups like Food Not Bombs and the homeless. Freegans report that stores have responded to waste recovery as well, including deliberately destroying products prior to disposing of them, locking dumpsters, or pouring bleach on food to make it inedible. In France, a new national law bans the practice of destroying food in this way.

== Impacts ==
Media coverage of freeganism in the United States peaked around the 2008 financial crisis and dropped off subsequently. More recently, freeganism has been discussed in the context of increasing public interest in food waste. Tristram Stuart, a prominent food waste campaigner and founder of the organization "Feedback" claims that media attention to freeganism was crucial in attracting attention to the problem. Other analyses of the origins of contemporary public policy initiatives around food waste have also concluded that freeganism contributed to new initiatives, like the French law on food waste or the U.S. food waste reduction challenge.

== In popular culture ==
The 2013 film The East was based on Freeganism and related practices such as Anarchist Communalism. Director Zal Batmanglij and star Brit Marling co-wrote the film and the script was largely based on their experiences practicing Freeganism in the summer of 2009.

== See also ==
- Hunter-gatherer
- Pagpag
