= The OA =

2016 American mystery drama television series

- Poster for the first season
- Genre: Mystery; Drama; Science fiction; Supernatural; Fantasy
- Created by: Brit Marling; Zal Batmanglij
- Directed by: Zal Batmanglij; Andrew Haigh; Anna Rose Holmer
- Starring: Brit Marling; Emory Cohen; Scott Wilson; Phyllis Smith; Alice Krige; Patrick Gibson; Brendan Meyer; Brandon Perea; Ian Alexander; Jason Isaacs; Sharon Van Etten; Paz Vega; Will Brill; Chloë Levine; Kingsley Ben-Adir
- Theme music composer: Rostam Batmanglij
- Composers: Rostam Batmanglij; Danny Bensi; Saunder Jurriaans; Jay Wadley; John Rossiter; Aaron M. Olson; Keegan DeWitt
- Country of origin: United States
- Original language: English
- No. of seasons: 2
- No. of episodes: 16

Production
- Executive producers: Brit Marling; Zal Batmanglij; Brad Pitt; Dede Gardner; Jeremy Kleiner; Sarah Esberg; Michael Sugar; Alison Engel; Blair Fetter; Nina Wolarsky
- Producers: Jill Footlick; Ashley Zalta; Aida Rodgers
- Production locations: New York City; Orange County, New York; Groton, Connecticut
- Cinematography: Lol Crawley; Steven Meizler; Magnus Nordenhof Jønck
- Editors: Jonathan Alberts; Geraud Brisson; Matthew Hannam; Lisa Lassek; Andrew Weisblum; Alex O'Flinn; Neil Meiklejohn; Luke Ciarrocchi; Blake Holland; Saela Davis
- Running time: 31–71 minutes
- Production companies: Plan B Entertainment; Anonymous Content

Original release
- Network: Netflix
- Release: December 16, 2016 – March 22, 2019

The OA is an American mystery drama television series with science fiction, supernatural, and fantasy elements. The OA debuted on Netflix on December 16, 2016. Created and executive-produced by Brit Marling and Zal Batmanglij, the series is their third collaboration. The series consists of two seasons of eight episodes each, nearly all directed by Batmanglij, and is produced by Plan B Entertainment and Anonymous Content. In the series, Marling stars as a young woman named Prairie Johnson, who has resurfaced after having been missing for seven years. Prairie now calls herself "the OA" and can see, despite having been blind before her disappearance.

On February 8, 2017, Netflix renewed the series for a second season, dubbed "Part II", that was released on March 22, 2019. Although The OA was planned by its creators to be a five-part story told in five seasons, on August 5, 2019, Netflix canceled the series after two seasons, leaving the show with a cliffhanger ending. The OA received generally favorable critical reception, averaging 77% for Part I and 92% for Part II on Rotten Tomatoes. It has been included in the "best of ..." lists of many entertainment publications.

== Synopsis ==
=== Part I ===
The series follows Prairie Johnson, an adopted young woman who resurfaces after having been missing for seven years. Upon her return, Prairie calls herself "the OA" (for "original angel"), has scars on her back, and can see, despite having been blind when she disappeared. The OA refuses to tell the FBI and her adoptive parents where she has been and how her eyesight was restored, and instead quickly assembles a team of five locals (four high school students and a teacher) to whom she reveals that information, also explaining her life story. Finally, she asks for their help to save the other missing people whom she claims she can rescue by opening a portal to another dimension.

=== Part II ===
The second season follows the OA as she traverses to another dimension and ends up in San Francisco to continue her search for her former captor, Hap, and her fellow captives. Prairie crosses paths with private eye Karim Washington and assists in his investigation of the surreal disappearance of a missing girl that involves an abandoned house with a supernatural history and an online puzzle game. Meanwhile, in the original dimension, a series of unfortunate events propels the OA's five companions to embark on a road trip across America to assist the OA on her journey.

== Cast ==
The following actors appear in the series:

=== Main ===
- Brit Marling as Prairie Johnson / the OA / Nina Azarova
- Emory Cohen as Homer Roberts
- Scott Wilson as Abel Johnson, Prairie's adoptive father (season 1, guest season 2)
- Phyllis Smith as Betty "BBA" Broderick-Allen
- Alice Krige as Nancy Johnson, Prairie's adoptive mother (season 1, guest season 2)
- Patrick Gibson as Steve Winchell
- Brendan Meyer as Jesse Mills
- Brandon Perea as Alfonso "French" Sosa
- Ian Alexander as Buck Vu and Michelle Vu (season 2)
- Jason Isaacs as Hunter Aloysius "Hap" Percy / Dr. Percy
- Kingsley Ben-Adir as Karim Washington (season 2)
- Will Brill as Scott Brown (season 2, recurring season 1)
- Sharon Van Etten as Rachel DeGrasso (season 2, recurring season 1)
- Paz Vega as Renata Duarte (season 2, recurring season 1)
- Chloë Levine as Angie (season 2, recurring season 1)

=== Guest ===
- Hiam Abbass as Khatun (season 1)
- Zoey Todorovsky as Nina Azarova, a young Prairie Johnson
- Marcus Choi as Mr. Vu
- Robert Eli as Ellis Gilchrist, a high school principal (season 1)
- Nikolai Nikolaeff as Roman Azarov, Nina's father
- Sean Grandillo as Miles Brekov (season 1)
- Rosalind Chao as Patricia Knoller, a Chicago Tribune journalist (season 1)
- Zachary Gemino as Carlos Sosa, Alfonso's brother
- Harry Hains as Noah
- Riz Ahmed as Elias Rahim, an FBI trauma counselor
- Robert Morgan as Stan Markham, a sheriff (season 1)
- Michael Cumpsty as Leon Citro (season 1)
- Bria Vinaite as Darmi (season 2)
- Zendaya as Fola Uzaki (season 2)
- Zoë Chao as Mo (season 2)
- Irène Jacob as Élodie (season 2)
- Eijiro Ozaki as Azrael / Old Night, a giant octopus (voice) (season 2)
- Vincent Kartheiser as Pierre Ruskin (season 2)
- Liz Carr as Marlow Rhodes (season 2)
- Melora Walters as Melody, who accompanies OA to the clinic in the episode "Angel of Death"

== Episodes ==
Part	Episodes	Originally released
1	8	December 16, 2016
2	8	March 22, 2019

=== Part I (2016) ===
No. overall	No. in part	Title	Directed by	Written by	Original release date
1	1	"Chapter 1: Homecoming"	Zal Batmanglij	Brit Marling & Zal Batmanglij	December 16, 2016
After disappearing seven years ago, Prairie Johnson returns to her parents, Nancy and Abel. Prairie disappeared blind, but now she can see, and insists that her name is "the OA". She does not reveal how she regained her eyesight, nor where she has been for the past seven years, although she makes vague allusions to being held hostage with others. OA tells Steve, a neighborhood bully, that she will save him from being sent to boot camp in Asheville, if he presents her with four other strong people. That night, OA meets Steve in an abandoned house with three other boys from his school, "French", Buck, and Jesse, along with their teacher, Betty Broderick-Allen ("BBA"). She tells them that she was born in Russia as Nina Azarova, the daughter of a powerful oligarch. One day, following a premonition she had, the mafia knocked the bus of the oligarchs' children into a river. Nina had a near-death experience (NDE), where a supernatural entity named Khatun gave her the choice of returning to life. Nina came back blind after Khatun told her she would take her sight to protect her from the horrible things lying ahead.
2	2	"Chapter 2: New Colossus"	Zal Batmanglij	Melanie Marnich	December 16, 2016
Continuing her story, OA says that her father sent her to a boarding school for blind children in America to protect her. However, her father died, and she was sent to live with her aunt who ran an illegal adoption service. Nancy and Abel adopted her and named her Prairie. For the next several years, Prairie had dreams and premonitions, for which her parents medicated her. In them, her father waited for her by the Statue of Liberty. She ran away on her 21st birthday to see him, but he did not appear. Instead, she met a scientist named "Hap". She ends her story there for that night, and the teenagers begin to investigate whether she is telling the truth. French considers not going again when he gets a scholarship and wishes to focus on that, but Buck convinces him to come. The next night, she tells them that Hap was studying people that had NDEs, like she did. Prairie agreed to let Hap study her and flew on his private plane to his house, where he trapped her in a glass cage in his basement, with the other test subjects he had tricked over the years.
3	3	"Chapter 3: Champion"	Zal Batmanglij	Brit Marling & Dominic Orlando	December 16, 2016
In the present, a journalist approaches Prairie's mother, asking if she can write a book about their story. In the flashback, Prairie gets to know Homer, Scott and Rachel, the other three captives. Prairie makes Hap a sandwich, and he takes her on as a cook. He regularly pumps gas to their cages as part of an experiment, but the four cannot figure what that is, as the gas makes them pass out. BBA defends Steve from being sent to Asheville, convincing his parents to put him in special education instead. Prairie makes soup for Hap, who experiences anaphylactic shock when he eats it. He asks her to get an EpiPen from the bathroom, but there she discovers the dead body of a girl "August". The captives try to send a letter for help, but lose it. Prairie asks Hap about August but becomes angry, pushes him down the stairs, and flees. She makes it as far as a cliff, and gets hit in the head by Hap's rifle butt.
4	4	"Chapter 4: Away"	Zal Batmanglij	Ruby Rae Spiegel	December 16, 2016
Prairie again meets Khatun in NDE. She is offered the choice of reuniting with her father but she chooses to return to help the others. Khatun, who shows she has a bird wing, offers Prairie to swallow a bird which will show her a way of traveling unknown to humans. She tells Prairie that five of them must work together to avert a great evil and that Prairie is "the original". Hap returns Prairie to her cage, and she tells the others that she can see, that they are all angels, and that their way out is by figuring out Hap's experiment. In the present, BBA learns her brother Theo left her $50,000 in his will. OA meets an FBI counselor, Elias, who suggests to her that she focus on healing herself. In her story, Prairie and Rachel decide to suck Hap's scopolamine-like gas so that Homer experiences the experiment awake. Hap is revealed to be drowning them in water and recording the soundscape of their NDEs. It takes Homer four years, but he experiences an NDE awake, in which he manages to swallow a sea anemone. Prairie contemplates the possibility that she has a truer self who answers to something sounding like "Away" or "Oh-A".
5	5	"Chapter 5: Paradise"	Zal Batmanglij	Brit Marling & Zal Batmanglij	December 16, 2016
OA (having abandoned the name Prairie) and Homer perform the two choreographic movements they got from their NDEs. Hap forces Homer to seduce an NDE survivor in Cuba named Renata, to kidnap her. Homer ends up sleeping with her, which destroys the morale of the team and hurts OA. With Renata now locked up back at Hap's, it is Scott's turn for the experiment. Scott begs Hap to spare him because he is too sick to survive another NDE and reveals OA can see as well as her ideas about angels and how to escape. Hap proceeds with the experiment, and Scott dies. Hap takes his body back to his cage, telling OA it is her fault. OA and Homer do their movements for hours, while facing each other with Scott in the middle. Unexpectedly, Scott returns to life and tells them they were right; if at least five people perform the movements, a door to another dimension opens. He has been given the third of five. Hap runs downstairs in shock that Scott is alive. In present day, OA tells the others the reason she gathered them is to teach them the movements so that she may travel to another dimension and rescue the others.
6	6	"Chapter 6: Forking Paths"	Zal Batmanglij	Melanie Marnich	December 16, 2016
In the following three years, Renata gets the fourth movement, OA and Homer scar themselves with depictions of the movements so that they do not forget them, and Hap is watching closely and learning their movements as well. Hap visits his former mentor, Leon, in a morgue, in which Leon also runs similar experiments. Leon tells Hap he is very close to proving the existence of an afterlife, but Hap tells him he actually believes there are multiple dimensions and that his subjects have the means to make traveling between them possible. He also thinks he knows where their NDEs take place, and he intends to go see it with his own eyes. Leon pulls a gun on Hap demanding he reveals his breakthroughs. They fight, and Hap kills him. Hap leaves the hospital and tells the staff to call the police to rescue Leon's subjects. Later, he asks OA to leave with him, make money using the first two healing movements, and run experiments on their own, but she turns him down. He reveals to her he thinks her NDEs take her to the rings of Saturn. A sheriff pays Hap a visit and discovers the hostages. He aims his gun at Hap.
7	7	"Chapter 7: Empire of Light"	Zal Batmanglij	Brit Marling & Zal Batmanglij	December 16, 2016
OA has a premonition of a big space with a metallic sound, but she cannot tell what it means. She discusses it with Elias, who suggest that her "psychic" capability might be the result of being able to notice even the smallest cues around her. He also tells her to just accept whatever happens. Steve is being sent to Asheville but BBA uses her inheritance check to bribe the drivers to let him go. OA has dinner with her parents, when Nancy gets upset that she knows nothing about what happened to her daughter. OA explains that she scarred herself with the notations of the movements that open another dimension and she knows all this because she is "the original angel", which causes Nancy to slap her. French suggests to OA that she forgive Nancy and Abel and consider them as her parents because they are one of the reasons she came back from her NDEs. Steve accuses OA of using him and the rest of the group just so she can return to Homer, then stabs her leg with a pencil. She embraces him and calms him down. He asks her how she survived all those years and she replies she did because she was not alone.
8	8	"Chapter 8: Invisible Self"	Zal Batmanglij	Brit Marling & Zal Batmanglij	December 16, 2016
Hap convinces the sheriff that OA and Homer can cure his dying wife. Once healed, the sheriff's wife reveals she is an NDE survivor and can give them the fifth movement. Upon her doing so, Hap kills her and her husband. He releases OA on the side of the road, telling her he will jump dimensions with the others. French breaks into OA's house, discovers some books that seem to be the source of OA's story (e.g., Homer's Iliad), and shares the revelation with the others. Days later, a shooter approaches the school cafeteria where the teenagers are eating lunch. The teenagers and BBA, fearing for the lives of all present, desperately decide to enact OA's five choreographic movements. Bewildered, the shooter is easily subdued, but a stray bullet hits OA in the heart through the cafeteria window where she had been watching from outside. As medics tend to her, OA tells the teenagers and BBA that she can now feel herself going to another dimension.

=== Part II (2019) ===
No. overall	No. in part	Title	Directed by	Written by	Original release date
9	1	"Chapter 1: Angel of Death"	Zal Batmanglij	Brit Marling & Zal Batmanglij	March 22, 2019
In San Francisco, private detective Karim Washington agrees to help an elderly Vietnamese woman find her missing granddaughter, Michelle. Karim discovers Michelle's former hideout in an abandoned house, where she won tens of thousands of dollars playing "Q Symphony," an online puzzle game. Karim theorizes the game is a recruitment and crowdsourcing tool created by tech guru Pierre Ruskin. Karim infiltrates the Q Symphony headquarters hidden in the C&H Sugar refinery, where he finds inmates having their dreams monitored. Meanwhile, an adult Nina Azarova collapses in San Francisco as Prairie is shot; Prairie awakens in Nina's body, in an alternate dimension where Joe Biden is President in 2016. Nina was never blind, her father lived into old age, and Pierre Ruskin is her boyfriend. She contacts Nancy, who does not know her, having gone through with her original intention to adopt a boy. Prairie is wrongfully put on psychiatric hold after exhibiting what her attending nurse views as erratic and delusional behavior, and accepts an offer to check into the secluded Treasure Island psychiatric hospital. Homer is a resident psychiatrist and does not recognize her. Rachel, Scott, and Renata are patients. The facility's director is Hap, under the name of Dr. Percy, who greets her as "Prairie."
10	2	"Chapter 2: Treasure Island"	Zal Batmanglij	Damien Ober & Nicki Paluga	March 22, 2019
Hap continues to tighten his grip on Prairie by placing her in isolation from the other captives. Prairie unsuccessfully tries to help Homer remember his life from the original dimension. Out of sympathy, Homer decides to allow Prairie to reconcile with Scott, Rachel, and Renata. Rachel, no longer having the ability to speak, uses objects to tell Prairie that Hap is planning to make a map across the multiple dimensions for his benefit. Meanwhile, Karim meets Marlow Rhodes, a former doctor who worked for Ruskin, who says that the house is a benefactor of the dreams. Karim realizes that the house is put on a Russian trust owned by Nina, Ruskin's girlfriend, and he decides to go see Prairie/Nina at the clinic. Hap takes Rachel to assist in his experiment on the clinic. Rachel comes across a classified area in Hap's experiment where she sees something horrific. Rachel stabs Hap in the stomach, and Hap accidentally breaks her neck while trying to get her off him, killing her. Rachel's subconscious then transfers from her body to the original dimension from the prior season, where she finds sanctuary in the vanity mirror of Buck's room.
11	3	"Chapter 3: Magic Mirror"	Andrew Haigh	Nicki Paluga & Dominic Orlando	March 22, 2019
Back in the original dimension, Prairie died after being shot at the school. Her companions struggle to cope with the loss: Buck and BBA are about to move away; Steve and his new girlfriend Angie debate about teaching the movements to others to continue Prairie's legacy; Jesse becomes depressed following his brush with death; French struggles with his faith in OA. Suddenly, Buck sees a vision of Rachel on his vanity mirror and contacts the group, but the vanity was sold behind their back to a faraway department center, forcing them to drive hundreds of miles to successfully get the mirror. They take sanctuary at a church, and French temporarily splits from the group and has a one-night-stand with a man who recommends a psychic in Nebraska for support. The group then treks there, but the vanity accidentally gets broken. At the psychic's house, the psychic helps Rachel come into contact with the group through a television. The group deduces from Rachel's messages that Prairie successfully made it to another dimension, and that it is "only safe for BBA to go" there.
12	4	"Chapter 4: SYZYGY"	Zal Batmanglij	Brit Marling & Zal Batmanglij	March 22, 2019
After Rachel's murder, Hap incinerates her corpse. Karim visits Prairie/Nina to find out about her involvement in CURI. Prairie pleads with Karim to help her get out of the clinic in exchange for her assisting Karim in his case. They come to an agreement and they break out of the clinic. Homer goes on an unsuccessful date, and Hap meets an enigmatic woman named Elodie who claims that she, too, is an inter-dimensional traveler like Hap. Meanwhile, Prairie and Karim head inside Nina's apartment and find a closet full of cassette tapes and a note marked "SYZYGY", in reference to a bar in downtown San Francisco. Prairie heads to the bar as Nina, alongside Karim, who looks for more clues in the venue. Prairie is strapped to a chair on the stage where a telepathic octopus, Old Night, straps his tentacles onto Prairie and has her communicate messages via his telepathy. Old Night figures out Prairie's true self, the OA, and strangles her to death to help her find clues in her investigation. A shocked Karim cuts one of Old Night's tentacles off, killing him, and resuscitates Prairie. They flee down the bar's basement and go through a door similar to one shown in Q Symphony.
13	5	"Chapter 5: The Medium & the Engineer"	Zal Batmanglij	Brit Marling & Damien Ober & Henry Bean	March 22, 2019
Prairie and Karim go through a sewer that leads them to inside the house on Nob Hill. They then solve some of the house's puzzles together, until they somehow split from each other. Karim explores the labyrinthine sections of the house and finds an unconscious Fola. He breaks through one of the walls, and escorts Fola, managing to save her in the process. Prairie journeys deeper inside, where she comes across a flock of living, telepathic trees that tell her that Hap is planning to make a powerful discovery that would make her lose her faith. The trees warn Prairie to form a tribe and that Nina is the key to doing so. Meanwhile, Homer comes across incriminating files that implicate Hap's involvement in CURI as his recorded conversations with Ruskin recall the history of the house. He also uncovers Hap's lie about Rachel when he finds out that Rachel was not sent to another clinic. Meanwhile, Hap tries to knock out Elodie in her apartment to use her for his experiments. However, she catches wind of his intentions and uses cubes of dancing robots that initiate the movements, sending her to another dimension and killing her. A shocked Hap leaves the premises.
14	6	"Chapter 6: Mirror Mirror"	Andrew Haigh	Dominic Orlando & Claire Kiechel	March 22, 2019
BBA and the boys continue their journey across America. Their car breaks down and they hitchhike to a restaurant, where Jesse theorizes that they should head to Treasure Island in San Francisco to look for Prairie. They realize through television that they are wanted fugitives, and that an Amber alert is put out on Buck, a minor. They flee to avoid attention and take a bus trip to the house of BBA's dying uncle Carl in California where they stay for a day. However, things take a tragic turn when Jesse fatally overdoses on Carl's medication and the group tries to save him to no avail. They leave, but Steve stays behind to hopefully revive Jesse a second time. Unsuccessful and exhausted, he suddenly shaves his head. Meanwhile, Buck, Angie, French and BBA mourn Jesse's loss at a motel room and discuss going to Treasure Island, until Prairie's psychologist, Elias, arrives at their room and suggests that they should continue on with their journey as he claims that Prairie is going to need their help on her journey as the OA. The group then decides to trek to Treasure Island.
15	7	"Chapter 7: Nina Azarova"	Anna Rose Holmer	Brit Marling & Henry Bean	March 22, 2019
Homer briefly confronts Hap about Rachel's whereabouts, but Hap lies, telling Homer that Rachel killed herself. Homer then tells Hap that Scott explained about his NDE, where he sees Hap and Prairie together in a vision of a different dimension. Hap then contacts Scott, offering him his and Renata's freedom if he helps navigate the house on Nob Hill; Scott accepts the offer. Scott goes inside the house, but he suddenly collapses and is collected by Hap to be experimented on. Meanwhile, Prairie and Karim reunite as they find video footage of Michelle in the house's attic. They then have a falling out after Karim is unfazed by Prairie's claims about the dimensions and of Buck/Michelle. Prairie then crosses paths with Elodie, who advises her to let Nina have control of her body as well. Prairie drowns herself in a bathtub and resurrects as Nina. She then heads to Treasure Island and asks to talk to Hap. Meanwhile, Karim confronts Ruskin, who brags about getting away with his wrongdoings with the house because he believes nobody will come after him. He reveals that Michelle is alive but in a coma and that the house started to dream about Karim, calling for him to come back.
16	8	"Chapter 8: Overview"	Zal Batmanglij	Brit Marling & Zal Batmanglij	March 22, 2019
Prairie helps Homer remember his memories and manages to convince Hap to show his research: mutated humans in a vegetated pool that serve as glimpses to other dimensions. They are revealed to be Scott and alternate versions of French, Jesse, and Steve. Prairie reverts to herself and belittles Hap for his cruelty. Hap corners her in a location surrounded by robots that initiate the movements to send them to another dimension. Hap fatally shoots Homer, and Prairie tells a dying Homer to look for her in the next dimension. In the original dimension, Steve and the group reunite at Treasure Island, where BBA can sense OA's presence in danger and they initiate the movements to help her until Steve collapses. Karim makes it into the attic of the Nob Hill house, having solved the puzzle, and witnesses Prairie floating in the sky. She suddenly falls down, transitioning her to the third dimension with Hap. It is revealed that the next dimension is inside the soundstage of a television show, where an injured Prairie is referred to as "Brit" and Hap is her husband, "Jason Isaacs", who has a British accent. Karim notices a version of Buck in that universe and calls for him, as Buck is pulled inside the attic by Karim, waking up Michelle from her coma. Prairie and Hap get inside an ambulance, but Steve, having successfully jumped dimensions, catches up, reuniting with Prairie and recognizing "Jason Isaacs" as Hap.

== Production ==
The series was conceived by Brit Marling and Zal Batmanglij and they began working on the concept in December 2012. They spent two years working on The OA on their own, before pitching to studios. From the early stages of development onward, they were telling the story out loud and noting one another's reactions to the story to refine it accordingly. They found it difficult to summarize the series in a written story, so they developed it aurally. When executives read the script of the first hour, they asked if the story "really [went] somewhere". Marling and Batmanglij then began to tell the story from beginning to end, playing all the characters and acting out the big moments through many hours. They worked with Brad Pitt's Plan B Entertainment, which connected with the story and shared notes before it went to networks and studios. Following a multiple-network bidding war, the series was first announced on March 5, 2015, when Netflix ordered eight one-hour long episodes with Plan B and Anonymous Content also on board. The announcement revealed that Marling would star, Batmanglij would direct, and both would write and executive produce. Marling and Batmanglij held similar positions in their previous two collaborations, Sound of My Voice and The East.

Rostam Batmanglij, Zal's brother, worked as one of the composers on the series, and he also wrote its theme music. He previously composed for both Sound of My Voice and The East. Choreographer Ryan Heffington created The Movements, which are inspired by interpretive dance. Heffington first professionally worked with them on The East, and had been an acquaintance of both from earlier than that.

The final chapter of Part I includes a dedication to Allison Wilke. Wilke, also known professionally as A.W. Gryphon, was a producer on the series who died of breast cancer three days after the series was finished and a month before its release.

== Cancellation and fan response ==
On August 5, 2019, despite the generally positive reception to the show, Netflix canceled the series after two seasons, leaving the show with a cliffhanger ending. Marling wrote that she and Batmanglij were "deeply sad" that they would not be able to finish the show. Fans responded with a #SaveTheOA and #TheOAisReal campaign on Twitter, a Change.org petition, and by posting video of themselves performing The Movements from the show. Additionally, the OA fan base raised funds for a digital billboard in Times Square. Marling wrote that she was moved by the fan support. One fan went on a hunger strike outside Netflix's Los Angeles Headquarters to press for the show's return; Marling and Batmanglij visited her and offered her food and water. Some fans online put forward a theory that the cancellation announcement was just a meta publicity stunt. Prominent creators of other television series also expressed their love for The OA, including Shonda Rhimes, Sam Esmail and Alex Kurtzman. On June 13, 2025, during an appearance on Live with Kelly and Mark, Jason Isaacs stated that The OA "is not over" and shared that he, Batmanglij, and Marling had agreed to do "whatever it takes" to bring the series back.

== Reception ==
=== Critical response ===
In 2021, The OA was named the ninth best TV show of all time by Empire. BBC listed it as one of the 100 greatest TV series of the 21st century at number 88. The series was also listed by several publications as one of the best TV shows of the 2010s. NME named it the 20th best TV show of the decade, while Wired listed it as the sixth best. Collider also included the series on its unranked "60 Best TV Shows of the Decade" list.

==== Part I ====
Part I of The OA garnered a polarized but generally positive response from critics. Rotten Tomatoes assigned the first season a 78% critical approval rating and an average rating of 7.60/10 based on 67 reviews, writing that "The OA is more than OK." Metacritic, based on 25 reviews, assigned the series a rating of 63 out of 100, indicating "generally favorable reviews". Most reviewers acknowledged the series' ambition and praised its mystery and direction. Reviewers made both favorable and unfavorable comparisons to another Netflix Original, Stranger Things.

John Doyle of The Globe and Mail wrote, "The OA is Netflix's strongest and strangest original production since Stranger Things. In terms of substantive, original drama, it transcends it. Mind you, it is unclassifiable in the context of drama, mystery, science-fiction and fantasy, since it is straddling all sorts of lines and blurring them. It is outright astounding and brilliant, too." Tim Surette at TV Guide said that "the final moments of Episode 5 – probably the best episode of the first season – was some of the most reaffirming television I've ever seen, not just for the show but for life itself. I've never really had this kind of a relationship with a series while watching it, but it's that experience that makes it well worth viewing." New York Magazine's review was entitled "Netflix's The OA Is an Extraordinary, Binge-Worthy December Surprise".

Tristram Fane Saunders of The Daily Telegraph gave a mixed review of 3 out of 5 stars and noted the series' potential but criticized its similarity to fellow Netflix Original Stranger Things, claiming that the series was attempting to be "stranger than Stranger Things" but "on the basis of the first four episodes, the answer is a resounding no". Saunders's review also highlighted the series' lack of originality and characterization, and derided the dialogue as "portentous [and] self-consciously literary". It also criticized the slow pace as "glacial". However, Saunders also acknowledged the series told an interesting and compelling story, writing that "The OA may be utter hokum, but you'll still be hooked." Daniel Fienberg of The Hollywood Reporter gave a negative review, stating that the series was "a failed, but not wholly worthless, experiment in TV auteurism". Fienberg added "the problem, of course, is that telling you what The OA is vaguely like is just another tease and telling you what it actually is is a recipe for disappointment, because after an enticing and somewhat infuriating build-up, The OA becomes something quite ludicrous as it stumbles toward a climax that is, if I'm generous, merely unearned and if I'm not being generous, a series of offensive overreaches."

Variety published diverging opinions about the series: its TV critic at the time, Sonia Saraiya, gave the show a mixed review that praised the direction and acting but opined that overall "it is hard to take The OA seriously", detailing that "none of it makes any sense", and concluded that "[a]s an exercise in vision, The OA is exciting. As that other thing — a television show — it’s an especially cryptic attempt to say very little of consequence.". A few days later, on the other hand, the magazine's chief film critic Peter Debruge wrote an extremely positive column with the headline "Why The OA is One of the Year's Most Important Films", stating that the show's first season had "the most effective ending [he had] ever seen in a TV series", and that its "final twist [...] left [him] crying uncontrollably for nearly half an hour".

==== Part II ====
Part II received very positive reviews upon its release. On Rotten Tomatoes, the second season has an approval rating of 92% based on 38 reviews, with an average rating of 7.80/10. The website's critical consensus reads, "The OA's second season provides satisfying answers to its predecessors' most maddening enigmas, all while maintaining the singular ambience that fans have come to crave." On Metacritic, it has a weighted average score of 67 out of 100, based on 8 critics, indicating "generally favorable reviews". Critics particularly praised its surrealism, directing and acting.

Empire crowned The OA the best television series of 2019 (so far) in September 2019. The Playlist stated in their review that: "The OA: Part II packs each frame so dense with detail, that not one second of the new season's more-than-eight-hour runtime seems wasted, expositional, cheap, or unearned." Jesse Scheden of IGN gave The OA: Part II a score of 8.8 out of 10, saying the season is "bigger, more ambitious and much weirder than its predecessor". Rachel Syme in The New Republic praised the season, labeling the show as "the best, most inaccessible show on television", saying that "[she wishes] more television was this unafraid to leave its audiences fumbling for understanding."

Daniel Fienberg of The Hollywood Reporter wrote: "The only thing I'm sure of when it comes to The OA is that the process of watching and experiencing an episode is unlike the viewing of any other show on TV and, good or bad, there's value in that." Alex McLevy of The A.V. Club echoed that sentiment, saying "sacrificing your expectations of plausibility feels like a worthwhile price of admission." Jen Chaney of New York Magazine called the season a mind-bender and praised the way it depicted the aftermath of a school shooting.

Ed Power of The Daily Telegraph, gave it 4 out of 5 stars, and wrote that the show "truly comes into its own when you stop attempting to piece together the storyline and instead submit to Marling and Batmanglij's vision." Emily St. James of Vox, initially critical of the first season, wrote of the series: "over time, I kept thinking about it ... until I convinced myself that The OA is kind of genius, while simultaneously being incredibly silly". Haleigh Foutch of Collider said, "Netflix has carved out a space for itself as a home for innovative genre storytelling, and The OA might just be their crowning achievement in that regard."

=== Accolades ===
The OA was nominated at the 2017 GLAAD Media Awards as Outstanding Drama Series. Brit Marling and Zal Batmanglij were nominated for a Writers Guild of America Award for Episodic Drama in 2018 for the episode "Homecoming". Paz Vega was nominated in the Best Female Performance in an International Production category of the 29th Actors and Actresses Union Awards in 2020.
