= Brit Marling =

American actress (born 1982)

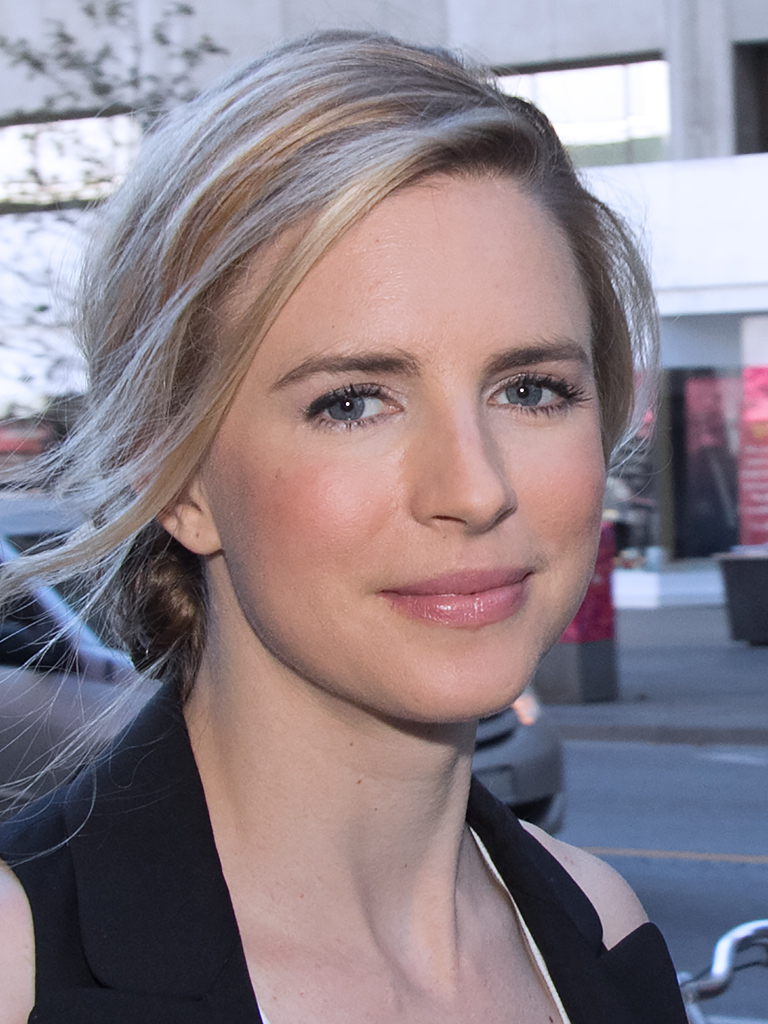
- Marling at the 2014 Toronto International Film Festival
- Born: August 7, 1982 (age 44); Chicago, Illinois, U.S.
- Education: Georgetown University (BA)
- Occupations: Actress; screenwriter
- Years active: 2007–present
- Works: See filmography

Brit Marling (born August 7, 1982) is an American actress and screenwriter. She rose to prominence after starring in several films that premiered at the Sundance Film Festival, including Sound of My Voice (2011), Another Earth (2011), and The East (2013), each of which she co-wrote in addition to playing the lead role. She co-created, wrote, and starred in the mystery series The OA (2016–2019), and the thriller miniseries A Murder at the End of the World (2023).

== Early life and education ==
Marling was born on August 7, 1982, in Chicago, Illinois, the daughter of property developer parents John and Heidi Marling. She was named "Brit" after her Norwegian maternal great-grandmother. She has a sister, Morgan. Marling grew up in Winnetka, Illinois, and Orlando, Florida, where she attended the arts program at Dr. Phillips High School. Marling was interested in acting, but her parents encouraged her to focus on academics. She graduated from Georgetown University in 2005 with degrees in economics and studio art, graduating top of her class and being her class valedictorian.

== Career ==
At Georgetown, Marling met her long-time collaborators, future directors Mike Cahill and Zal Batmanglij. Marling spent the summer of her junior year interning for the investment banking firm Goldman Sachs as an investment analyst. She felt a life spent there would lack meaning and eventually turned down a job offer from the firm, opting instead to move to Cuba with Cahill to film the documentary Boxers and Ballerinas. Co-writing the documentary with Cahill and Nick Shumaker, and co-directing with Cahill, the film helped Marling gain recognition in 2004.

In 2005, Marling moved with Cahill and Batmanglij to Los Angeles. She attended auditions and was offered roles in horror films but turned them down. She stated she "wanted to be able to cast herself in roles that wouldn't require her to play the typical parts offered to young actresses, the perfunctory girlfriend or a crime victim". She was discovered by talent agent Hylda Queally.

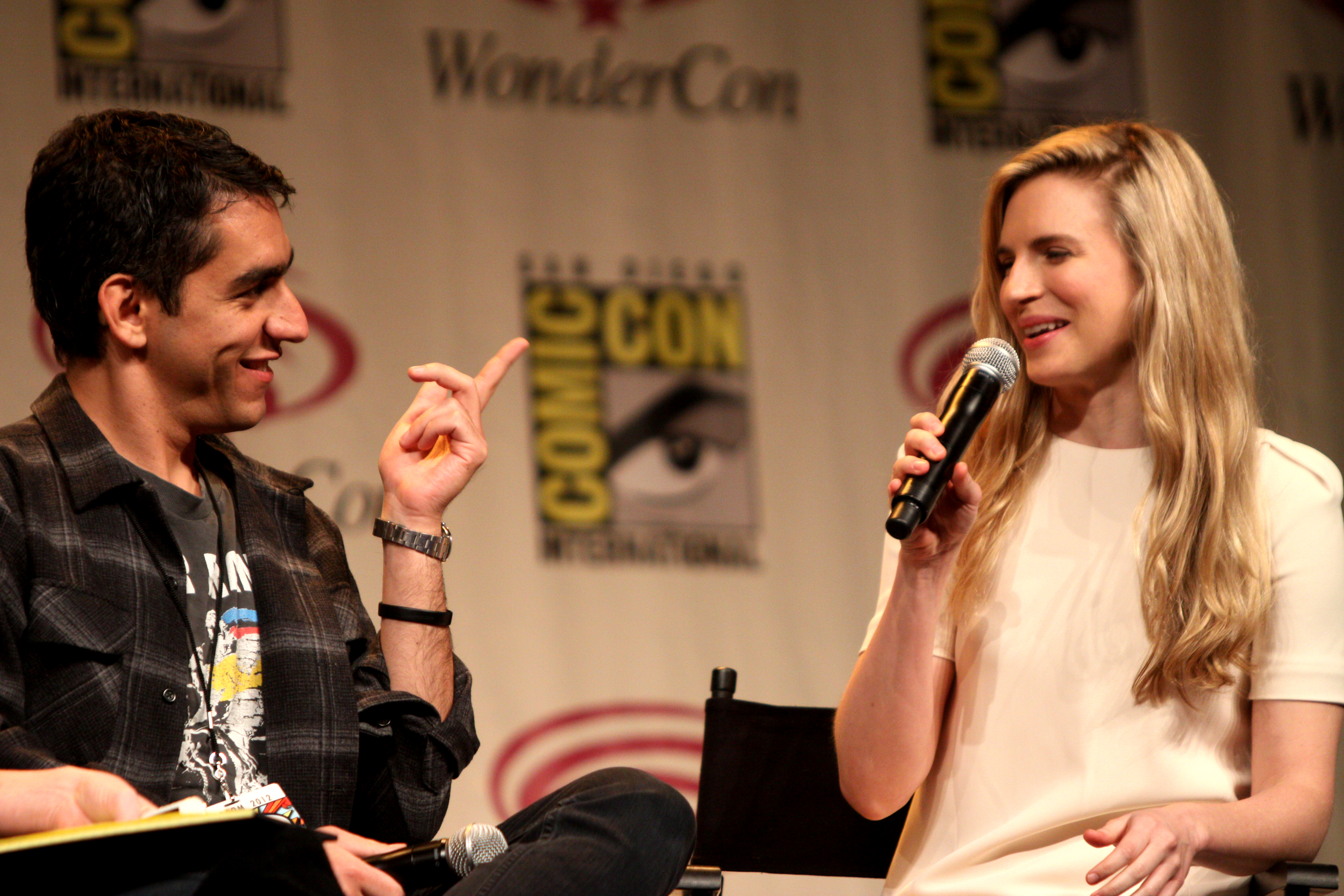
Marling with her frequent collaborator Zal Batmanglij speaking at the 2012 WonderCon in Anaheim, California

In mid-2009, she joined a group of freegans with friend and co-worker Zal Batmanglij, living in tents and retrieving food from dumpsters, to explore how other young people were constructing a meaningful life. Marling co-wrote, co-produced, and acted in the 2011 films Sound of My Voice and Another Earth, directed by Batmanglij and Cahill, respectively. Both of these films were featured at the 2011 Sundance Film Festival, with Another Earth winning the Alfred P. Sloan Prize for outstanding film with science, technology or math as a major theme. In 2012, she played the daughter of Richard Gere's character in Arbitrage. In 2013, she collaborated with Searchlight on the film The East, in which she also played the lead role. Directed by Zal Batmanglij and co-written by Marling and Batmanglij, The East is based on the duo's experience as freegans and their concern with the side effects of prescription drugs.

Marling and Batmanglij collaborated to create the drama series The OA, which debuted in 2016 on Netflix. It was written by Marling and Batmanglij, who produced the series along with Dede Gardner and Jeremy Kleiner of Plan B, and Michael Sugar of Anonymous Content. The show's second season, entitled "Part II", started filming in January 2018 and was released in March 2019 to positive reviews.

In June 2024, Marling and Batmanglij entered an agreement to develop television and film projects with independent production house Sister, led by Cindy Holland, who had been the vice president of original content for Netflix when The OA was developed.

Despite having many roles in films she has co-written, Marling stated she "get[s] a lot more pleasure in acting in other people's stories" since "one of the great pleasures of acting is surrendering to someone else's point of view of the world".

== Filmography ==
=== Film ===
Year	Title	Role	Notes
2004	Boxers and Ballerinas	—	Documentary; Co-director with Mike Cahill
2007	The Recordist	Charlie Hall	Zal Batmanglij's AFI thesis short film
2009	Political Disasters	Brit	
2011	Sound of My Voice	Maggie	Also co-writer and producer Nominated—Georgia Film Critics Association Award for Best Original Screenplay; Nominated—Independent Spirit Award for Best First Feature; Nominated—Independent Spirit Award for Best Supporting Female
2011	Another Earth	Rhoda Williams	Also co-writer and producer San Diego Film Critics Society Award for Best Actress; Sitges Film Festival Award for Best Actress; Nominated—Chicago Film Critics Association Award for Most Promising Performer; Nominated—Independent Spirit Award for Best First Feature; Nominated—Independent Spirit Award for Best First Screenplay; Nominated—Saturn Award for Best Actress; Nominated—Saturn Award for Best Writing
2012	Arbitrage	Brooke Miller	
2012	The Company You Keep	Rebecca Osborne	
2013	The East	Sarah Moss / Jane Owen	Also co-writer and producer
2014	The Better Angels	Nancy Lincoln	
2014	I Origins	Karen	
2014	The Keeping Room	Augusta	
2014	Posthumous	McKenzie Grain	
TBD	Uncanny Valley		Actor, co-writer with Natasha Lyonne

=== Television ===
Year	Title	Role	Notes
2011	Community	Page	Episode: "Early 21st Century Romanticism"
2014	Babylon	Liz Garvey	Main role
2016–2019	The OA	Prairie Johnson / OA / Nina Azarova	Co-creator, co-wrote 10 episodes
2023	A Murder at the End of the World	Lee Andersen	Co-creator, wrote 7 episodes, directed 3 episodes
2026	Star Trek: Starfleet Academy	USS Athena computer	Voice role
