= Maideh Mazda =

Persian food expert

- Born: Maideh Mazda; May 28, 1922; Baku, Azerbaijan, U.S.
- Died: 7 August 2012 (aged 90)
- Other names: Maideh Mazda Magee
- Occupations: Cookbook writer; linguist
- Known for: In a Persian Kitchen
- Spouse: Charles Magee (m. 1959)
- Children: Maya Magee

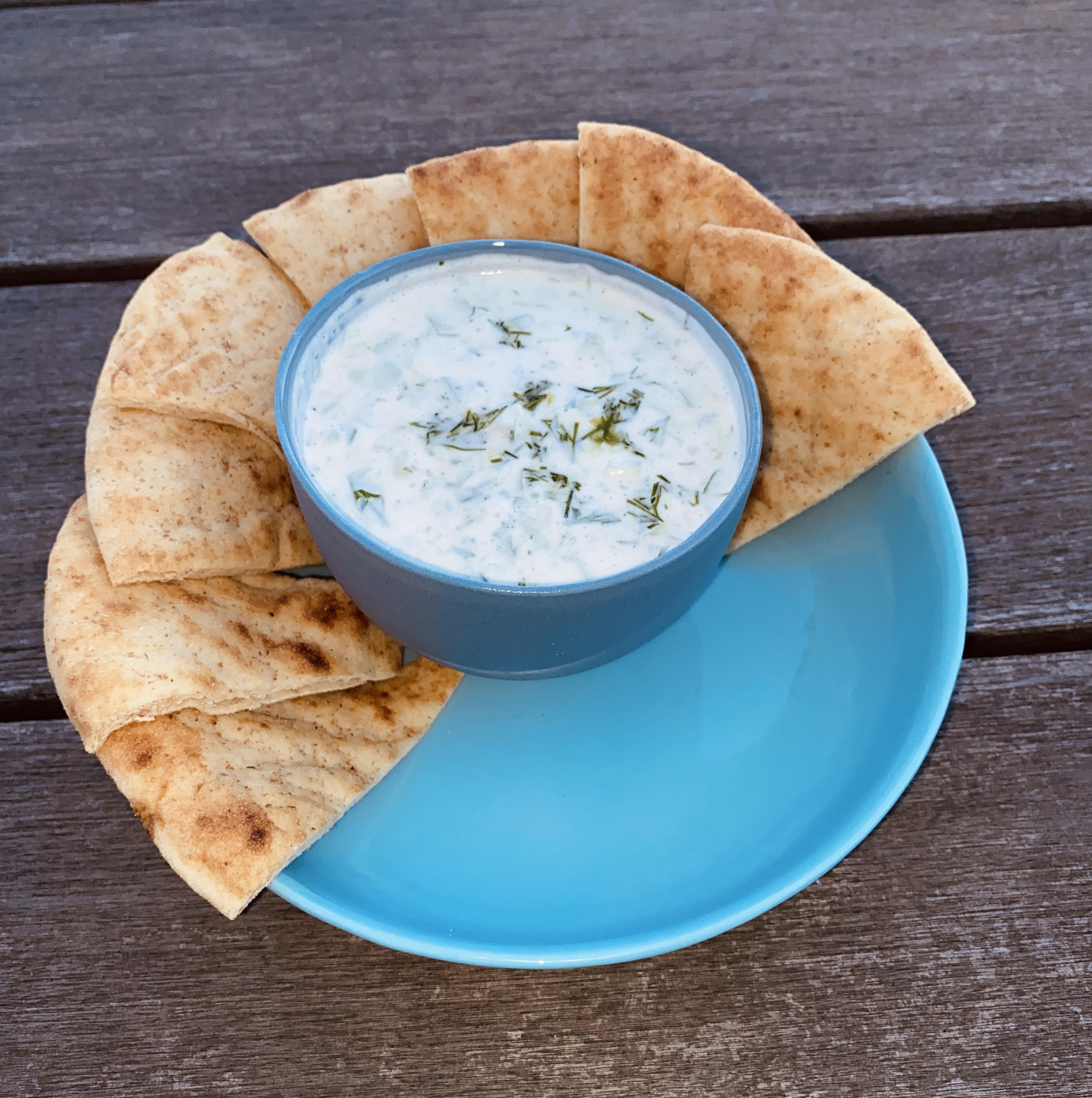
Mast va Khiar (Yogurt with Cucumbers) from Maideh Mazda, In a Persian Kitchen, page 28.

Maideh Mazda (1922–2012) was a Persian food expert, linguist, and author, born and raised in Baku, Azerbaijan in an Iranian family. She published one of the first cookbooks about Persian cuisine for American readers. Entitled In a Persian Kitchen, her cookbook first appeared in 1960 and went through nineteen hardcover editions by the time of her death in 2012. With her husband Charles T. Magee, a member of the U.S. Foreign Service, Mazda traveled to Bulgaria, Canada, France, Latvia, the Soviet Union, Switzerland and Ukraine, where she hosted a number of diplomatic functions. A purveyor of culinary diplomacy in the decades before the Iranian Revolution of 1978-79, she promoted understanding of Iranian and Persian culture among Americans through her cookbooks, public lectures, and demonstrations.

== Personal life and education ==
Mazda was born on May 28, 1922, in Baku, Azerbaijan. Her family was Persian and her grandmother's side came from Tabriz in Iran. Her family moved to Tehran when Mazda was young, where she attended an English-medium high school run by American Presbyterian missionaries. Growing up, she spoke Azeri, Persian, Turkish, and Russian; she later learned English, French, and Bulgarian. Mazda moved to the United States in 1943 to pursue her education, initially in New York. In 1947, she graduated from Douglass College in New Jersey, then the women’s college of Rutgers University, with degrees in history and political science. She went on to earn her master's degree in international relations from the University of California, Berkeley, in 1949.

== Career ==
In the 1950s, Mazda started her teaching career as a language professor. She taught Persian, Turkish, Russian, and English as a second language at the Navy Language School of Georgetown University’s Defense Language Institution and Wayne State University. Throughout the next few decades she taught at a variety of secondary education institutions including the Defense Language Institute, Georgetown University, and Wayne State University. She became an associate professor of languages at the U.S. Naval Intelligence School.

== Cookbook ==
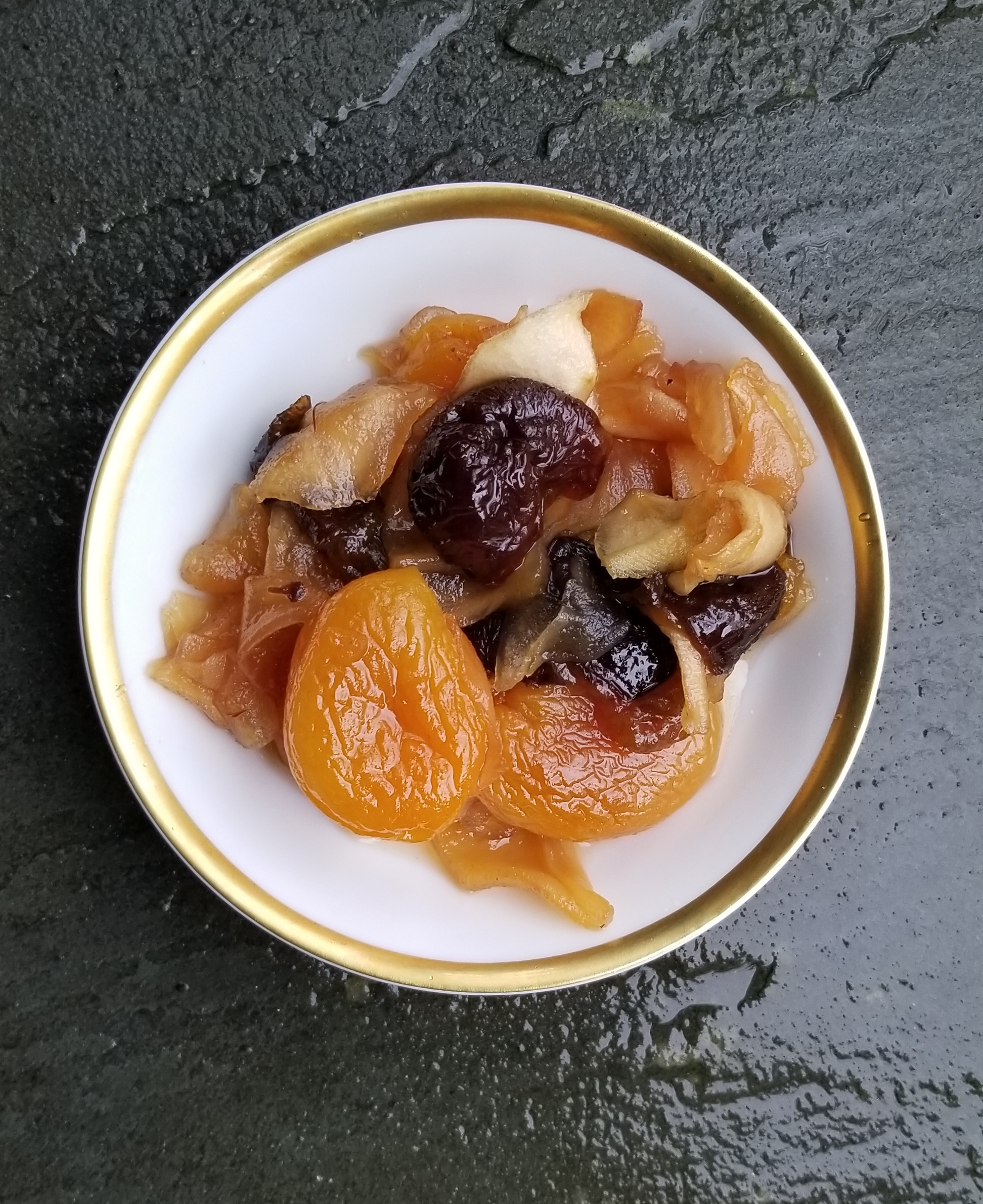
Compote Koshkbar (Dried Fruit Compote), from Maideh Mazda, In a Persian Kitchen (1960), page 151. She wrote that this dish of dried fruit (prunes, apricots and apples poached in a rose water syrup) "is a very popular winter dessert" made "when fresh fruit is very scarce in Persia...."

Maideh Mazda's cookbook, In a Persian Kitchen, was first published in 1960 by the Charles E. Tuttle Company in Japan. The cookbook of 175 pages surveys Iranian cuisine and covers yogurt, appetizers, soups, stuffed vegetables and fruits, pilafs, sauces for pilafs, egg casserole dishes, meat and fowl, desserts, and salads. It offers suggestions for combining these dishes into menus for specific events, such as summer luncheons and winter dinners, with ingredients reflecting what was available according to the season.

After its publication in 1960, In a Persian Kitchen went through nineteen hardcover editions. Craig Claiborne, The New York Times food editor, reviewed In a Persian Kitchen in 1971 and praised it for its “fascinating collection of recipes,” calling it “a pleasure to read.”

As the first to write a cookbook of Persian or Iranian cuisine for an American readership, Maideh Mazda was a precursor to prominent food writers like Najmieh Batmanglij.
