= Michael Sugar =

American film producer

- Occupations: Film and television producer, talent manager
- Years active: 2002–present

Michael Sugar is an American film and television producer and talent manager. He worked for many years as a manager and producer at Anonymous Content, and in 2017 founded the management and production company Sugar23. He won the Academy Award for Best Picture as a producer of Spotlight (2015), and his television credits include 13 Reasons Why, Maniac and The Knick.

== Life and career ==
Sugar attended the Armand Hammer United World College of the American West in New Mexico after which he completed his undergraduate studies in 1995 at Brandeis University. He went on to study law at Georgetown University. He is the son of the producer/distributor Larry Sugar and is married to Lauren Wall Sugar. He is Jewish.

=== Anonymous Content and Sugar23 ===
Sugar spent much of his career at Anonymous Content, where he worked as both a talent manager and a producer. In October 2017 he formed Sugar23, a producing company that launched with a multi-year first-look agreement with Anonymous Content. Under the arrangement he continued to represent his management clients through the Anonymous Content label, and Sugar23's television projects fell within Anonymous Content's first-look and co-financing deal with Paramount Television. At the time the company was announced his management clients included Steven Soderbergh, Richard Linklater, Cary Fukunaga, Edgar Wright, Marc Webb, Patty Jenkins and Robin Wright, together with Spotlight co-writer Josh Singer and The Knick creators Jack Amiel and Michael Begler.

In October 2018 Netflix announced a multi-year film deal with Sugar23.

=== Producing ===
He was an executive producer of the Cinemax series The Knick, starring Clive Owen and directed by Steven Soderbergh. He was also an executive producer of the Netflix series The OA (co-created by Zal Batmanglij and Brit Marling, who also stars), Maniac (starring Emma Stone and Jonah Hill, and directed by Fukunaga) and 13 Reasons Why (starring Dylan Minnette and Katherine Langford).

Sugar won the Academy Award for Best Picture as a producer of Spotlight (2015), starring Mark Ruffalo, Michael Keaton and Rachel McAdams. The film received six nominations at the 88th Academy Awards.

Sugar is a member of the Academy of Television Arts and Sciences and lectures regularly at USC, NYU, Columbia and the American Film Institute. He has been nominated for an Emmy Award, and in 2014 he won a Peabody Award for The Knick.

== Filmography ==
- 2002: WinTuition (TV series, executive producer)
- 2004: A Separate Peace (TV movie, executive producer)
- 2007: Rendition (executive producer)
- 2011: Restless (executive producer)
- 2012: Big Miracle (producer)
- 2012: Transit (Short, executive producer)
- 2013: Stroumboulopoulos (TV series, executive producer)
- 2013: The Fifth Estate (producer)
- 2014: The Knick (TV series, executive producer)
- 2014: The Keeping Room (executive producer)
- 2015: Spotlight (producer)
- 2016: The OA (TV series, executive producer)
- 2016: Collateral Beauty (producer)
- 2017: 13 Reasons Why (TV series, executive producer)
- 2018: Maniac (executive producer)
- 2019: The Report (producer)
- 2019: The Laundromat (producer)
- 2020: Worth (producer)
- 2024: Presence (producer)
