= Zal Batmanglij =

American film director (born 1981)

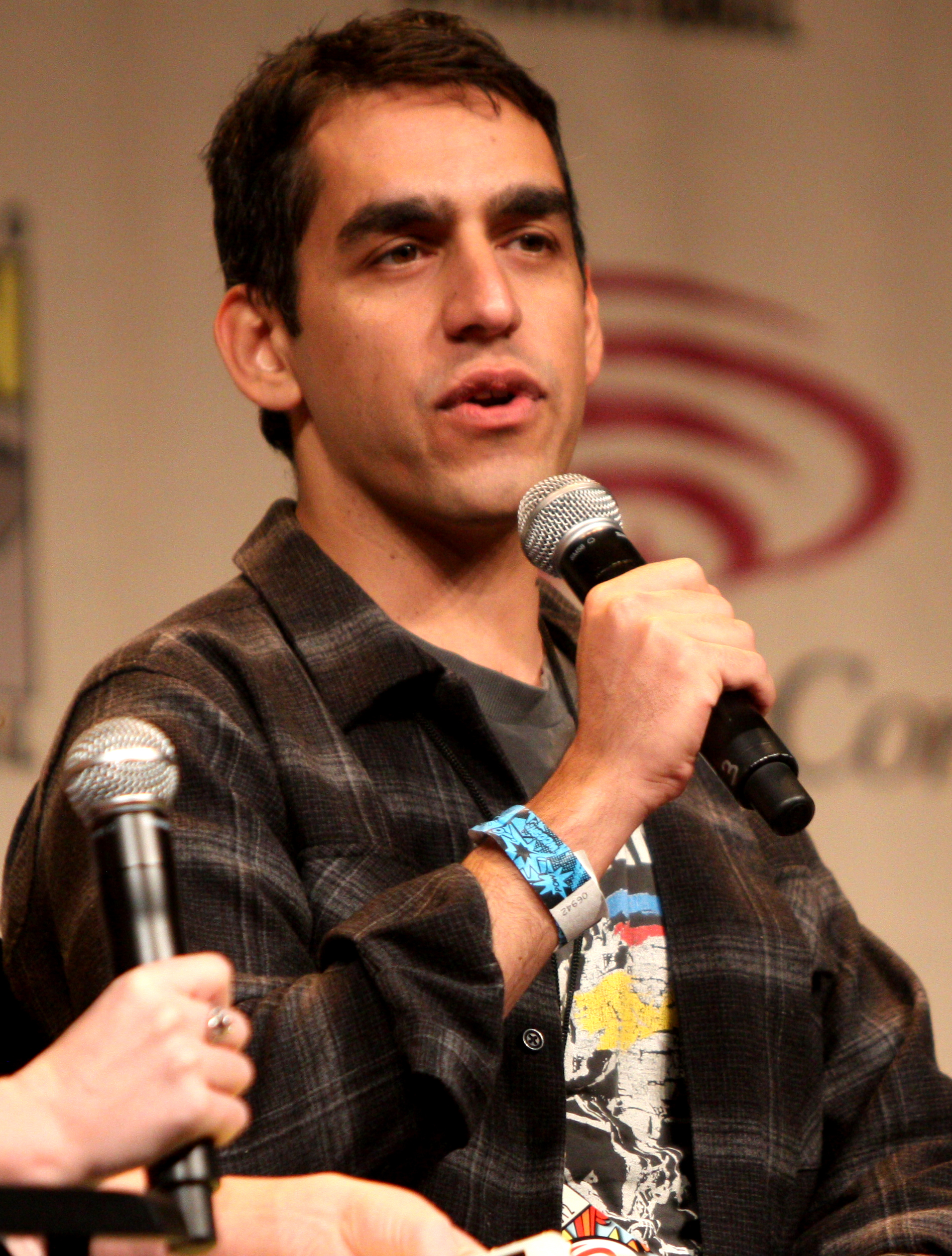
- Batmanglij at Wondercon 2012
- Born: April 28, 1981 (age 45); Vence, France
- Education: Georgetown University (BA); American Film Institute (MFA)
- Occupations: Film director; screenwriter
- Years active: 2011–present
- Parent: Najmieh Batmanglij
- Relatives: Rostam Batmanglij (brother)

Zal Batmanglij (/ˈzɑːl bɑːtˈmɑːŋɡlɪdʒ/; born April 28, 1981) is an American film director and screenwriter. He directed and co-wrote the 2011 film Sound of My Voice and the 2013 film The East, both of which premiered at the Sundance Film Festival, as well as the Netflix series The OA, which debuted in 2016.

== Early life and education ==
Batmanglij was born in 1981 in France to Iranian parents and grew up in Washington, D.C. His mother, Najmieh Batmanglij, is a cookbook author and chef; his father is a book publisher. His younger brother Rostam was a founding member of the band Vampire Weekend. Both brothers are gay.

Batmanglij studied anthropology and English at Georgetown University, graduating in 2002. At Georgetown he met Mike Cahill in a philosophy class. They took a screenwriting course together and co-directed a short film that won the Georgetown Film Festival. Brit Marling saw the film and asked if she could work with them. Several years later, following Marling's graduation, the three friends moved to Los Angeles, California, where Batmanglij was a directing fellow at the AFI Conservatory. For his thesis film, he made a 35mm short called The Recordist (2007), which starred Marling.

== Career ==
In 2011, Batmanglij's debut feature, Sound of My Voice, written with Marling and starring her, premiered at the Sundance Film Festival. Shortly thereafter, Fox Searchlight Pictures purchased Sound of My Voice, as well as Batmanglij and Marling's next feature script, The East. Batmanglij also directed The East, starring Marling, Elliot Page, and Alexander Skarsgård. The film premiered at Sundance in 2013.

Batmanglij and Marling collaborated to create drama series The OA, which debuted in 2016 on Netflix. It was written by Marling and Batmanglij, who produced the series along with Dede Gardner and Jeremy Kleiner of Plan B, and Michael Sugar of Anonymous Content. Batmanglij's The OA is known for its novel take on mysterious and mind-bending psychological dramas. Because of the high praise it has received from critics, the series was nominated twice for the Writers Guild Awards (WGA) "Best Episodic Drama" award.

Batmanglij and Marling worked together again in 2023 to co-produce the psychological thriller and murder mystery miniseries titled A Murder at the End of the World, which has been critically acclaimed by reviewer Kevin Considine for its statements on artificial intelligence.

== Filmography ==
Short film

Year	Title	Director	Writer
2007	The Recordist	Yes	Yes

Feature film

Year	Title	Director	Writer
2011	Sound of My Voice	Yes	Yes
2013	The East	Yes	Yes

Television

Year	Title	Director	Writer	Executive producer	Creator	Notes
2015	Wayward Pines	Yes	No	No	No	Episodes "Our Town, Our Law" and "One of Our Senior Realtors Has Chosen to Retire"
2016–2019	The OA	Yes	Yes	Yes	Yes	Directed 13 episodes, wrote 7 episodes
2023	A Murder at the End of the World	Yes	Yes	Yes	Yes	Directed 4 episodes, wrote 6 episodes

== Awards and nominations ==
Year	Award	Category	Work	Result
2012	Gotham Award	Breakthrough Director	Sound of My Voice	Nominated
2013	Independent Spirit Award	Best First Feature	Sound of My Voice	Nominated
2013	Traverse City Film Festival	Founders Prize For Best Drama	The East	Won
2018	Writers Guild of America Award	Episodic Drama	The OA (Episode "Homecoming")	Nominated
