= Sound of My Voice =

- Theatrical release poster
- Directed by: Zal Batmanglij
- Written by: Zal Batmanglij; Brit Marling
- Produced by: Hans Ritter; Brit Marling; Shelley Surpin
- Starring: Christopher Denham; Nicole Vicius; Brit Marling
- Cinematography: Rachel Morrison
- Edited by: Tamara Meem
- Music by: Rostam Batmanglij
- Production company: Skyscraper Films
- Distributed by: Fox Searchlight Pictures
- Release dates: January 24, 2011 (Sundance); April 27, 2012 (United States)
- Running time: 85 minutes
- Country: United States
- Language: English
- Budget: $135,000
- Box office: $408,015

Sound of My Voice is a 2011 American psychological thriller film directed by Zal Batmanglij in his feature directorial debut. The screenplay was written by Batmanglij and Brit Marling, and the film stars Christopher Denham, Nicole Vicius, and Marling. The plot focuses on two documentary filmmakers who infiltrate a cult led by a charismatic woman who claims to be from the future.

The film premiered at the 2011 Sundance Film Festival and was also selected to close the 2011 SXSW Film Festival. It was released by Fox Searchlight Pictures on April 27, 2012.

== Plot ==
In Los Angeles, substitute teacher Peter Aitken and his girlfriend, aspiring writer Lorna Michaelson, are making a documentary about a secretive cult. Their goal is to expose its leader, a mysterious woman named Maggie, as a fraud.

After being deemed ready, Peter and Lorna are instructed to shower thoroughly and dress in white surgical gowns. They are then driven blindfolded to a secret basement location. There, they are received by Klaus, with whom they perform an intricate, practiced handshake. Inside, they join eight other members to meet Maggie, who uses an oxygen tank. She explains that the strict hygiene protocols are necessary to protect her from her severe illness.

Maggie claims she is a time-traveler from the year 2054. She describes a future of war and famine and says she has returned to select a group to prepare for the coming hardships. Maggie leads the group through intense psychological exercises, but she never definitively proves or disproves her extraordinary story. Her charisma is powerful, and both Peter and Lorna find their skepticism wavering. Lorna grows concerned as Peter, who was initially the most adamant about exposing Maggie, seems to be falling under her spell.

After several meetings, Maggie instructs Peter to bring her Abigail Pritchett, an eccentric eight-year-old from his class. Maggie claims the girl is her mother and threatens to ban Peter and Lorna from the group if he fails to comply. When Peter considers following Maggie's order, Lorna is outraged. Soon after, Lorna is privately approached by a woman named Carol Briggs, who identifies herself as a Justice Department agent and states that Maggie is a wanted felon. Lorna agrees to help Carol capture Maggie, keeping the plan a secret from Peter.

Peter arranges for Maggie to meet Abigail during a class field trip at the La Brea Tar Pits. When Maggie and the girl meet, Peter is stunned to see them wordlessly perform the cult's secret handshake. Abigail asks Maggie how she knew the handshake, and Maggie replies, "You taught it to me." At that moment, law enforcement agents burst in and apprehend Maggie. As distraught cult members accuse Peter of betrayal, he exchanges a look with Lorna, who gives a slight smile. Abigail then asks Peter who Maggie was, and he, shaken, replies that he does not know.

== Cast ==
- Christopher Denham as Peter Aitken
  - Jack Griffo as Young Peter
- Nicole Vicius as Lorna Michaelson
- Brit Marling as Maggie
- Davenia McFadden as Carol Briggs
- Kandice Stroh as Joanne
- Richard Wharton as Klaus
- Christy Myers as Mel
- Alvin Lam as Lam
- Constance Wu as Christine
- Matthew Carey as Lyle
- Jacob Price as PJ
- David Haley as O'Shea
- James Urbaniak as Mr. Pritchett
- Avery Pohl as Abigail Pritchett
- Kyle Hacker as Lucas

== Reception ==
Sound of My Voice was named among the Top Indie Films at Festivals in 2011 on criticWIRE.

On the review aggregator website Rotten Tomatoes, 76% of 109 critics' reviews are positive, with an average rating of 6.9/10. Metacritic, which uses a weighted average, assigned the film a score of 67 out of 100, based on 30 critics, indicating "generally favorable" reviews.

Manohla Dargis of The New York Times wrote: "Nobody is gutted in Sound of My Voice, a smart, effectively unsettling movie about the need to believe and the hard, cruel arts of persuasion. But over time the men and women who meet in a mysterious house in an anonymous Los Angeles neighborhood... are opened up bit by bit, wound by wound, until they’re sobbing and laughing, their insides smeared across the carpet."

Brent Simon of Shockya.com called the film "a delicate, mesmeric thing that dances darkly along the edges of psychology, religion and science-fiction, raising questions about faith, identity, self-betterment and romantic connection."

In September 2012, the film won the Octopus d’Or for Best International Feature Film at the Strasbourg European Fantastic Film Festival.

In his review of 2012's standout films, Variety critic Peter Debruge noted that he had watched Sound of My Voice four times, calling it an "ingenious low-budget puzzler."

== Planned follow-ups ==
The film was originally intended to be the first installment of a trilogy.

== See also ==
- The East (2013 film)
- The OA (television series)
