= The East (2013 film) =

- Theatrical release poster
- Directed by: Zal Batmanglij
- Written by: Zal Batmanglij; Brit Marling
- Produced by: Ridley Scott; Michael Costigan; Jocelyn Hayes-Simpson; Brit Marling
- Starring: Brit Marling; Alexander Skarsgård; Elliot Page (Note: Credited as Ellen Page); Patricia Clarkson
- Cinematography: Roman Vasyanov
- Edited by: Andrew Weisblum; Bill Pankow
- Music by: Halli Cauthery; Harry Gregson-Williams
- Production company: Scott Free Productions
- Distributed by: Fox Searchlight Pictures
- Release dates: January 20, 2013 (Sundance); May 31, 2013 (United States); June 28, 2013 (United Kingdom)
- Running time: 116 minutes
- Countries: United States; United Kingdom
- Language: English
- Budget: $6.5 million
- Box office: $2.4 million

The East is a 2013 thriller film directed by Zal Batmanglij and starring Brit Marling, Alexander Skarsgård, and Elliot Page. Writers Batmanglij and Marling spent two months in 2009 practicing freeganism and co-wrote a screenplay inspired by their experiences and drawing on thrillers from the 1970s. The American studio Fox Searchlight Pictures had bought rights to distribute Batmanglij's previous film Sound of My Voice and also collaborated with the director to produce The East. With Ridley Scott as producer and Tony Scott as executive producer, Fox Searchlight contracted Scott Free Productions, headquartered in London, to produce the film. The East was filmed in two months in Shreveport, Louisiana at the end of 2011. The film premiered to strong reviews at the 2013 Sundance Film Festival on January 20, 2013. It was released in theaters on May 31, 2013.

== Plot ==
Jane, an operative for private intelligence firm Hiller Brood, is assigned by her boss, Sharon, to infiltrate The East, an underground activist, anarchist and environmentalist organization that has launched a vandalistic attack against a corporate leader and threatens two more as retribution for ecological crimes. Calling herself Sarah, she joins drifters in hitching train rides. When one drifter, Luca, helps her escape from the police, she identifies the symbol of The East hanging from Luca's car mirror. Sarah self-inflicts an arm injury that she tells Luca was caused in the escape so he can get her medical attention. He takes her to a seemingly abandoned house in the woods where members of The East live and one of them, Doc, treats her.

Sarah is given two nights to recover before she must leave. At an elaborate dinner involving straitjackets, Sarah is tested and fails, exposing how selfishly she and many others live their lives. Sarah is caught spying one night by Eve (a group member who is deaf) and signs to her she is an undercover agent, threatening Eve with jail if she stays; Eve leaves the next morning. Sarah is recruited to fill the missing member's role on a "jam", a term for protest by subversive means. Sarah reluctantly participates in The East's next jam and learns that the group's members have all been damaged by corporate activities. For example, Doc was poisoned by a fluoroquinolone antibiotic and his neurosystem is degenerating. The East infiltrates a party for the antibiotic company's senior executives and adds the antibiotic to the champagne. The East announce this via YouTube: one executive's health begins to fail, revealing the drug's side effects. After seeing the jam's effectiveness, compounded by her attraction to charismatic Benji, Sarah questions the morality of her job.

Another member, Izzy, is the daughter of a petrochemical CEO. The group uses this connection to gain access to him and forces him to bathe in the waterway he has been using as a toxic dumping ground. This goes wrong when security arrives and shoots the fleeing Izzy. At the squat, Doc's hands tremble too much for him to perform surgery. Working under his guidance, Sarah manages to remove the bullet but Izzy dies. This is the catalyst for Sarah and Benji's romance and they have sex.

Sarah implores Benji to leave, but he insists they participate in a fourth and final jam. Sarah initially refuses but gives in. When she awakens after sleeping in the car, she realizes that Benji is driving her to Hiller Brood's headquarters. He reveals that he has always suspected her of being a spy, as did Luca, who brought her in as a test. Benji wants Sarah to obtain a non-official cover (NOC: unofficial espionage agents) global list of Hiller Brood agents, to "watch" them. Having copied the list onto her cell phone's memory card, Sarah runs into Sharon and confronts her about the firm's activities, revealing her new allegiances. Sharon has Sarah's cellphone confiscated as she leaves. As Hiller Brood had been sharing information with the FBI, The East's hideout is raided and Doc is arrested but sacrifices himself to ensure that the remaining members can escape. Sarah tells Benji she has failed to get the NOC list, which Benji reveals he meant to use to expose the undercover agents, even though that meant they could be killed. Sarah chooses not to go on the run and they part as Benji heads out of the country. In truth, Sarah still has the list because she had swallowed the memory card. The film ends with an epilogue of her contacting her undercover former coworkers and informing them of the corporate crimes Hiller Brood's clients want to protect, peacefully furthering The East's goals.

== Cast ==
- Brit Marling as Sarah Moss/Jane Owen
- Alexander Skarsgård as Benji
- Elliot Page as Izzy
- Toby Kebbell as Doc
- Shiloh Fernandez as Luca
- Julia Ormond as Paige Williams
- Patricia Clarkson as Sharon
- Jason Ritter as Tim
- Danielle Macdonald as Tess
- Billy Slaughter as Trevor "The Fed"
- Wilbur Fitzgerald as Robert McCabe
- Aldis Hodge as Thumbs
- Billy Magnussen as Porty McCabe
- Jamey Sheridan as Richard Cannon

== Production ==
- Zal Batmanglij – director, screenwriter
- Brit Marling – producer, screenwriter
- Ridley Scott – producer
- Michael Costigan – producer
- Jocelyn Hayes-Simpson – producer
- Tony Scott – executive producer
- Roman Vasyanov – cinematographer
- Andrew Weisblum – editor
- Bill Pankow – editor
- Halli Cauthery – music
- Harry Gregson-Williams – themes for score
- Alex DiGerlando – production designer
- Jenny Gering – costume designer
- Nikki Black – art director
- Cynthia Slagter – set decorator

The East is directed by Zal Batmanglij. He co-wrote the screenplay with Brit Marling, who also stars in the film. Batmanglij and Marling also wrote the screenplay for Sound of My Voice and went to Los Angeles in 2009 to produce a film. Due to the economy, they could not make the film that year. They were then inspired by the concept of Buy Nothing Day, an international day of protest against consumerism, and decided to experience a Buy Nothing summer. They spent two months in 2009 with proponents of freeganism, which is a practice of eating "discarded food in their pursuit of a moneyless existence". Marling said, "We wanted to have some adventure, and we didn't have any money. We learned to hop trains, we learned to sleep on rooftops, we learned to claim the space that feels so private. We joined this anarchist collective." The pair drew from their experiences as well as thriller films like All The President's Men, The Bourne Identity and Michael Clayton to craft The East, which they wrote before they began filming Sound of My Voice for a 2011 release.

Batmanglij and Marling wrote to have the anarchist organization target a multinational corporation instead of a government. Marling said, "Multinational corporations are outside of the purview of any nation-state. These are the entities that are shaping and running the world... The modern anarchy movement is about rebelling against the corporate structure." Batmanglij said the film focused on the pharmaceutical industry due to the writers hearing stories about the side effects of drugs, such as a drug to help quit smoking that resulted in some people committing suicide. He said they considered focusing on banks due to the 2008 financial crisis, but they chose the pharmaceutical industry so the mission in the film would have emotional resonance. They titled the film The East to make a variety of references. The director explained, "'The East' is ... the East Coast, which is like something in our American collective consciousness—New England, tony, center of power. The Wicked Witch of the East in the Oz mythology was the bad witch because the book was about how the Midwest was getting screwed over by the east, by Washington. And then of course we have the Middle East or the Far East, which is seen as different or other. The ultimate Other. So, it's funny that this word means two things, and I thought that was an interesting name for a resistance group that is combined of kids from New England who want to make themselves the Other."

Sound of My Voice, directed by Batmanglij and starring Marling, screened at the 2011 Sundance Film Festival in January. Producer Michael Costigan, who liked Sound of My Voice, got a copy of the screenplay for The East. Costigan liked the screenplay and approached Batmanglij to say that he and his fellow producers Ridley Scott and Tony Scott at Scott Free Productions were interested in making the film. After the festival, Fox Searchlight Pictures acquired distribution rights for Sound of My Voice and Another Earth (also starring Marling). In the process, the distributor greenlighted production of The East. By September 2011, Marling and Alexander Skarsgård were cast in the starring roles. Felicity Jones was attached to play Izzy, but she dropped out to promote Like Crazy. Jones was replaced by Elliot Page.

Production of the film, which had a budget of $6.5 million, took place in Shreveport, Louisiana. Production designer Alex DiGerlando converted an alternative lifestyle club in Shreveport into a house for The East. The club was originally painted black and gold, and it was repainted different shades of green for the film. Filming took place in late 2011; Batmanglij said it lasted 26 days.

The director compared the film's ambivalent ending to the one in the 2002 film 25th Hour: "I feel like it's almost as if the film’s events never happened at its end... It's sort of like what we're all capable of if we put our minds to it. There's a lot of work that needs to be done in order to make changes, even for her to make changes."

== Release ==
=== Screenings ===
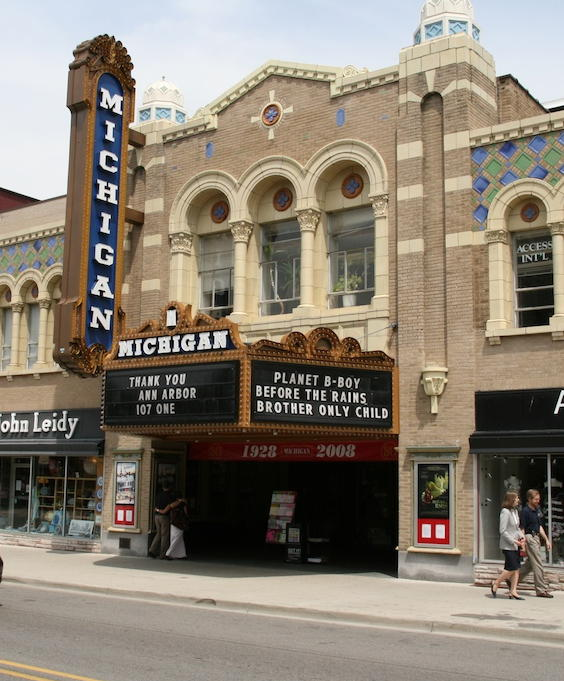
One of The East's early screenings was at the Michigan Theater

The film premiered at the 2013 Sundance Film Festival on January 20, 2013. The Sundance Institute, as part of their Sundance Film Festival USA program, screened The East at the Michigan Theater in Ann Arbor, Michigan on January 31, 2013. Over 1,300 people were in attendance for the screening, and Zal Batmanglij and Brit Marling showed for a Q&A session. Leading up to its theatrical release in May 2013, The East was chosen as the closing night film of the South by Southwest (SXSW) Film Conference and Festival, and went on to screen at the Phoenix Film Festival, Seattle International Film Festival, and the San Francisco International Film Festival. The Washington Post reported that Q&A sessions after the film's screenings were popular. It said, "Filmgoers might not have agreed on their feelings about 'The East,' but they had one thing in common: They needed to talk about it." According to Batmanglij, the Sundance screening retained 98% of the audience for its Q&A session.

The East had its New York City premiere on May 20, 2013. It was released in four theaters in Los Angeles and New York City on May 31, 2013. The film grossed $77,031 over the opening weekend, a theater average of $19,258. Indiewire reported, "That's a strong number in general and also a big step up from Batmanglij and Marling's previous collaboration." TheWrap said the film had a strong start, while Box Office Mojo said it "opened to modest results". In its second weekend, the release was expanded to 41 theaters. It grossed $228,561 over the weekend. Overall, it grossed $2.4 million.

=== Critical response ===
The Wall Street Journal reported that at the Sundance Film Festival, the film "opened to mostly strong reviews". Variety's Justin Chang reviewed the film, "This clever, involving spy drama builds to a terrific level of intrigue before losing some steam in its second half." He noted that, "the appreciable growth in filmmaking confidence here should translate into a fine return on Fox Searchlight's investment". John DeFore, writing for The Hollywood Reporter, described The East as "a social-conscience espionage film that has actually thought about its 'eco-terrorism' themes beyond figuring out how to mine them for suspense". He said, "Batmanglij balances emotional tension with practical danger nicely, a must in a story whose activist protagonists can make no distinction between the personal and the political." Joe Neumaier of the New York Daily News gave The East 5 stars and highlighted it as a Sundance standout. He said the film felt like a "sophisticated" Earth First! take of The Parallax View and other 1970s films with the theme of paranoia.

Logan Hill, reviewing for indieWire, said, "Fast-paced and energetic, The East hits a beat and hurries along to the next Jam. As slickly paced as a big-studio espionage movie, it nearly succeeds as a pure adrenaline-rush thriller. In the end, the problem isn't that there's too much plot, but rather a certain dramatic illogic." Hill commended the cast and said of the direction, "Batmanglij has a particular talent for capturing that unmoored, twentysomething search for meaning, and the tight-knit allure of a group that offers a reason for living. But the film is so plot-driven, those don't have much room to breathe."

Following the film's release in May, the film review aggregation website Metacritic surveyed 36 critics and assessed 26 reviews to be positive, nine to be mixed, and one to be negative. It gave an aggregate score of 68 out of 100, which it said indicated "generally favorable reviews". Another review aggregator, Rotten Tomatoes, surveyed 147 critics and, categorizing the reviews as positive or negative, gave the film a score of 77% and summarized the critical consensus, "Tense, thoughtful, and deftly paced, The East is a political thriller that never loses sight of the human element."

=== Home media ===
The East was released on DVD and Blu-ray Disc in the United States on September 17, 2013 and in the UK on November 5, 2013.

== See also ==
- Eco-terrorism in fiction
- Hunted, a television series about an operative for a private intelligence company
- The Company You Keep, a film about a former Weatherman who lives in hiding from the FBI for over 30 years
