= List of films at the 2010 Sundance Film Festival =

The following films were shown at the 2010 Sundance Film Festival.

== Documentary ==
- 12th and Delaware
- A Small Act
- Bhutto
- Casino Jack and the United States of Money
- Family Affair
- Freedom Riders
- Gasland
- Jean-Michel Basquiat: The Radiant Child
- Joan Rivers: A Piece of Work
- Lucky
- My Perestroika
- The Oath
- Restrepo
- Russian Lessons
- Smash His Camera
- The Tillman Story
- Waiting for "Superman"

== World Cinema - Documentary ==
- Enemies of the People
- A Film Unfinished (German: Shtikat Haarchion)
- His & Hers
- Kick in Iran
- Last Train Home (Chinese: 歸途列車)
- The Red Chapel (Danish: Det røde kapel)
- Russian Lessons
- Secrets of the Tribe
- Sins of My Father (Spanish: Pecados de mi padre)
- Space Tourists
- Waste Land

== World Cinema - Dramatic ==
- All That I Love (Polish: Wszystko, co kocham)
- Animal Kingdom
- Boy
- Four Lions
- Grown Up Movie Star
- The Man Next Door (Spanish: El hombre de al lado)
- Me Too (Spanish: Yo, también)
- Nuummioq
- Peepli Live
- Son of Babylon(Arabic: ابن بابل)
- Southern District (Spanish: Zona sur)
- The Temptation of St. Tony (Estonian: Püha Tõnu kiusamine)
- Undertow (Spanish: Contracorriente)
- Vegetarian (Korean: Chaesikjuuija)

== Dramatic ==
- 3 Backyards
- Blue Valentine
- Douchebag
- The Dry Land
- Happythankyoumoreplease
- Winter's Bone
- Hesher
- Holy Rollers
- Howl
- The Imperialists Are Still Alive!
- Lovers of Hate
- Night Catches Us
- Obselidia
- Skateland
- Sympathy for Delicious
- Welcome to the Rileys

== Premieres ==
- Abel
- Cane Toads: The Conquest
- The Company Men
- Cyrus
- The Extra Man
- Get Low
- Jack Goes Boating
- The Kids Are All Right
- The Killer Inside Me
- Nowhere Boy
- Please Give
- The Runaways
- The Shock Doctrine
- Twelve

== NEXT ==
- Arrmless
- Bass Ackwards
- Bilal's Stand
- The Freebie
- Homewrecker
- New Low
- One Too Many Mornings
- The Taqwacores

== Midnight ==
- 7 Days
- Buried
- Frozen
- High School
- The Perfect Host
- Splice
- Tucker & Dale vs. Evil
- The Violent Kind

== Spotlight ==
=== Narrative ===
- A Prophet
- Bran Nue Dae
- Daddy Longlegs
- Enter the Void
- I Am Love
- Hilarious
- Lourdes
- Mother and Child
- New African Cinema (A collection of short films from multiple countries by Wanuri Kahiu, Dyana Gaye and Jenna Bass)
- Women Without Men

=== Documentary ===
- 8: The Mormon Proposition
- Catfish
- Climate Refugees
- Countdown to Zero
- Life 2.0
- Teenage Paparazzo
- To Catch a Dollar: Muhammad Yunus Banks on America
- Winning Time: Reggie Miller vs. The New York Knicks

== New Frontier ==
- All My Friends Are Funeral Singers
- Double Take
- Memories of Overdevelopment
- ODDSAC
- Pepperminta
- Utopia in Four Movements
