= Another Earth (soundtrack) =

Another Earth (Music from the Motion Picture)

Film score by Fall On Your Sword
- Released: July 19, 2011
- Recorded: 2010–2011
- Genre: Film score
- Length: 54:11
- Labels: Milan Records; Fox Music
- Producer: Lucy Alper

Fall On Your Sword chronology
Aardvark (2010)	Another Earth (2011)	Lola Versus (2012)

Another Earth (Music from the Motion Picture) is the score album to the 2011 film of the same name directed by Mike Cahill. The score is written and composed by former LCD Soundsystem band members, Phil Mossman and Will Bates, and produced by Lucy Alper. Although, they had credited Bates' music production company Fall On Your Sword for the soundtrack. The score was released by Milan Records and Fox Music on July 19, 2011, three days before the film's release.

== Development ==
Cahill met the band members, with the suggestion of the film's producer Tyler Brodie, a manager of DFA Records. What Cahill loved about the sound is it combined the science of "cool, pulsating, electronic vibe" with the organic and textured human story. They worked for nearly five months on the score, with Cahill giving more creative freedom to their work. Brit Marling, also praised their work saying "Their music got to things in the story that we as actors didn’t even find. When you see that image of Jupiter at the beginning and that music, oh my gosh, that’s the coolest thing about making films. You don’t do it alone. You do it with so many artists and they all do it so brilliantly."

The film featured a song in the musical saw sequence, which was not composed by the band, but by Scott Munson, and was performed by Natalia Paruz. Cahill came upon Paruz, known also as the "Saw Lady", while riding the subway in New York. Mesmerized by her playing, he obtained her contact information and arranged for her to coach William Mapother on how to hold and act as if playing the saw for the scene in the film.

== Reception ==
Blow The Scene gave the album 7.4 from a score of 10 and wrote: "This is a solid debut for the duo, and we’re definitely looking forward to hearing more. There are strengths that lie in the myriad of styles, but perhaps with future releases, the tracks will be wrapped together in a neater package, without needing the context of visuals to complete the listening experience." Daniel Schweiger of Assignment X wrote "With Another Earth, Fall On Your Sword makes us hear the bigger cosmic mysteries the film itself neglects to indulge in, all as heard through a haunted, human perspective. Better yet, you still get the electro-groove ear candy that’s been the stuff of space travel since United Planets’ Cruiser C57-D touched down on Altair IV. Here, it's the score that truly takes off towards tender imagination."

Jon Doyle of Various Small Flames wrote that soundtrack "really has that classic space feel without coming across as cliché. Parts of it seem like a modern, fleshed out take on the work of Ursula Bogner." Ian Freer of Empire, Tasha Robinson of The A. V. Club called the score as "ambient" and "atmospheric indie" and "celestial".

== Track listing ==
The original soundtrack was released by Milan Records on July 19, 2011, three days before the film. It consisted of 19 tracks from the original score.

Another Earth (Music from the Motion Picture)
No.	Title	Length
1.	"The First Time I Saw Jupiter"	2:54
2.	"Bob The Robot"	1:12
3.	"The Specialist / Am I Alone?"	4:52
4.	"Naked On The Ice"	1:46
5.	"Rhoda's Theme"	5:54
6.	"The House Theme"	1:22
7.	"The End Of The World"	1:54
8.	"Rhoda's Application"	1:37
9.	"Making Contact"	1:15
10.	"I Am Over There"	4:14
11.	"Purdeep's Theme"	4:22
12.	"The Cosmonaut"	2:01
13.	"The Specialist / Look At Ourselves"	3:59
14.	"Sonatina In D Minor" (Phaedon Papadopoulos)	1:18
15.	"Rhoda's Theme / Returning to John"	3:50
16.	"Forgive"	2:39
17.	"Love Theme"	1:58
18.	"The Other You"	1:43
19.	"The First Time I Saw Jupiter / End titles"	5:21
Total length:		54:11

== Extended play ==
An extended play that consisted "Purdeep's Theme" and a 10-minute remix of the track by Fall On Your Sword was released on February 28, 2020.

Purdeep's Theme (EP)
No.	Title	Length
1.	"Purdeep's Theme (Fall On Your Sword Remix)"	10:14
2.	"Purdeep's Theme"	4:22
Total length:		14:36

== Credits ==
Credits adapted from CD liner notes.

- Cello – Eric Jacobsen
- Graphic design – Shawn Lyon
- Executive producer – Jean-Christophe Chamboredon, Stefan Karrer
- Liner Notes – Mike Cahill
- Music business and legal affairs – Roya Melamed
- Mastered By – Ken Heitmueller
- Performers – Phil Mossman, Will Bates
- Viola, violin – Lev 'Ljova' Zhurbin
- Vocals – Inna Barmash
- Writers – Fall On Your Sword, Phaedon Papadopoulos
