= I Origins =

2014 film by Mike Cahill

- Theatrical release poster
- Directed by: Mike Cahill
- Written by: Mike Cahill
- Produced by: Mike Cahill; Hunter Gray; Alex Orlovsky
- Starring: Michael Pitt; Brit Marling; Àstrid Bergès-Frisbey
- Cinematography: Markus Forderer
- Edited by: Mike Cahill
- Music by: Will Bates; Phil Mossman
- Production companies: Verisimilitude; WeWork Studios; Bersin Pictures; Penny Jane Films
- Distributed by: Fox Searchlight Pictures
- Release dates: January 18, 2014 (Sundance); July 18, 2014 (United States)
- Running time: 106 minutes
- Country: United States
- Language: English
- Budget: $1 million
- Box office: $852,399

I Origins is a 2014 American science fiction romantic drama film written and directed by Mike Cahill. The independent production premiered at the 2014 Sundance Film Festival on January 18, 2014. It is distributed by Fox Searchlight Pictures, and opened in limited release on July 18, 2014. It won the Best Feature Length Film Award at the Festival Internacional de Cinema Fantàstic de Catalunya on October 11, 2014.

== Plot ==
A Ph.D. student, Ian Gray, is researching the evolution of the eye with research partner, Kenny, and first-year lab assistant, Karen. At a Halloween party Gray encounters Sofi, a young woman masked with only hazel-speckled, ash-blue eyes visible. She later leads him into the washroom to have sex before abruptly leaving.

Mysterious synchronicities, like the recurring number 11, guide Gray to a billboard on which he recognizes Sofi's eyes. Eventually he sees her on a train. They begin a relationship being deeply in love, despite Ian's hard rationalism in sharp contrast with Sofi's fey spirituality. Ian tells Sofi that he has always been in love with her, saying that before the Big Bang his atoms were once with hers, and that his atoms have always loved her atoms. One day they spontaneously agree to marry but must wait a day for a license. Disappointed, they walk out of the registry office. Ian gets a call from Karen who says she has found a blind worm—Eisenia fetida—with the DNA necessary to develop an eye. An ecstatic Ian takes Sofi to the lab with him.

Karen leaves while Sofi is upset by the research they are doing, saying he is playing God. Ian accidentally splashes his eyes with formaldehyde and asks Sofi to call Karen, who administers first aid. Sofi takes Ian home but on the way up, the elevator gets stuck between floors. Ian removes his eye bandages to be able to pull himself onto the next floor, but Sofi is scared and hesitates. When Ian finally convinces her to be pulled up, the elevator abruptly begins moving and Ian is terrified when he realizes her lower half has been chopped off. Ian goes into a depression and avoids work and his friends but Karen is finally able to get him to agree to meet her, when they end up kissing.

The film flashes forward seven years. Ian has written an eye evolution book and is now married to a pregnant Karen. Ian still has feelings for Sofi that are combined with the guilt he feels for her death. Karen catches him masturbating at what she thought was pornography but she realizes he was actually looking at old videos of Sofi. They start to discuss the circumstances surrounding her death, in which Karen suggests Sofi would still be alive and together with Ian if she hadn't called him to the lab that day, but Ian admits his final thought before the elevator accident was regretting being stuck with the childish Sofi for the rest of his life. The both of them kiss and accept they both have their own guilt to live with.

When their baby is born, the hospital takes an iris scan of baby Tobias's eyes. The results are entered in the database and the program identifies the baby as a certain Paul Edgar Dairy. The nurse re-enters the results, thinking it is a glitch, and the problem disappears. A few months later, a Dr. Simmons calls, recommending further testing the baby because she says he may be showing signs of autism. The test involves seemingly random photographs, but Ian and Karen become suspicious. He tracks the pictures from the test to Idaho and the family of Paul Edgar Dairy, who had died just before their baby was conceived.

Kenny is now creator of the iris scan database used to store Tobias's scan, and Kenny reveals that Dr. Simmons is in fact one of only five people with full access to the database. As a test, he helps Ian and Karen run some photos of deceased family members, plus various other people's eyes through the database to see if there are any other recent matches. They get a hit for Sofi, whose iris scan matches one made in India just three months prior, years after Sofi's death.

Ian goes to India to find the subject of this scan, an orphan girl named Salomina. With help from Priya Varma, he spends weeks searching and putting up billboards. Eventually he finds the little girl staring at the billboard. He takes Salomina back to his hotel and contacts Karen over Skype. The two of them conduct a simple test designed to reveal if Salomina might be somehow linked with Sofi's memories. The results match the probable range of random chance, with a 44% success score. Feeling somewhat disheartened, Ian intends to take Salomina to Priya. But when they reach the elevator, the moment the doors open Salomina panics and throws herself into his arms, too frightened to enter. Staring into each other's eyes with a certain recognition, they then cling to each other, tears streaming down both their faces. He picks her up and takes her down the stairs instead, with Salomina tightly gripping his neck, till they walk from the dark interior and step out into the light.

A post-credits scene shows Dr. Simmons scanning the irises of famous deceased figures finding many such matches.

== Cast ==
- Michael Pitt as Ian Gray
- Brit Marling as Karen
- Àstrid Bergès-Frisbey as Sofi Elizondo
- Steven Yeun as Kenny
- Archie Panjabi as Priya Varma
- Cara Seymour as Dr. Janet Simmons
- Venida Evans as Margaret Dairy
- William Mapother as Darryl Mackenzie
- Kashish Kumari as Salomina
- Ako as Nurse

== Production ==
I Origins was the second feature film by writer-director Mike Cahill after his earlier independent science fiction-drama, Another Earth (2011), also with actress Brit Marling. Cahill sold the film rights to Another Earth to Fox Searchlight Pictures at the 2011 Sundance Film Festival. At that time he also sold a screenplay to what would be his next feature film titled I. Though during the development of I, after failing to "crack" some aspects of the story, Cahill instead decided to make an origin story for the film, in which he had a "rich back story for".

Although Fox Searchlight owned the rights to any prequels or sequels to the I script, Cahill decided to make I Origins independently. He intended to sell the film at the Sundance Film Festival, like he did for Another Earth. Fox Searchlight agreed and the film was produced by Verisimilitude and WeWork Studios in association with Bersin Pictures and Penny Jane Films. After the premiere of I Origins at the 2014 Sundance Film Festival, Fox Searchlight ended up buying the rights to the film.

== Music ==
The soundtrack was released by Milan Records on July 15, 2014.

== Release ==
I Origins premiered at the 2014 Sundance Film Festival on January 18, 2014. Shortly after, Fox Searchlight Pictures acquired worldwide distribution rights to the film. The film won the festival's Alfred P. Sloan Prize, which recognizes films that depict science and technology. The win was Cahill's second; his film Another Earth also won the prize in 2011. I Origins also screened at the Brooklyn-based BAMcinemaFest and at the Nantucket Film Festival, both in late June 2014.

I Origins began its limited theatrical release on July 18, 2014 in just four theaters. The following week, it expanded to 76 theaters.

== Reception ==
I Origins received mixed reviews from critics. Rotten Tomatoes gave the film a rating of 51%, based on 105 reviews, with a weighted average score of 6/10. The site's consensus states: "Writer-director Mike Cahill remains an intriguingly ambitious talent, but with the uneven sci-fi drama I Origins, his reach exceeds his grasp". On Metacritic, the film has a score of 57 out of 100, based on 36 critics, indicating "mixed or average" reviews. Jordan Zakarin, of entertainment and media news website TheWrap, said that "The movie starts as a love story and then morphs into a thriller, propelled always by the push and pull of faith and logic, with tragedy shifting world views over time". He continued, saying that "The message is both micro and macro, aimed at the renewed war in the United States over issues like science education and contraception, as well as Cahill's way of working out his own mixed emotions".

== Planned sequel ==
I Origins was developed as a prequel to I, a screenplay which Cahill sold to Fox Searchlight Pictures in 2011. Cahill intended for I to take place twenty years after the event of I Origins, after the repercussions of Dr. Ian Gray's discoveries take hold, as teased in the post-credits of the film.

During press interviews for the film, Cahill spoke of plans to go ahead with a sequel to I Origins, saying "There's a sequel in the works. It's not scripted. We're not in production yet, but we set up at Fox Searchlight".

== See also ==
- Afghan Girl
- Iris recognition
- Irreducible complexity

Awards
Preceded by Computer Chess	Alfred P. Sloan Prize Winner; 2013	Succeeded by The Stanford Prison Experiment
