= Dust and Bones =

Dust and Bones may refer to:

- "Dust and Bones", an episode from season 13 of the television show Criminal Minds
- Dust and Bones, the debut solo album by Cary Ann Hearst
- "Dust N' Bones", a song by Guns N' Roses on the album Use Your Illusion I
- Of Dust and Bones, a film directed by Diane Bell
