= 2011 Independent Spirit Awards =

The 2011 Independent Spirit Awards can refer to:

- 26th Independent Spirit Awards, a ceremony held in 2011, honoring the films of 2010
- 27th Independent Spirit Awards, a ceremony held in 2012, honoring the films of 2011
