= ScreenAnarchy =

Canadian film review website

- Website type: Film news; film criticism
- Available in: English
- Creator: Todd Brown
- Website: screenanarchy.com
- Launched: 2004; 22 years ago
- Current status: Active

ScreenAnarchy, previously known as Twitch Film or Twitch, is an English-language website featuring news and reviews of mainly international, independent and cult films. The website was founded in 2004 by Todd Brown. In addition to films, the website covers various film festivals from Sundance, Toronto and Fantasia to Sitges, Cannes and the Berlinale. They partnered with Instinctive Film in 2011 to found Interactor, a crowdfunding and viral marketing site, and with Indiegogo in 2013. Brown is a partner at XYZ Films, and Variety credits Twitch Film as helping to popularize the production company's films.

In 2008, Bloody Disgusting wrote that Twitch "quickly established itself as the online world's leading source for international, independent, cult, arthouse and genre film news, review and discussion". He also wrote: "Over the years I have become increasingly impressed by what Todd Brown has done with Twitch Film, he has cornered the market for all edgy international releases and has given life to foreign films that might never have seen the light here in the States". Ain't It Cool News has linked to Twitch Film pages and UGO Networks quoted a Twitch editor among its list of "critics" at its appearance at Sundance 2010.
