= 1991 University of Iowa shooting =

Mass shooting in Iowa City, Iowa, U.S.

- Location: 41.6622°N 91.5324°W; Iowa City, Iowa, U.S.
- Date: November 1, 1991; 3:42 – 3:52 p.m. (CST)
- Attack type: Spree shooting; school shooting; mass murder; murder-suicide, mass shooting
- Weapons: Taurus .38-caliber revolver; Jennings J-22 .22-caliber semi-automatic pistol (unused)
- Deaths: 6 (including the perpetrator)
- Injuries: 1
- Perpetrator: Gang Lu

The University of Iowa shooting was a mass shooting that occurred in Iowa City, Iowa, United States, on November 1, 1991. Gang Lu, a 28-year-old former graduate student at the University of Iowa, killed three members of the Physics and Astronomy Department faculty, an Associate Vice President for Academic Affairs, and a fellow student, then seriously injured another student working at the university's campus, before committing suicide. It is the deadliest school shooting in Iowa history.

== Shooting ==
On Friday, November 1, 1991, Gang Lu attended a meeting for the theoretical space plasma physics research group in Room 309 on the third floor of Van Allen Hall on the university's campus. A few minutes after the meeting began, Lu shot three attendees of the meeting with a .38 Special revolver, then proceeded to the second floor to shoot the chairman of the department in his office. Lu then returned to the third floor and shot the three initial victims again, which killed Robert A. Smith, who had only been wounded by the first round of bullets. Those who were shot in Van Allen Hall were:

- Christoph K. Goertz, professor of physics and astronomy, Lu's dissertation chairman and one of America's leading theoretical space plasma physicists
- Robert A. Smith, associate professor of physics and astronomy, also on Lu's dissertation committee
- Linhua Shan (simplified Chinese: 山林华; traditional Chinese: 山林華; pinyin: Shān Línhuá), a post-doctoral research investigator and the winner of the Spriestersbach prize; Shan had once been Lu's roommate
- Dwight R. Nicholson, chairman of the physics and astronomy department, and one of Lu's dissertation committee members

After the shootings at Van Allen Hall, Lu walked three blocks to Jessup Hall located in the University of Iowa's Pentacrest. Upon entering the building, Lu made his way to the second floor and entered Room 208, the office of T. Anne Cleary, where he shot her in the head. At the time of the shooting, Cleary was the Associate Vice President for Academic Affairs, as well as a university grievance officer. Lu had recently filed several grievances about his dissertation not being nominated for the prestigious Spriestersbach prize. Cleary subsequently died the following day at the University of Iowa Hospital.

Lu then shot Miya Rodolfo-Sioson, a 23-year-old temporary student employee in the Office of Academic Affairs in Jessup Hall, for unknown reasons. Rodolfo-Sioson survived, but was left paralyzed from the neck down and died years later from inflammatory breast cancer on December 3, 2008. Lu had intended to kill university president Hunter Rawlings III, but he was attending the Iowa/Ohio State football game in Columbus, Ohio, at the time. Gang Lu was found in room 203 of Jessup Hall with a self-inflicted gunshot wound to the head. Lu died shortly after police arrived. He discharged a total of 16 bullets during the mass killing, including the suicide shot.

== Perpetrator ==
Gang Lu

Gang Lu (Chinese: 卢刚; pinyin: Lú Gāng; July 30, 1963 – November 1, 1991), was a 28-year-old Chinese graduate student at the University of Iowa who had received his doctoral degree in physics and astronomy from the university in May 1991. When he was 18 years old, Lu began studying physics at Peking University in Beijing, where he passed the CUSPEA exam in 1984 and was admitted to study in the United States, becoming a graduate student at the University of Iowa. As a graduate student, Lu was primarily a loner who was perceived by at least one other graduate student to have a psychological problem if challenged and was reported to have had abusive tantrums. Lu was infuriated because his dissertation, titled Study of the "Critical Ionization Velocity" Effect by Particle-in-Cell Simulation, did not receive the prestigious D. C. Spriestersbach Dissertation Prize, which included a monetary award of $2,500. The Tiananmen Square protests of 1989 led many Chinese students to become eager to stay in the United States, and Lu believed that winning the prize would have made it easier for him to get a job and not have to return to China. Normally, Lu would have received a postdoctoral researcher position, but there was not enough money to support him.

In the months prior to the shooting, Lu was still living in Iowa City and had written five letters explaining the reasons for his planned mass shooting. According to university officials, four of the five letters were written in English, and one was written in Chinese. All five letters were intended to be mailed to news organizations and have never been released to the public. However, Edwin Chen's book Deadly Scholarship includes a statement by Lu intended to be read after his attack and suicide, which Laura Hamlett characterized as a manifesto; and, in translation, a letter by Lu to his sister.

== Media adaptations ==
Writer Jo Ann Beard wrote an acclaimed personal essay based in part on the killings. Her essay, entitled "The Fourth State of Matter", was originally published in The New Yorker in June 1996. It appeared in the 1997 edition of Best American Essays. The essay was later included in her collection of personal essays, The Boys of My Youth. Beard worked as an editor for a physics journal at the university and was a colleague of the victims. She had been close friends with Goertz.

Loosely based on Gang Lu's story, Chinese director Chen Shi-zheng made a feature film, Dark Matter, starring Liu Ye and Meryl Streep. However, the story in Dark Matter has substantial differences in plot and character motivation. The film won the Alfred P. Sloan Prize at the Sundance Film Festival in 2007.

The educational series Discovering Psychology, "Cultural Psychology" (episode 26, updated edition) discusses Gang Lu (at the 3:50 minute mark).

A documentary about the life of the lone survivor, Miya Rodolfo-Sioson, entitled Miya of the Quiet Strength, was released in 2009.

== See also ==
- List of school shootings in the United States by death toll
