= 26th Independent Spirit Awards =

US film awards ceremony in 2011

- Awarded for: Best in independent film
- Date: February 26, 2011
- Site: Santa Monica Pier; Santa Monica, California, U.S.
- Hosted by: Joel McHale

Highlights
- Best Feature: Black Swan
- Most awards: Black Swan (4)
- Most nominations: Winter's Bone (7)

Television coverage
- Channel: IFC

The 26th Independent Spirit Awards, honoring the best independent films of 2010, were presented on February 26, 2011. The nominations were announced on November 30, 2010. The ceremony was hosted by Joel McHale.

== Winners and nominees ==
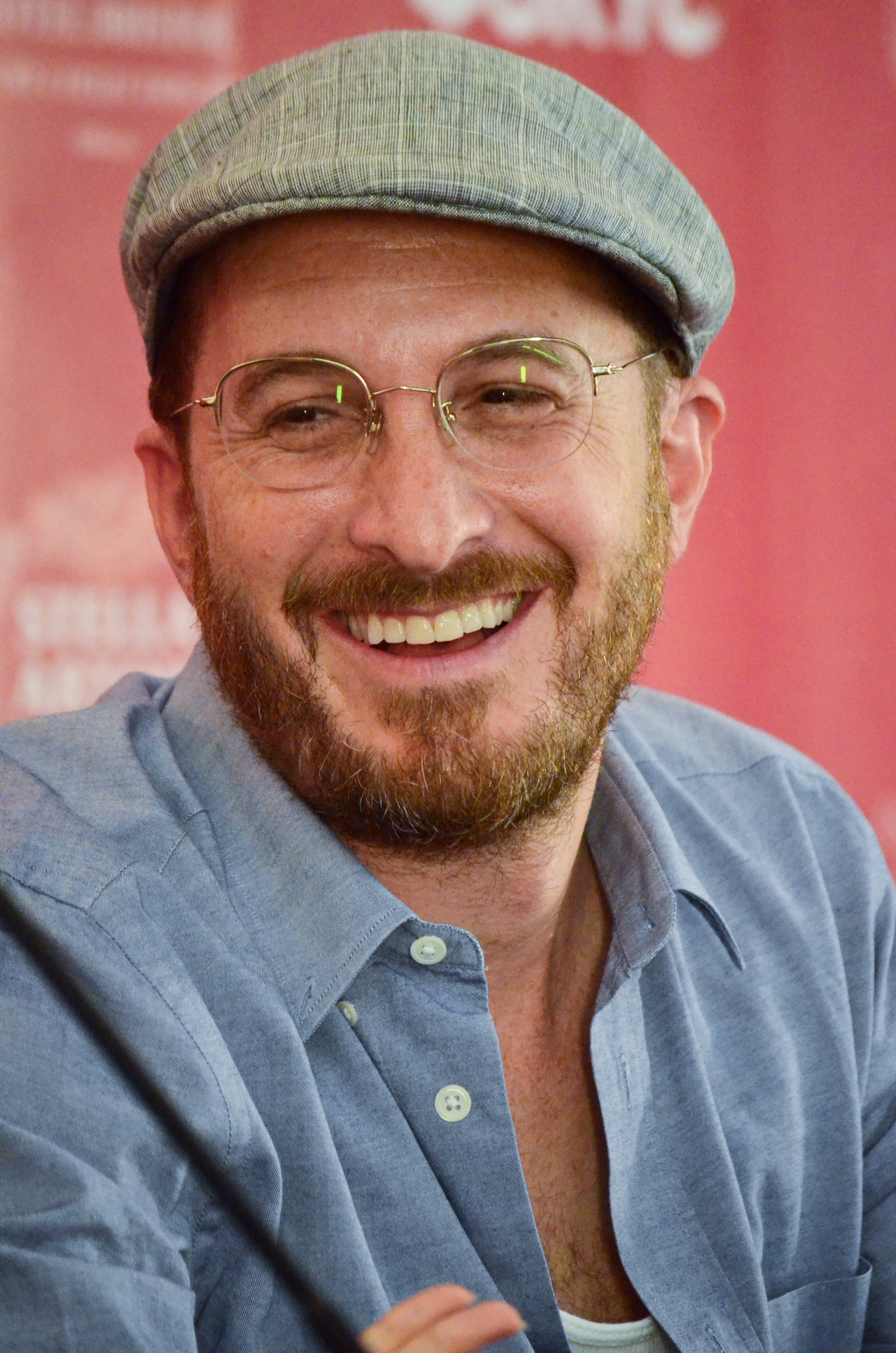
Darren Aronofsky, Best Director winner.

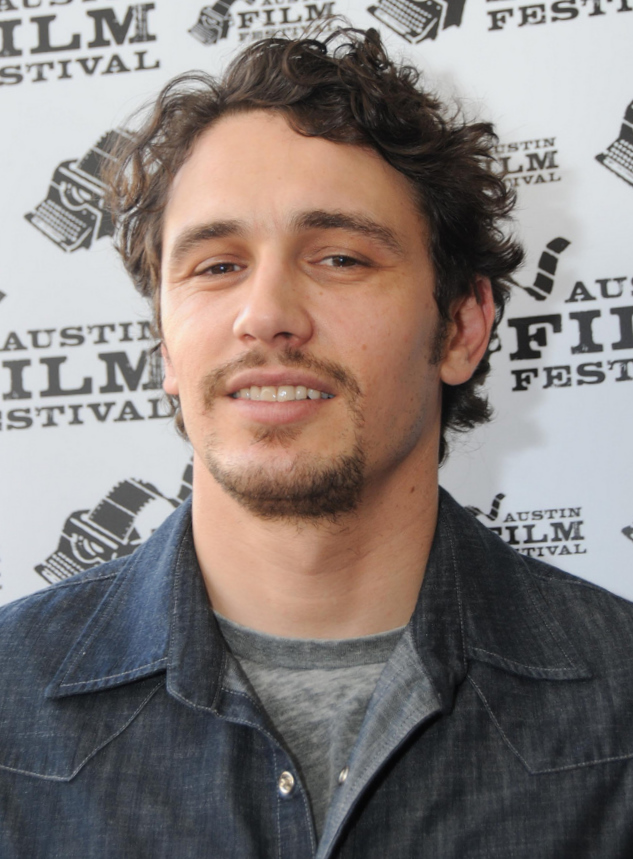
James Franco, Best Male Lead winner.

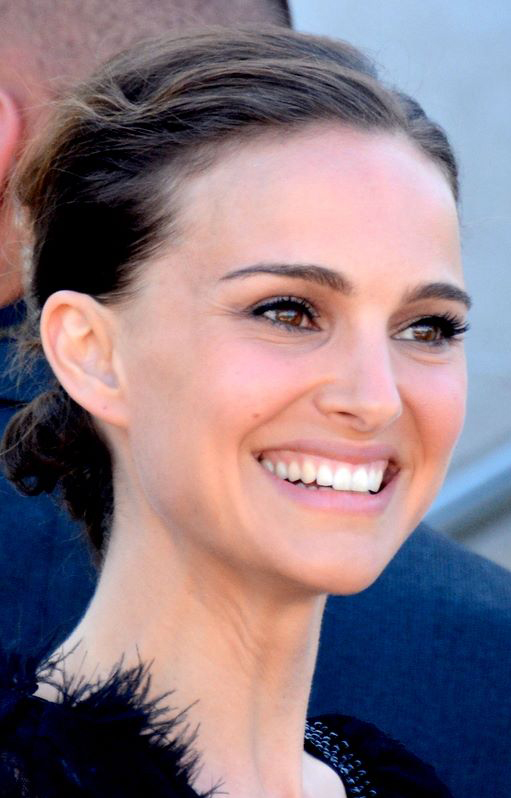
Natalie Portman, Best Female Lead winner.

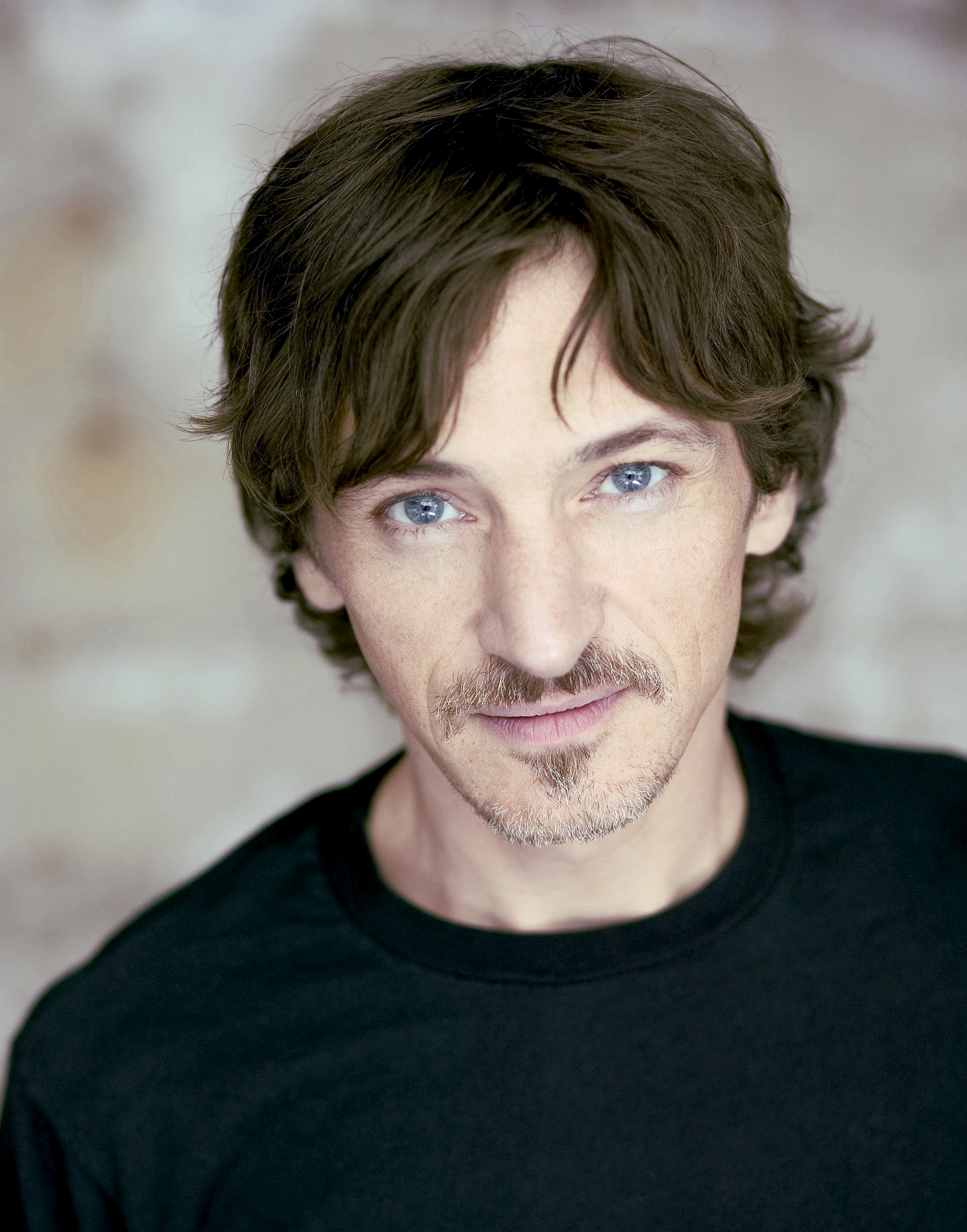
John Hawkes, Best Supporting Male winner.

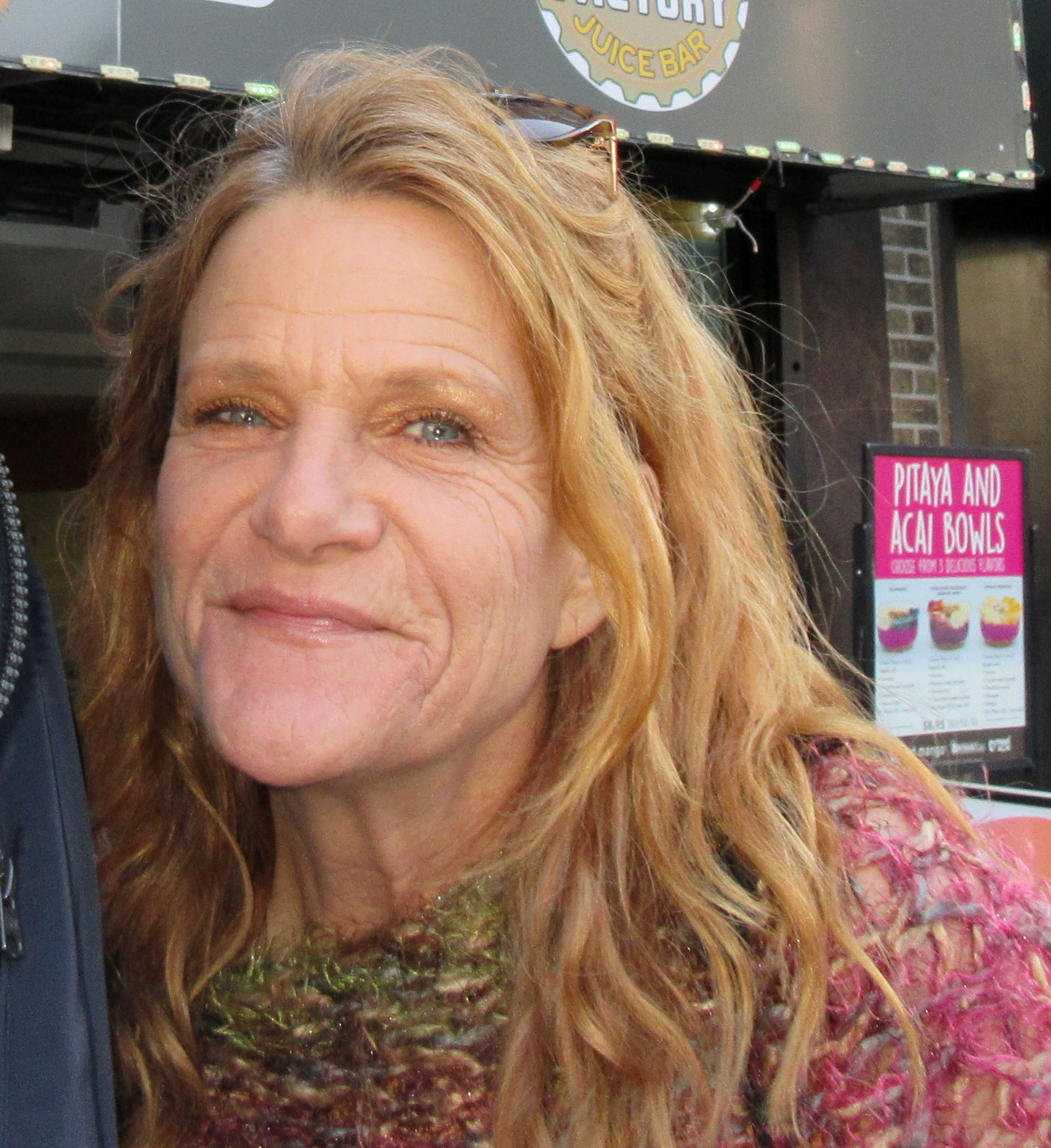
Dale Dickey, Best Supporting Female winner.

Best Feature	Best Director
Black Swan: 127 Hours; Greenberg; The Kids Are All Right; Winter's Bone	Darren Aronofsky – Black Swan: Danny Boyle – 127 Hours; Lisa Cholodenko – The Kids Are All Right; Debra Granik – Winter's Bone; John Cameron Mitchell – Rabbit Hole
Best Male Lead	Best Female Lead
James Franco – 127 Hours: Ronald Bronstein – Daddy Longlegs; Aaron Eckhart – Rabbit Hole; John C. Reilly – Cyrus; Ben Stiller – Greenberg	Natalie Portman – Black Swan: Annette Bening – The Kids Are All Right; Greta Gerwig – Greenberg; Nicole Kidman – Rabbit Hole; Jennifer Lawrence – Winter's Bone; Michelle Williams – Blue Valentine
Best Supporting Male	Best Supporting Female
John Hawkes – Winter's Bone: Samuel L. Jackson – Mother and Child; Bill Murray – Get Low; John Ortiz – Jack Goes Boating; Mark Ruffalo – The Kids Are All Right	Dale Dickey – Winter's Bone: Ashley Bell – The Last Exorcism; Allison Janney – Life During Wartime; Daphne Rubin-Vega – Jack Goes Boating; Naomi Watts – Mother and Child
Best Screenplay	Best First Screenplay
Stuart Blumberg and Lisa Cholodenko – The Kids Are All Right: Debra Granik and Anne Rosellini – Winter's Bone; Nicole Holofcener – Please Give; David Lindsay-Abaire – Rabbit Hole; Todd Solondz – Life During Wartime	Lena Dunham – Tiny Furniture: Diane Bell – Obselidia; Nik Fackler – Lovely, Still; Robert Glaudini – Jack Goes Boating; Dana Adam Shapiro and Evan M. Wiener – Monogamy
Best First Feature	Best Documentary Feature
Get Low: Everything Strange and New; The Last Exorcism; Night Catches Us; Tiny Furniture	Exit Through the Gift Shop: Marwencol; Restrepo; Sweetgrass; Thunder Soul
Best Cinematography	Best Foreign Film
Matthew Libatique – Black Swan: Adam Kimmel – Never Let Me Go; Jody Lee Lipes – Tiny Furniture; Michael McDonough – Winter's Bone; Harris Savides – Greenberg	The King's Speech • United Kingdom: Kisses • Ireland; Mademoiselle Chambon • France; Of Gods and Men • France; Uncle Boonmee Who Can Recall His Past Lives • Thailand

=== Films with multiple nominations and awards ===
Films that received multiple nominations
Nominations	Film
7	Winter's Bone
5	The Kids Are All Right
4	Black Swan
4	Greenberg
4	Rabbit Hole
3	127 Hours
3	Jack Goes Boating
3	Tiny Furniture
2	Daddy Longlegs
2	Get Low
2	The Last Exorcism
2	Life During Wartime
2	Marwencol
2	Mother and Child
2	Obselidia
2	Sweetgrass

Films that won multiple awards
Awards	Film
4	Black Swan
2	Winter's Bone

== Special awards ==
=== John Cassavetes Award ===
Daddy Longlegs

- The Exploding Girl
- Lbs.
- Lovers of Hate
- Obselidia

=== Truer Than Fiction Award ===
Jeff Malmberg – Marwencol

- Ilisa Barbash and Lucien Castaing-Taylor – Sweetgrass
- Lynn True and Nelson Walker III – Summer Pasture

=== Piaget Producers Award ===
Anish Savjani – Meek's Cutoff

- In-Ah Lee – Au Revoir Taipei
- Adele Romanski – The Myth of the American Sleepover

=== Someone to Watch Award ===
Mike Ott – Littlerock

- Hossein Keshavarz – Dog Sweat
- Laurel Nakadate – The Wolf Knife

=== Robert Altman Award ===
- Please Give – Nicole Holofcener, Jeanne McCarthy, Ann Guilbert, Rebecca Hall, Catherine Keener, Amanda Peet, Oliver Platt, Lois Smith, and Sarah Steele
