= Dumb Money (soundtrack) =

Dumb Money (Original Motion Picture Soundtrack)

Soundtrack album by Will Bates and various artists
- Released: September 22, 2023
- Genre: Film soundtrack
- Length: 47:22
- Label: Milan
- Producer: Will Bates; Mark Batson; Susan Jacobs

Dumb Money (Original Motion Picture Soundtrack) is the soundtrack to the 2023 film of the same name directed by Craig Gillespie. Featuring original score composed by Will Bates, the album further accompanies needle-drops used in the film performed by Mark Batson, Kay Ro$e, Darko, See You Next Year and SASH and featured artists such as Kitty Dynamo, Boom Boom and Blake Yung. The soundtrack was released by Milan Records on September 22, 2023.

== Development ==
Gillespie enlisted Susan Jacobs as the music supervisor for the film. Jacobs wanted three songs that released during early 2020 and 2021, termed as the beginning of the GameStop movement and also setting back during the COVID-19 pandemic timeline. As she was tasked to design the soundtrack within the limited budget and resources, she needed an edgy sound that surrounded the hedge fund characters with Cardi B, Drake and Megan Thee Stallion providing those edgy vibes, and had contacted several hip-hop producers for licensing the music.

The 2020 hit single "WAP" by Cardi B was used in the script in the first place as "it was about getting people to understand the story and scenes". Securing the rights for "Savage" was considered to be challenging as "It was in the script because that was the big TikTok dance at the time. But we couldn’t license any Megan Thee Stallion masters at the time because there were legal issues going on with them. They were frozen." Despite that Stallion allowed the production to use the song.

Mark Batson, who was known for his collaboration with renowned artists, produced new versions of the songs "WAP" and "Savage" that felt greater than the original versions. Jacobs also worked with younger artists to collaborate for the new renditions who further performed some of the reworked songs from Batson's catalog. One of these includes Cardi B's "Lit Thot" which Batson re-wrote with Rob Bressler and performed with Boom Boom. The song plays as the stock company Robin Hood is introduced. Jacobs described the song to be hard to replace, as Gillespie suggested it to be raunchier and edgier, but was appropriate to represent the Robin Hood members.

Will Bates was roped in during the production, where he was suggested to perform separate cues for Dano's character, as he went more melodic with those sequences. While he started writing the film's music, an old friend showed him a rare instrument he saw online, which was "an esoteric synth that has a cassette deck attached to it and was originally intended to be used as a Japanese poetry trainer. The keys are laid out in an unfamiliar microtonal scale." As soon as he got the instrument, he started messing around it came up with the theme of "Roaring Kitty". He then suggested the idea to Gillespie, on incorporating horns and low brass that had the gritty sound of a coal miner's brass band evoking the struggles and triumphs of a working man. He ended up playing all the brass and woodwinds, which led to the imperfections that Gillespie found good against the film's electronic sonic palette.

== Track listing ==
No.	Title	Artist(s)	Length
1.	"Intro"		1:16
2.	"Roaring Kitty"		2:38
3.	"You Make Me Wanna Purr"	Mark Batson feat. Kitty Dynamo	2:24
4.	"Kitty Runs"		3:13
5.	"Stack It"	Kay Ro$e	3:36
6.	"LITT"	Mark Batson feat. Boom Boom	1:52
7.	"21"	Darko	2:15
8.	"Train"		2:19
9.	"Sarah"		2:29
10.	"Better Man"	Mark Batson feat. Blake Yung	3:54
11.	"Tennis"		2:54
12.	"OZ"	See You Next Year & SASH	2:17
13.	"I Say Hold"		2:03
14.	"Shutdown"		5:05
15.	"They're Holding"		2:34
16.	"The Hearing"		2:42
17.	"Run Naked"		2:31
18.	"Cheers Everyone"		1:20
Total length:			47:22

== Reception ==
Tim Grierson of Screen International commented that Bates aggressively emulates Trent Reznor and Atticus Ross' score for The Social Network (2010) with its "ominous undertones and icy keyboards". Siddhant Adlakha of Mashable, Ross Bonaime of Collider and Edward Douglas of Below the Line also opined the same, while Adlakha stated that the score had an "ominousness that matched its framing device". Tara Bennett of Paste wrote "Will Bates' synth-heavy score accentuates the techy vibe with a bit of a heist undertone throughout."

== Additional music ==
The songs which were featured in the film, but not in the soundtrack includes: "WAP" by Cardi B, a reworked version of "Savage" performed by Yodie Summers, "Humble" by Kendrick Lamar, "I'd Do Anything for Love (But I Won't Do That)" by Meat Loaf, "Seven Nation Army" by The White Stripes and "Boss" by Little Simz.
