= Bliss (2021 film) =

2021 American drama film

- Official poster
- Directed by: Mike Cahill
- Written by: Mike Cahill
- Produced by: James D. Stern
- Starring: Owen Wilson; Salma Hayek
- Cinematography: Markus Förderer
- Edited by: Troy Takaki
- Music by: Will Bates
- Production companies: Endgame Entertainment; Big Indie Pictures
- Distributed by: Amazon Studios
- Release date: February 5, 2021
- Running time: 103 minutes
- Country: United States
- Language: English

Bliss is a 2021 American drama film written and directed by Mike Cahill. It stars Owen Wilson and Salma Hayek, and follows a middle-aged man (Wilson), recently divorced and estranged, who suffers a psychotic break when he is fired from an unhappy job. Befriended by a homeless woman (Hayek), he gradually falls deeper into what appears to be drug addiction. He struggles to discern reality from fantasy. It was released on February 5, 2021, on Amazon Prime Video, and received mostly negative reviews from critics, who compared it unfavorably to The Matrix.

== Plot ==
Greg Wittle spends his work hours daydreaming and drawing. After he is called to his boss's office, forgetting his wallet on his desk, Greg's wallet glitches out. Greg discovers his medication cannot be refilled without a doctor represcribing it. After he is fired, he accidentally kills his boss and conceals the body before leaving the office for the bar across the street.

In the bar, he meets Isabel, who appears to know what he has done. She speaks about having created this world with unintended consequences. In exchange for doing her a favor, she telekinetically makes Greg's boss's death look like a suicide. After they leave the bar, a walking woman appears from nowhere multiple times. After Isabel sells Greg's cell phone, she takes him to a tented area. There, she offers him yellow crystals and teaches him how to manipulate the world telekinetically.

After an altercation at a roller rink in which he and Isabel telekinetically trip a bully, he watches police arrest the bully, only to discover himself in the back of the squad car. Greg is released and his daughter Emily searches for him.

While Isabel gets more crystals, Emily spots Greg on the street and attempts to rescue him. She gives him her phone number and asks him to call her. One day, he wakes up in Isabel's tent and finds her absent but sees his drawings out and tacked up. Greg finds Emily's phone number and calls her, but gets the answering machine. When he returns, Isabel is there, upset that he called Emily, asserting she is not real. Isabel decides she needs to prove what reality is to him. She plans to eject them both out of this "false" world using blue crystals.

After snorting the blue crystals, they wake up attached to a giant computer along with several others. He is told that he has been experiencing a simulation within a Brain Box created by Isabel to study alternate realities and their effects on the human brain.

Isabel reveals they are a couple in this world and takes Greg home, showing him his drawings were recreations of this setting. Greg does not remember this world, and Isabel says that after a long, dark period of poverty, most problems on Earth were eliminated, allowing humanity to flourish. Greg still has vivid memories of the simulation, but Isabel warns him it pulls tricks on the user.

A gala is thrown for the Brain Box. During the celebration, Greg wanders off and encounters a ghostly Emily, who implores him to come back to her. Isabel begins to see elements from the simulation leak into her view and hypothesizes they need to go back into the simulation and take more blue crystals in order to fully exit it.

Back within the simulation, Isabel gets more crystals, but commits a murder in the process. The police pursue them. At her tent, Isabel finds that there are only enough crystals for one of them to leave. Greg suggests Isabel kill him since he believes real people cannot die in the simulation, but hearing Emily, who has tracked him down, Greg insists Isabel go back alone, which she accepts.

Isabel distracts the police long enough for Greg to escape to a rehab clinic, admitting that he believes that his daughter Emily is real. Sometime later, Greg reconnects with Emily.

== Cast ==
- Owen Wilson as Greg Wittle
- Salma Hayek as Isabel Clemens
- Nesta Cooper as Emily Wittle
- Jorge Lendeborg Jr. as Arthur Wittle
- Ronny Chieng as Kendo
- Joshua Leonard as Cameron
- Steve Zissis as Bjorn
- Bill Nye as Chris
- Slavoj Žižek as Himself (cameo)

== Production ==
In June 2019, it was announced Owen Wilson and Salma Hayek had joined the cast of the film, with Mike Cahill directing from a screenplay he wrote and Amazon Studios distributing the film. Cahill managed to cast the two lead actors before they had seen the script, based on a twenty minute pitch.

Principal photography began in Los Angeles in June 2019. Filming also took place in Split and on the island of Lopud, Croatia. The tune 'You and I', which is part of the soundtrack, was performed by Morcheeba lead singer Skye Edwards.

== Release ==
The film was released on February 5, 2021 by Amazon Prime Video.

== Reception ==
Review aggregator Rotten Tomatoes gives the film a 27% approval rating, based on 105 reviews, with an average rating of 4.7/10. The website's critics consensus reads: "When it comes to building an entertaining sci-fi drama around some cool ideas, this Bliss is largely ignorant." Metacritic sampled 21 critics and calculated a weighted average score of 40 out of 100, indicating "mixed or average" reviews.

Nick Allen of RogerEbert.com gave the film 2 out of 4 stars, and called it "schmaltzy and pointlessly confusing." Frank Scheck of The Hollywood Reporter wrote: "As with both of his previous works, the filmmaker delivers an undeniably ambitious mind-bender that bites off more than it can narratively chew." Andrew Barker of Variety wrote: "Cahill gets so bogged down in hair-splitting rules and exposition that he loses track of the bigger themes."
