= Adam (2009 film) =

- Theatrical release poster
- Directed by: Max Mayer
- Written by: Max Mayer
- Produced by: Miranda de Pencier; Leslie Urdang; Dean Vanech
- Starring: Hugh Dancy; Rose Byrne; Frankie Faison; Mark Linn-Baker; Amy Irving; Peter Gallagher
- Cinematography: Seamus Tierney
- Edited by: Grant Myers
- Music by: Christopher Lennertz
- Production company: Olympus Pictures
- Distributed by: Fox Searchlight Pictures
- Release date: July 29, 2009
- Running time: 99 minutes
- Country: United States
- Language: English
- Budget: $3.2 million
- Box office: $2.6 million

Adam is a 2009 American romantic comedy drama film written and directed by Max Mayer and starring Hugh Dancy and Rose Byrne. The film follows the relationship between a young man named Adam (Dancy), who has Asperger syndrome, and Beth (Byrne). Mayer was inspired to write the film's script when he heard a radio interview with a man who had Asperger syndrome.

Filming took place in New York City in December 2005. The film premiered at the 2009 Sundance Film Festival, where it won the Alfred P. Sloan Prize, and was released in the United States on July 29, 2009. The release date in Canada and the UK was 7 August 2009 in Australia, and everywhere else after Labor Day.

== Plot ==
Adam Raki is a young man with Asperger syndrome living alone in Manhattan after his father's recent death. He has a friend, Harlan Keyes, an old army friend of his father's, who is always there for him. Because of his condition, Adam has difficulty communicating and likes to escape into his love of space exploration. His fixation on detail, repetitive behaviors, and mind-blindness cost him his job at a toy manufacturing company and nearly get him arrested after he is mistaken for a pedophile. He does not want to leave the apartment he and his father had been living in, but the loss of his job leaves him with an uncertain future, including the problem of continuing to pay the mortgage. Although he likes to stick to his routine and avoid socializing, Adam is lonely and wishes things could be different.

Beth Buchwald, a school teacher and aspiring children's book writer, moves into the apartment above his and they strike up an awkward friendship. One night, Beth is shocked to find him trying to clean her apartment windows suspended from the roof of the building in a space suit. She takes a liking to Adam despite his oddities. Adam hopes for a relationship with Beth. Although his first attempts are uneasy, he eventually breaks out of his beloved routines enough to be able to date Beth.

When Adam asks Beth if she was aroused as he was during an outing to Central Park, she is taken aback. Adam admits his Asperger's and explains his inability to interpret her emotions. Surprised by his innocence, the next day she asks a co-worker about Asperger's syndrome and is advised that Adam is not "dating material". Nonetheless, she is drawn to him, and his eccentricities make him more attractive to her. Adam's innocence, honesty and unique ways endear him to her and she falls in love.

Things begin to go downhill when Beth's father, Marty, gets into legal trouble. In a naive effort to make small talk, Adam asks Marty about the details of his alleged crimes, which does not go over well with Beth. After Adam discovers that Beth and her father engineered an "accidental" meeting (in an effort to protect Adam's feelings), Adam angrily accuses Beth of being a liar and she storms out.

Adam gets a call with a job offer in California working in satellite navigation. After Harlan counsels Adam that the world is full of liars and he simply needs to find the ones that are worthwhile for him, he goes to Beth, apologizes for his behavior, and asks her to go to California with him. Marty objects to this, and he and Beth argue. Beth asks Adam why he wants her to come with him. Not seeing the opportunity to express his feelings for Beth, Adam lists practical ways in which she helps him. Beth concludes that Adam is not in love with her, and she tells Adam she cannot go with him.

A year later, Adam is working at the observatory, where his keen interest in space telescopes and his eidetic memory have made him successful and fulfilled in his job. He has also seemingly learned to pick up on social cues and pushes himself to join social situations. He receives a package from Beth containing her first published children's book, inspired by Adam and Asperger's. He reads the first page in which Beth has anthropomorphized raccoons, used to represent Adam and his family. Adam looks deep in thought and, in a moment of realization, he understands why Beth wanted to anthropomorphize the raccoons. Even after a year apart, this moment of clarity seems to bring him closer to Beth and he smiles in happiness.

== Cast ==
- Hugh Dancy as Adam Raki
- Rose Byrne as Elizabeth (Beth) Buchwald
- Peter Gallagher as Marty Buchwald
- Amy Irving as Rebecca Buchwald
- Frankie Faison as Harlan Keyes
- Mark Linn-Baker as Sam Klieber
- Karina Arroyave as Anna Maria
- Maddie Corman as Robin
- Adam LeFevre as Wardlow
- Mark Margolis as Older Man
- Steffany Huckaby as Carol

== Production ==
Max Mayer formed the idea for Adam when he heard a man with Asperger syndrome being interviewed on National Public Radio about how he viewed the world. He was intrigued and, after doing further research on Asperger's, felt that the syndrome was a metaphor for "the tension between all of us human beings [... and] the desire to connect to one another". As he worked on the screenplay, Mayer drew the character of Adam from the man he had heard talking on the radio in addition to his research, while Beth's character was based on numerous people Mayer knew. Hugh Dancy and Mayer worked together for a month before filming began to develop Adam's character, and in preparation for his role, Dancy spoke with individuals affected by Asperger's about their feelings, sensory issues and interests.

Principal photography took place in New York City from November to December 2007. Specific filming locations included Greenwich Village and Central Park.

== Release ==
Adam had its world premiere at the 2009 Sundance Film Festival on January 20, 2009 where it won the Alfred P. Sloan Prize for "an outstanding feature film focusing on science or technology as a theme, or depicting a scientist, engineer or mathematician as a major character." Although producer Leslie Urdang was initially doubtful of the film's chances of finding a distributor at Sundance, Fox Searchlight Pictures bought the distribution rights. In March 2009, Adam was screened at the Method Fest Independent Film Festival, winning the Jury Award for Best Picture. It was shown at the Seattle International Film Festival, Edinburgh Film Festival, CineVegas Film Festival and San Francisco Jewish Film Festival before it had a U.S. theatrical release on July 29, 2009. It was released on DVD January 5, 2010.

== Reception ==
The review aggregator Rotten Tomatoes gives the film an approval rating of 64% based on 132 reviews, with an average rating of 5.99/10. The site's consensus reads, "Hugh Dancy's elegant performance as a man with Asperger's Syndrome elevates Adam, an offbeat but touching romantic comedy." On Metacritic, the film has a score of 56 out of 100 based on reviews from 27 critics, indicating "mixed or average" reviews.

Roger Ebert gave the film two and a half stars out of four, saying that the movie "wraps up their story in too tidy a package, insisting on finding the upbeat in the murky, and missing the chance to be more thoughtful about this challenging situation." Nina Caplan of Time Out London accused the film of dishonesty: "But it’s not clear why a pretty daddy’s girl would fall for a talkative and lonesome engineer with Asperger’s and a space fixation."

== Soundtrack ==
1. "A Friendly Face" – Flipper Dalton
2. "Gone Away" – Lucy Schwartz
3. "Someone Else's Life" – Joshua Radin
4. "Plastic Flowers" – The Hiders
5. "Into The Light" – The Alexandria Quartet
6. "Beautiful Day" – Miranda Lee Richards
7. "When You Find Me" – Joshua Radin feat. Maria Taylor
8. "Can't Go Back Now" – The Weepies
9. "Somebody Loved" – The Weepies
10. "Girl With the Light Brown Hair" – Charlotte Politte
11. "Jingle Bells"
12. "O Christmas Tree"

Awards
Preceded by Sleep Dealer	Alfred P. Sloan Prize Winner; 2009	Succeeded by Obselidia
