= Max Mayer (filmmaker) =

American filmmaker

- Education: New York University (MFA)
- Occupation: Film director

Max Mayer is an American filmmaker. He is one of the founding members of New York Stage and Film. Well known for directing TV shows including The West Wing and Alias, he wrote and directed the film Adam (2009), winner of the Alfred P. Sloan Prize.

== Filmography ==
- Me and Veronica (1993, producer)
- Better Living (1998)
- Adam (2009)
- As Cool as I Am (2013)
