= Son of Monarchs =

2020 drama film

- Poster
- Spanish: Hijo de Monarcas
- Directed by: Alexis Gambis
- Written by: Alexis Gambis
- Produced by: Abraham Dayan; Maria Altamirano
- Starring: Tenoch Huerta Mejía; Alexia Rasmussen; Lázaro Gabino Rodríguez; Noé Hernández; Paulina Gaitán; William Mapother
- Cinematography: Alejandro Mejía
- Edited by: Èlia Gasull Balada; Alexis Gambis
- Production companies: Imaginal Disc; Labocine
- Release date: November 1, 2020 (Morelia)
- Running time: 97 minutes
- Countries: United States; Mexico
- Languages: Spanish; English

Son of Monarchs (Spanish: Hijo de Monarcas) is a 2020 American-Mexican drama film directed and written by Alexis Gambis. The film stars Tenoch Huerta Mejía, Alexia Rasmussen, Lázaro Gabino Rodríguez, Noé Hernández, Paulina Gaitán and William Mapother.

The film had its world premiere at the 2020 Morelia International Film Festival, followed by a screening at the 2021 Sundance Film Festival on January 29, 2021.

== Plot ==
After the death of his grandmother, a Mexican biologist living in New York City returns to his hometown nestled in the majestic monarch butterfly forests of Michoacán after many years. The journey forces him to face the traumas of the past and reflect on his new hybrid identity, launching him into a personal and spiritual metamorphosis.

== Cast ==
The cast include:

- Tenoch Huerta Mejía as Mendel
- Alexia Rasmussen as Sarah
- Lázaro Gabino Rodríguez
- Noé Hernández as Simon
- Paulina Gaitán as Brisa
- William Mapother as Bob
- Electra Avellan as Lucía

== Release ==
The film had its premiere in the 2021 Sundance Film Festival on January 29, 2021 in the Next section, where it won the Alfred P. Sloan Prize. The film was picked up by WarnerMedia and was released in theaters and on HBO Max on October 15, 2021. Its commercial premiere is scheduled on May 25, 2023 in Mexican theaters.

== Reception ==
The review aggregator website Rotten Tomatoes surveyed 31 critics and, categorizing the reviews as positive or negative, assessed 18 as positive and 3 as negative for a 90% rating. Among the reviews, it determined an average rating of 7.1/10. The site's critical consensus reads, "Son of Monarchs requires patience, but viewers attuned to its ambitious wavelength will be rewarded with a film that gracefully combines science with social identity."
