= A Small Act =

- Directed by: Jennifer Arnold
- Produced by: Jennifer Arnold; Patti Lee; Jeffrey Soros
- Starring: Kimani, Caroline, Ruth, Karuru, Waceke
- Cinematography: Patti Lee
- Edited by: Carl Pfirman; Tyler Hubby
- Music by: Joel Goodman
- Production company: Mitahato Productions
- Distributed by: New Video Group
- Release date: January 2010 (Sundance)
- Running time: 88 minutes
- Country: United States
- Language: English

A Small Act is a documentary film produced by Harambee Media and HBO and directed by Jennifer Arnold. The documentary chronicles Chris Mburu's search for his benefactor, whose sponsorship allowed him to continue secondary school in Kenya. He would go on to earn degrees from the University of Nairobi and Harvard Law School, working as a United Nations Human Rights Commissioner.

== Synopsis ==
Chris Mburu is a United Nations human rights advocate. As a child in Kenya, he was a good student, but would not have been able to enter secondary school, as only Primary School is free of cost in Kenya. Due to his outstanding grades, Chris was selected for a direct scholarship, provided to him by a Swedish woman named Hilde Back, who had fled Nazi Germany because of her Jewish heritage.

In the present day, Mburu has decided to create a scholarship program of his own, and names it after his former benefactor, Hilde Back. In Kenya, three gifted students, Kimani, Ruth, and Caroline are vying for a scholarship that may be their only chance to continue school. Kimani, Ruth and Caroline take the Kenya Certificate of Primary Education Test, a nationwide standard that will determine their eligibility for Mburu's scholarship program. However, the violence and mayhem of the 2007–2008 Kenyan crisis may jeopardize the students' dreams.

Due to a lack of students meeting the predetermined threshold on the tests, Kimani is given a scholarship. Unfortunately, Ruth and Caroline do not receive scholarships, but it is revealed in the closing credits that they have been sponsored to continue schooling by the documentary film crew.

The film premiered at Sundance Film Festival and went on to win the Humanitas Prize for Documentary, a NAMIC Vision Award and was nominated for the Best Documentary Emmy Award.

The rippling effect theory has never been more easily proven than in this particular story. The "drop" in the "ocean" literally formed waves across the vast ocean. From Sweden to Kenya.

== Reception ==
Roger Ebert described the film as "heartwarming" in a 3.5/4 star review.
