= Jo Ann Beard =

American essayist (born 1955)

- Born: 1955 (age 70–71); Moline, Illinois, U.S.
- Education: University of Iowa
- Employer: Sarah Lawrence College
- Writing career
- Genre: Essay

Jo Ann Beard (born 1955) is an American essayist.

== Life ==
Beard was born in 1955 in Moline, Illinois. She graduated from the University of Iowa with a BFA degree in art, and from the Nonfiction Writing Program with an MFA in creative nonfiction. She teaches at Sarah Lawrence College.

Beard previously worked as a managing editor for a physics journal at the University of Iowa, and was a colleague of the victims of the University of Iowa shooting, which became a subject for her work.

Her writing has appeared in literary journals and magazines including The New Yorker, Tin House and O, The Oprah Magazine.

== Recognition ==
=== Awards ===
- 1997: Whiting Award
- 2005: Guggenheim Fellow

=== Honours ===
- 2024: Royal Society of Literature International Writer

== Works ==
=== Essays ===
- "The Fourth State of Matter", The New Yorker, June 24, 1996
- "Undertaker, Please Drive Slow", Tin House, Issue #12, Summer 2002
- "Maybe It Happened", O, The Oprah Magazine, August 2008
- "The Longest Night: Saying Goodbye to My Beloved Pet", O, The Oprah Magazine, June 2009

=== Books ===
- The Boys of My Youth. Little Brown & Co. 1999. ISBN 978-0-316-08525-0.
- In Zanesville. 2011.
- Festival Days. Little Brown & Co. 2021.
- Cheri. Serpent's Tail. 2023.

=== Anthology contributions ===
- Ian Frazier; Robert Atwan, eds. (1997). Best American Essays of 1997. Houghton Mifflin. ISBN 978-0-395-85694-9.
- David Foster Wallace; Robert Atwan, eds. (October 10, 2007). The Best American Essays 2007. Houghton Mifflin. ISBN 978-0-618-70927-4.
- Lex Williford; Michael Martone, eds. (2007). "The Fourth State of Matter". Touchstone anthology of contemporary creative nonfiction: work from 1970 to the present. Simon and Schuster. ISBN 978-1-4165-3174-6.
- Marybeth Bond; Pamela Michael, eds. (2004). "Out There". A Woman's Passion for Travel: True Stories of World Wanderlust. Travelers' Tales. ISBN 978-1-932361-14-8.
