= Dark Matter (film) =

- Theatrical release poster
- Directed by: Chen Shi-zheng
- Written by: Billy Shebar
- Produced by: Andrea Miller; Mary Salter; Janet Yang
- Starring: Liu Ye; Aidan Quinn; Meryl Streep
- Cinematography: Oliver Bokelberg
- Edited by: Michael Berenbaum; Pam Wise
- Music by: Van Dyke Parks
- Distributed by: First Independent Pictures
- Release dates: January 23, 2007 (Sundance); April 11, 2008 (United States)
- Running time: 90 minutes
- Country: United States
- Language: English
- Box office: $69,379

Dark Matter is a 2007 American drama film and the first feature film by opera director Chen Shi-zheng, starring Liu Ye, Aidan Quinn and Meryl Streep. Liu Ye plays a young scientist whose rising star must confront the dark forces of politics, ego, and cultural insensitivity. The film is loosely inspired by the true story of Gang Lu, a former graduate student who killed four faculty members and one student at the University of Iowa in 1991. However, the film’s story has substantial differences in plot and character motivation.

The film premiered at the 2007 Sundance Film Festival, where it won the Alfred P. Sloan Prize.

== Plot ==
Liu Xing is a humble but brilliant Chinese student who arrives at the fictional Hubble University and makes a bumpy transition into American life with the help of Joanna Silver. Silver is a wealthy university patron who has a fascination with Chinese culture and takes a liking to Liu Xing. Xing joins a select cosmology group under the direction of his hero, the famous cosmologist Professor Jacob Reiser. The group is working to create a model of the origins of the universe, based on Reiser's theory. Xing's enormous talent leads him quickly to become Reiser's protégé, and it seems that only hard work stands between him and a bright future in science.

Xing is obsessed with the study of dark matter, an unseen substance that he believes shapes the universe, and a theory that conflicts with the Reiser model. Xing makes scientific breakthroughs of his own which improve the Reiser model. Without Professor Reiser's approval, Liu Xing proposes to research dark matter for his doctoral dissertation. Reiser explains to Xing that this type of research is too complicated and suggests that he should pick a simpler dissertation topic.

Refusing to work with Xing, Reiser finds a new protégé in Feng Gang, another Chinese student who was Xing's rival in undergraduate school in Beijing. Professor Reiser approves of Feng's dissertation proposal as it sticks to the Reiser model. Feng's English skills are far superior to his fellow Chinese students', and he refuses to speak in Mandarin with them. Feng changes his name to Laurence so that Americans would be more comfortable pronouncing his name.

Without the permission of Professor Reiser, Xing publishes an article in an astronomy journal. Reiser is enraged by this and refuses to accept Xing's doctoral dissertation.

At a graduation party for the Chinese students it is announced that Laurence Feng has won the university's Gell-Mann honorary doctorate prize for that year. Joanna Silver urges Professor Reiser to do something to help Liu Xing. Reiser informs her that he has written a "very fine" recommendation for him. Professor Reiser also attempts to belittle Xing by telling Silver that Xing is not a "team player."

Xing does not graduate and finds his dream of winning the Nobel Prize shattered. He goes on to sell beauty products to try to make money. His roommate offers to find him a job in China, but Xing refuses to leave. A few months pass and Xing mails all of his money (a check for ten thousand dollars) to his parents in China.

One day, Xing returns to campus. He heads into an auditorium where Laurence Feng is giving a presentation to the cosmology department. Unable to cope with his emotions, Xing pulls a revolver out of his coat and begins firing, shooting Laurence and Reiser before making his way to Reiser's office and shooting himself in the head.

== Cast ==
- Liu Ye as Liu Xing (simplified Chinese: 刘兴; traditional Chinese: 劉興; pinyin: Liú Xīng)
- Aidan Quinn as Jacob Reiser
- Meryl Streep as Joanna Silver
- Lloyd Suh as Laurence Feng (冯刚; 馮剛; Féng Gāng)
- Peng Chi as Mama
- Blair Brown as Hildy
- Boris McGiver as Reverend Hollings
- Bill Irwin as Hal Silver
- Hui Zhang as Monkey King
- Taylor Schilling as Jackie
- Joe Grifasi as Professor Colby
- Rob Campbell as Gary Small
- Jodi Russell as Claire Reiser
- Qian Yi as Cindy Feng

== Release ==
This film's general U.S. release date, originally set for April 2007, was pushed back over a year because its plot line of an East Asian student involved in a mass shooting on a U.S. college campus too closely resembled the Virginia Tech shooting. It was finally given a limited theatrical release in the US market on April 11, 2008.

== Response ==
=== Box office ===
Dark Matter grossed $30,591 in the United States and Canada and $38,788 in other territories, for a worldwide total of $69,379.

=== Critical reception ===
On review aggregator Rotten Tomatoes, the film holds an approval rating of 40% based on 40 reviews, with an average rating of 4.99/10. The site's critical consensus reads: "The creaky plotting, inscrutable characters, and unconvincing ending make it difficult for audiences to connect with Dark Matter". On Metacritic, the film has a weighted average score of 49 out of 100, based on 16 critics, indicating "mixed or average" reviews.

Awards
Preceded by The House of Sand	Alfred P. Sloan Prize Winner; 2007	Succeeded by Sleep Dealer
