= Alfred P. Sloan Prize =

Film award

The Alfred P. Sloan Prize is an award given each year, starting in 2003, to a film at the Sundance Film Festival. It is one of the Alfred P. Sloan Science in Film Awards.

== Criteria ==
The prize is given to an outstanding feature film that focuses on science or technology as a theme, or depicts a scientist, engineer, or mathematician as a major character. The jury is composed of established film and science professionals.

Each winner is presented with a cash award provided by the Alfred P. Sloan Foundation. As of January 2024, the award is $25,000.

== Winners ==
Year	Film	Director	Writer(s)
2003	Dopamine	Mark Decena	Mark Decena & Timothy Breitbach
2004	Primer	Shane Carruth	Shane Carruth
2005	Grizzly Man	Werner Herzog	Werner Herzog
2006	The House of Sand	Andrucha Waddington	Elena Soarez
2007	Dark Matter	Chen Shi-zheng	Billy Shebar
2008	Sleep Dealer	Alex Rivera	Alex Rivera & David Riker
2009	Adam	Max Mayer	Max Mayer
2010	Obselidia	Diane Bell	Diane Bell
2011	Another Earth	Mike Cahill	Mike Cahill & Brit Marling
2012	Robot & Frank	Jake Schreier	Christopher Ford
2012	Valley of Saints	Musa Syeed	Musa Syeed
2013	Computer Chess	Andrew Bujalski	Andrew Bujalski
2014	I Origins	Mike Cahill	Mike Cahill
2015	The Stanford Prison Experiment	Kyle Patrick Alvarez	Tim Talbott
2016	Embrace of the Serpent	Ciro Guerra	Ciro Guerra & Jacques Toulemonde
2017	Marjorie Prime	Michael Almereyda	Michael Almereyda & Jordan Harrison
2018	Searching	Aneesh Chaganty	Aneesh Chaganty & Sev Ohanian
2019	The Boy Who Harnessed the Wind	Chiwetel Ejiofor	Chiwetel Ejiofor
2020	Tesla	Michael Almereyda	Michael Almereyda
2021	Son of Monarchs	Alexis Gambis	Alexis Gambis
2022	After Yang	Kogonada	Kogonada
2023	The Pod Generation	Sophie Barthes	Sophie Barthes
2024	Love Me	Zucheros	Zucheros
2025	Sally	Cristina Constantini	Cristina Constantini & Tom Maroney
2026	In the Blink of an Eye	Andrew Stanton	Colby Day

== YouTube award ==
In 2024, the Foundation partnered with Independent Media Initiative (IMI) and created the annual Sloan Science Prizes for YouTube; two prizes are awarded, for documentary and narrative fiction.

== See also ==
- Alfred P. Sloan
- Sloan Science & Film for all award winners
- List of Sundance Film Festival award winners
