= Alexis Gambis =

French Venezuelan film director

- Occupations: Director, Writer, Producer and Biologist
- Years active: 2010–present

Alexis Gambis is a French Venezuelan film director, writer, producer and biologist. He is best known for his work on the films The Fly Room and Son of Monarchs. He is a 2019 TED Fellow.

== Life and career ==
Alexis holds a Masters of Fine Arts from NYU Tisch School of the Arts. While there, he collaborated with James Franco and eleven other student filmmakers to co-direct The Color of Time (Tar). He also holds a Ph.D in molecular biology from the Rockefeller University. He is an Assistant Professor of Biology, Film & New Media at NYU Abu Dhabi.

Alexis's debut feature film The Fly Room premiered at the 15th Annual Woodstock Film Festival. In 2018, his short film, The Monarch Mimes (Los Mimos Monarcas), was showcased at the Morelia International Film Festival. His second feature film, Son of Monarchs, starring Tenoch Huerta, William Mapother, Paulina Gaitán and Angélica Aragón, premiered at the Sundance Film Festival in 2021. The film also won Alfred P. Sloan Prize at the 2021 Sundance Film Festival. He is the founder of both the annual Imagine Science Film Festival and science film streaming platform Labocine.

== Filmography ==
Year	Title	Writer	Director	Producer	Note
2010	Disposable	✓	✓		Short Film
2010	Courtship	✓	✓	✓	Short Film
2012	Déja vu	✓	✓		Short Film
2012	The Color of Time	✓	✓		Feature Film, co-director
2014	The Fly Room	✓	✓		Feature Film
2014	Campo Experimental	✓	✓	✓	Feature Film
2017	Mosaic	✓	✓	✓	Feature Film
2018	Insan	✓	✓		Short Film
2018	She Who Dreams (La Que Sueña)	✓	✓		Short Film
2018	The Monarch Mimes (Los Mimos Monarcas)	✓	✓		Short Film
2018	My Brother (Mi Hermano)	✓	✓		Short Film
2020	Son of Monarchs	✓	✓		Feature Film
