= Better Living =

- Directed by: Max Mayer
- Written by: Max Mayer; George F. Walker (play)
- Produced by: Melissa Marr; Lemore Syvan
- Starring: Olympia Dukakis; Roy Scheider; Edward Herrmann; Deborah Hedwall; Catherine Corpeny; Wendy Hoopes; James Villemaire
- Cinematography: Kurt Lenning
- Edited by: Steve Silkensen
- Music by: John M. Davis
- Distributed by: Goldheart Pictures
- Release date: November 2, 1998 (Hamptons International Film Festival)
- Running time: 95 minutes
- Country: United States
- Language: English

Better Living is a 1998 American film featured in the Hamptons International Film Festival. It stars Roy Scheider and Olympia Dukakis, and includes Edward Herrmann.

== Cast ==
- Olympia Dukakis as Nora
- Roy Scheider as Tom
- Edward Herrmann as Jack
- Deborah Hedwall as Elizabeth
- Catherine Corpeny as MaryAnn
- Wendy Hoopes as Gail
- James Villemaire as Junior
- Scott Cohen as Larry
- Brian Tarantina as Danny
- Jessy Terrero as Biker #1
- Phyllis Somerville as Nellie
- Bill J. Vlasnic Police Officer
