= Mike Cahill (filmmaker) =

American filmmaker (born 1979)

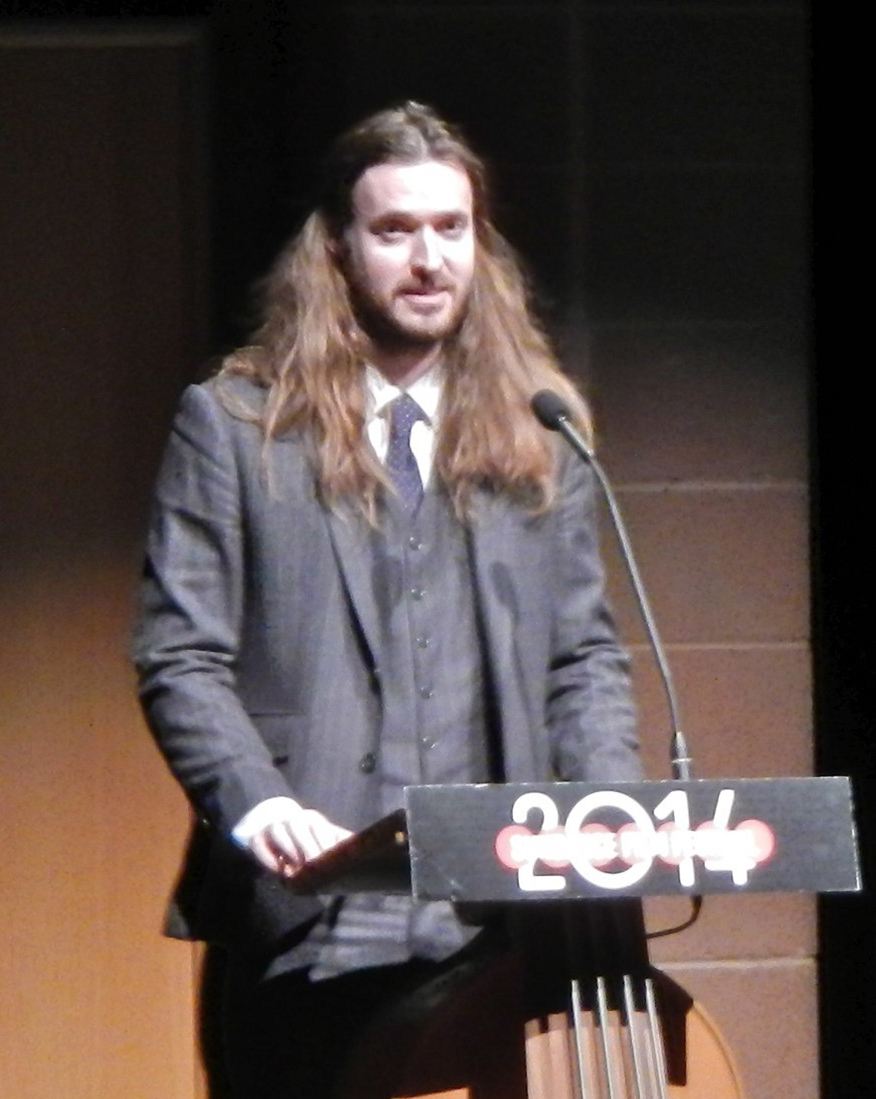
- Mike Cahill, 2014
- Born: July 5, 1979 (age 46); New Haven, Connecticut, U.S.
- Occupations: Film director; screenwriter; film editor; film producer; cinematographer
- Notable work: Another Earth (2011)

Mike Cahill (born July 5, 1979) is an American filmmaker.

== Early life and education ==
External image
- Mike Cahill, at the Crosby Street Hotel in Manhattan.—indieWire

Mike Cahill was born in New Haven, Connecticut, on July 5, 1979. His first forays into filmmaking were with Fisher-Price and VHS camcorders when he was young. He gained his first credit as a documentarian at the age of 17, when he and a friend directed a film titled The Pocket, about D.C go-go music.

After high school, Cahill studied economics at Georgetown University, graduating in 2001. While a student there he formed a close relationship with professional colleague and friend Brit Marling, whom he met at a Georgetown film festival, and the two began working on short films together where Marling would act and Cahill would direct.

== Career ==
While still in his senior year at Georgetown, Cahill began interning with National Geographic Television and Film, soon becoming their youngest field producer, editor and cinematographer. He and Marling collaborated on Boxers and Ballerinas (2004), an exploration of the U.S.–Cuba conflict through the lives of four characters, while living in Cuba. Cahill next moved to Los Angeles. There he was taken on as editor for two Sundance features, Leonard Cohen: I'm Your Man and Everyone Stares: The Police Inside Out.

Cahill's first feature film as director, co-written with Marling, Another Earth, about a parallel planet Earth, won the Alfred P. Sloan Prize at the 2011 Sundance Film Festival and was picked up for distribution by Fox Searchlight Pictures. Variety reported: "[It] has been deemed one of the more highly praised pics of the fest as it received a standing ovation after the screening and strong word of mouth from buyers and festgoers." The distributor Fox Searchlight Pictures won distribution rights to the film in a deal worth $1.5 million to $2 million, beating out other distributors including Focus Features and the Weinstein Company.

Cahill's second feature film I Origins again won the Alfred P. Sloan Prize, this time at the 2014 Sundance Film Festival, making Cahill the only person to have received the award twice. The film was picked up for distribution by Fox Searchlight.

In 2011, before the release of I Origins, a press release by Fox Searchlight stated that Cahill was working on a film about reincarnation and another about "a fashion designer who lives at the bottom of the sea." As of 2015 he is also working on a sequel of I Origins. "There's a sequel in the works. It's not scripted. We're not in production yet, but we set up at Fox Searchlight".

Starting in 2015, Cahill is an executive producer of the Syfy TV show The Magicians, and directed the pilot episode. He is also an executive producer on The Path, and directed the first two episodes.

== Influences ==
Cahill has cited Julian Schnabel as a significant influence on his work. He considers Krzysztof Kieslowski one of his favorite filmmakers, specifically citing The Double Life of Véronique as having a profound impact on him. Cahill, who has a casual interest in astronomy, was also influenced by the work of astronomer Richard Berendzen, in particular, Berendzen's audiobook Pulp Physics. He is also an admirer of Carl Sagan and Isaac Asimov.

He has always admired science.

His favorite movie of all time is 2001: A Space Odyssey. "Because that movie, what it presents to you, can’t be articulated in any other form than as a movie," he said.

== Filmography ==
| Year | Film | Director | Writer | Producer | Editor | DP |
|---|---|---|---|---|---|---|
| 2004 | Boxers and Ballerinas | Yes | Yes | No | No | No |
| 2005 | Leonard Cohen: I'm Your Man | No | No | No | Yes | No |
| 2006 | Everyone Stares: The Police Inside Out | No | No | No | Yes | No |
| 2011 | Another Earth | Yes | Yes | Yes | Yes | Yes |
| 2014 | I Origins | Yes | Yes | Yes | Yes | No |
| 2021 | Bliss | Yes | Yes | No | No | No |

== Awards and nominations ==
| Year | Award | Category | Film | Result |
|---|---|---|---|---|
| 2005 | Breckenridge Festival of Film | Best of the Fest (shared with Brit Marling) | Boxers and Ballerinas | Won |
| 2005 | Cinequest San Jose Film Festival | Director's Award (shared with Brit Marling) | Boxers and Ballerinas | Won |
| 2011 | Sundance Film Festival | Alfred P. Sloan Prize | Another Earth | Won |
| 2011 | Sundance Film Festival | Special Jury Prize | Another Earth | Won |
| 2011 | Sundance Film Festival | Grand Jury Prize | Another Earth | Nominated |
| 2011 | Scream Awards | Best Independent Movie | Another Earth | Nominated |
| 2011 | National Board of Review | Top Ten Independent Films | Another Earth | Won |
| 2011 | Locarno International Film Festival | Junior Jury Award - Special Mention | Another Earth | Won |
| 2011 | Locarno International Film Festival | Golden Leopard | Another Earth | Nominated |
| 2011 | Gotham Awards | Breakthrough Director Award | Another Earth | Nominated |
| 2011 | Deauville Film Festival | Grand Special Prize | Another Earth | Nominated |
| 2012 | Georgia Film Critics Association | Best Picture | Another Earth | Won |
| 2012 | Independent Spirit Awards | Best First Feature (shared with Hunter Gray, Brit Marling and Nick Shumaker) | Another Earth | Nominated |
| 2012 | Independent Spirit Awards | Best First Screenplay (shared with Brit Marling) | Another Earth | Nominated |
| 2012 | Golden Trailer Awards | Best Music | Another Earth | Won |
| 2012 | Golden Trailer Awards | Best Independent Poster | Another Earth | Nominated |
| 2012 | Academy of Science Fiction, Fantasy & Horror Films | Best Writing (shared with Brit Marling) | Another Earth | Nominated |
| 2012 | Prism Awards | Feature Film - Mental Health | Another Earth | Nominated |
| 2014 | Sundance Film Festival | Alfred P. Sloan Prize | I Origins | Won |
| 2014 | Tallinn Black Nights Film Festival | Best North American Independent Film | I Origins | Nominated |
| 2014 | Sitges Film Festival | Best Film | I Origins | Won |
