= Summer Pasture =

- Film poster
- Directed by: Lynn True; Nelson Walker III
- Produced by: Lynn True; Nelson Walker III
- Cinematography: Nelson Walker III
- Edited by: Lynn True
- Release date: April 10, 2010 (Full Frame)
- Running time: 85 minutes
- Countries: China; United States
- Language: Tibetan

Summer Pasture is a 2010 documentary film by Lynn True, Nelson Walker and Tsering Perlo. The film follows a nomadic family living in Kham.

The film premiered at the 2010 Full Frame Documentary Film Festival, and had a theatrical premiere in Manhattan on August 15, 2011.
