= A Film Unfinished =

2010 Israeli and German film

- שתיקת הארכיון
- Directed by: Yael Hersonski
- Written by: Yael Hersonski
- Produced by: Itai Ken-Tor; Philippa Kowarsky; Noemi Schory
- Narrated by: Rona Kenan
- Cinematography: Itai Ne'eman
- Edited by: Joel Alexis
- Music by: Yishai Adar
- Production company: Oscilloscope Pictures
- Release date: 24 July 2010 (MIFF)
- Running time: 89 minutes
- Countries: Germany; Israel
- Languages: English with subtitles for Hebrew, German and Polish
- Box office: $311,542(USA)

A Film Unfinished (Hebrew title: שתיקת הארכיון Shtikat haArkhion, German title: Geheimsache Ghettofilm) is a 2010 documentary film by Yael Hersonski.

== Summary ==
The film re-examines the making of an unfinished 1942 German propaganda film (titled Das Ghetto, "The Ghetto") depicting the Warsaw Ghetto two months before the mass extermination of its inhabitants in the German operation known as the Grossaktion Warsaw. The documentary features interviews with surviving ghetto residents and a re-enactment of testimony from Willy Wist, one of the camera operators who filmed scenes for Das Ghetto.

== Release ==
It premiered at the 2010 Sundance Film Festival, where it won the "World Cinema Documentary Editing Award". At the Hot Docs festival in Toronto, the film won the Best International Feature Documentary award. The film was released theatrically in the US on 18 August 2010.

The film's distributor, Oscilloscope, appealed to the MPAA over the film's R rating but was unsuccessful in reclassifying the film. Oscilloscope says that the R rating is inconsistent with cultural norms because the U.S. Holocaust Memorial Museum, which is visited by school children, has more graphic footage.

== Reception ==
On Rotten Tomatoes the documentary has an approval rating of 97% based on reviews from 65 critics. The site's consensus states "A heartbreaking, haunting historical document, A Film Unfinished excavates a particularly horrible chapter of Holocaust history, and in doing so, the film provides a glimpse into the Nazi propaganda machine." On Metacritic it has a score of 88% based on reviews from 19 critics, indicating "universal acclaim".
