= Kick in Iran =

Kick in Iran is a feature documentary by Fatima Geza Abdollahyan. It portrays Taekwondo fighter Sara Khoshjamal-Fekri on her way to the Olympic Games 2008, in Beijing. Sara Khoshjamal Fekri is the first female athlete from Iran to ever qualify directly for the Olympic Games.

== Synopsis ==
The movie follows Sara Khoshjamal-Fekri and her coach Maryam Azarmehr during a nine-month period, beginning with qualification and including participation in the Olympic Games 2008. Because they live in a Muslim country, the two athletes have to face a lot of challenges. They work hard as they prepare to represent the Islamic Republic of Iran as female Taekwondo-fighters.

Kick in Iran portrays day-to-day life in the Iran for two women while wearing both the hijab and the dobok.

== Festivals ==
- Sundance Film Festival 2010 (world premiere), USA
- True/False Film Festival, USA
- Dallas International Filmfestival, USA
- Visions du Reel, Switzerland
- International Aljazeera Dokumentary Film Festival, Qatar
- Filmfest Munich, Germany
- Warsaw Film Festival, Poland
- Mumbai Film Festival, India
- Cine//B Film Festival, Chile
- Corona Cork Filmfest, Ireland
- International Images Film Festival for Women, Zimbabwe
- Belgrade Documentary and Short Film Festival, Serbia
- BAFICI, Argentina
- Chennai International Film Festival, India
- Noor Iranian Film Festival, USA
- Film Festival for Women’s Rights, FIWOM, South Korea

== Awards ==
- Gerd Ruge Award, Germany
- Special mentions, 13th BAFICI, UNICEF AWARD
- Special mentions, 26th Warsaw Filmfestival
- Nominated for the Grand Jury Award of the Sundance Filmfestival 2010
