= 2011 Sundance Film Festival =

Film festival in Park City, Utah

- Festival poster
- Opening film: Sing Your Song, Pariah, The Guard, Project Nim
- Closing film: The Son of No One
- Location: Park City, Salt Lake City, Ogden, and Sundance, Utah
- Hosted by: Sundance Institute
- Festival date: January 20–30, 2011
- Language: English
- Website: sundance.org/festival
- 2012 Sundance Film Festival 2010 Sundance Film Festival

The 27th annual Sundance Film Festival took place from January 20, 2011 until January 30, 2011 in Park City, Utah, with screenings in Salt Lake City, Utah, Ogden, Utah, and Sundance, Utah.

The festival opened with five screenings, one from each category in competition: Sing Your Song, Pariah, The Guard, Project Nim, and Shorts Program I. The New Frontier category opened with All That Is Solid Melts into Air. The closing night film was The Son of No One.

There were 750 sponsors of the festival and 1,670 volunteers. Attendance was initially estimated at 60,000 people.

== Films ==
10,279 films were submitted. 3,812 feature films were submitted, including 1,943 from the US and 1,869 internationally. From these, 118 feature films were selected and include 95 world premieres. 6,467 short films were submitted, 81 short films were selected to be screened and 12 shorts are viewable on YouTube. The festival had films from 40 first-time filmmakers (25 in competition), representing 29 countries.

Keri Putnam, Executive Director of the Sundance Institute said, "For an artist to make it to the Festival among 10,000 submissions is an incredible achievement in his or her own right."

For the second year in a row, Sundance Selects selected five films to make available nationwide through video on demand: Kaboom, Mad Bastards, Septien, These Amazing Shadows, and Uncle Kent.

For a full list of films appearing at the festival, see List of films at the 2011 Sundance Film Festival.

=== YouTube Screening Room ===
12 short films from the 2011 Sundance Film Festival and 8 "classic" shorts were available to watch online at the YouTube Screening Room. Each series is scheduled to run for 6 weeks, beginning January 6, 2011, through February 3, 2011.

Launched on January 6, 2011 were shorts from past years by filmmakers with feature films at this year's festival. The short films, directors, and current films include:

- By Modern Measure by Matthew Lessner, The Woods
- Little Farm by Calvin Reeder, The Oregonian
- Countertransference by Madeleine Olnek, Codependent Lesbian Space Alien Seeks Same
- Choices by Rashaad Ernesto Green, Gun Hill Road

The January 13, 2011 launch included shorts developed at the Sundance Institute Feature Film Labs:

- Conversion by Nanobah Becker
- Pandemic 41.410806, -75.654259 by Lance Weiler
- Pop Foul by Moon Molson, Crazy Beats Strong Every Time
- Sikumi by Andrew Okpeaha MacLean, On the Ice

Scheduled to launch in 3 parts on January 20, January 27, and February 3 are short films from this year's festival:

- 8 Bits by Valere Amirault, Sarah Laufer, Jean Delaunay, and Benjamin Mattern
- Andy and Zach by Nick Paley
- Close. by Tahir Jetter
- Excuse Me by Duncan Birmingham
- Jupiter Elicius by Kelly Sears
- oops by Chris Beckman
- Sasquatch Birth Journal 2 by David & Nathan Zellner
- Skateistan: To Live and Skate Kabul by Orlando von Einsiedel
- The High Level Bridge by Trevor Anderson
- The Hunter and The Swan by Emily Carmichael
- Xemoland by Daniel Cardenas
- Yelp (With Apologies to Allen Ginsberg's "Howl" by Tiffany Shlain)

== Awards ==
- Grand Jury Prize: Documentary - How to Die in Oregon
- Grand Jury Prize: Dramatic - Like Crazy
- World Cinema Grand Jury Prize: Documentary - Hell and Back Again
- World Cinema Grand Jury Prize: Dramatic - Happy, Happy
- Audience Award: U.S. Documentary - Buck
- Audience Award: U.S. Dramatic - Circumstance
- World Cinema Audience Award: Documentary - Senna
- World Cinema Audience Award: Dramatic - Kinyarwanda
- Best of NEXT Audience Award - to.get.her
- U.S. Directing Award: Documentary - Jon Foy for Resurrect Dead: The Mystery of the Toynbee Tiles
- U.S. Directing Award: Dramatic - Sean Durkin for Martha Marcy May Marlene
- World Cinema Directing Award: Documentary - James Marsh for Project Nim
- World Cinema Directing Award: Dramatic - Paddy Considine for Tyrannosaur
- Waldo Salt Screenwriting Award - Sam Levinson for Another Happy Day
- World Cinema Dramatic Screenwriting Award - Erez Kav-El for Restoration
- U.S. Documentary Editing Award - Matthew Hamachek and Marshall Curry for If a Tree Falls: A Story of the Earth Liberation Front
- World Cinema Documentary Editing Award - Goran Hugo Olsson and Hanna Lejonqvist for The Black Power Mixtape 1967-1975
- Excellence in Cinematography Award: U.S. Documentary - Eric Strauss, Ryan Hill and Peter Hutchens for The Redemption of General Butt Naked
- Excellence in Cinematography Award: U.S. Dramatic - Bradford Young for Pariah
- World Cinema Cinematography Award: Documentary - Danfung Dennis for Hell and Back Again
- World Cinema Cinematography Award: Dramatic - Diego F. Jimenez for All Your Dead Ones
- U.S. Documentary Special Jury Prize - Being Elmo: A Puppeteer's Journey
- U.S. Dramatic Special Jury Prize - Another Earth
- World Cinema Documentary Special Jury Prize - Position Among the Stars
- U.S. Dramatic Special Jury Prize for Breakout Performance - Felicity Jones for Like Crazy
- World Dramatic Special Jury Prizes for Breakout Performances - Peter Mullan and Olivia Colman for Tyrannosaur
- Jury Prize in U.S. Short Filmmaking - Brick Novax Pt 1 and 2
- International Jury Prize in Short Filmmaking - Deeper Than Yesterday
- Honorable Mention in Short Filmmaking - Choke, Diarchy, The External World, The Legend of Beaver Dam, Out of Reach, and Protoparticles
- Alfred P. Sloan Feature Film Prize - Another Earth
- Sundance Institute/Mahindra Global Filmmaking Awards - Bogdan Mustata of Romania for Wolf, Ernesto Contrera of Mexico for I Dream In Another Language, Seng Tat Liew of Malaysia for In What City Does It Live?, and Talya Lavie of Israel for Zero Motivation
- Sundance Institute/NHK Award - Cherien Dabis, director of May in the Summer

The awards for short films were announced January 25. On January 28, 2011 the Alfred P. Sloan Prize was awarded to the film Another Earth. All of the awards were announced January 29 at the 2011 Sundance Film Festival Awards Ceremony, which was hosted by Tim Blake Nelson near Park City.

== Juries ==
The 23 jury members, which award prizes to films, were announced on January 17, 2011. Presenters are followed by asterisks.

U.S. Documentary Jury

- Jeffrey Blitz
- Matt Groening (*)
- Laura Poitras
- Jess Search (*)
- Sloane Klevin

U.S. Dramatic Jury

- America Ferrera (*)
- Todd McCarthy (*)
- Tim Orr (*)
- Kimberly Peirce (*)
- Jason Reitman (*)

World Documentary Jury

- José Padilha
- Mette Hoffmann Meyer
- Lucy Walker

World Dramatic Jury

- Susanne Bier
- Bong Joon-ho
- Rajendra Roy

Alfred P. Sloan Jury

- Jon Amiel
- Paula Apsel
- Sean M. Carroll
- Clark Gregg (*)

Short Film Jury

- Barry Jenkins
- Kim Morgan
- Sara Bernstein

Helen Fisher was initially announced as a member of the Alfred P. Sloan Prize Jury, but was not included in the final list of jurors.

Additional award presenters included Ray Liotta, Joshua Leonard, and Vera Farmiga.

== Festival theaters ==
- Park City
  - Eccles Theatre - 1,270 seats
  - Egyptian Theatre - 290 seats
  - Holiday Village Cinema I - 164 seats
  - Holiday Village Cinema II - 156 seats
  - Holiday Village Cinema III - 156 seats
  - Holiday Village Cinema IV - 164 seats
  - Library Center Theatre - 478 seats
  - Prospector Square Theatre - 336 seats
  - Redstone Cinema 7 - 175 seats
  - Redstone Cinema 8 - 193 seats
  - Temple Theatre - 314 seats
  - Yarrow Hotel Theatre - 295 seats
- Salt Lake City
  - Broadway Centre Cinemas IV - 211 seats
  - Broadway Centre Cinemas V - 242 seats
  - Broadway Centre Cinemas VI - 274 seats
  - Rose Wagner Performing Arts Center - 495 seats
  - Tower Theatre - 349 seats
- Sundance Resort
  - Sundance Resort Screening Room - 164 seats
- Ogden
  - Peery's Egyptian Theatre - 840 seats

=== Sundance Film Festival U.S.A. ===
On January 27, 2011 the festival sent 9 filmmakers to 9 cities across the US to screen and discuss their films. The cities and films included:

- Ann Arbor, Michigan at Michigan Theater - Win Win, and post-festival: Cedar Rapids
- Brookline, Massachusetts at Coolidge Corner Theatre - My Idiot Brother
- Brooklyn, New York at BAM - Kaboom
- Chicago, Illinois at Music Box Theatre - The Music Never Stopped
- Los Angeles, California at Vintage Cinemas Vista Theatre - The Details
- Madison, Wisconsin at Sundance Cinemas Wisconsin - Like Crazy
- Nashville, Tennessee at The Belcourt Theatre - Letters from the Big Man
- San Francisco, California at Sundance Kabuki Cinemas - Connected: An Autoblogography about Love, Death and Technology
- Seattle, Washington at The Egyptian Theatre - Cedar Rapids

== Reception ==
Bob Tourtellotte of Reuters wrote "Sundance 2011 has proven to be exceptionally strong, audiences and filmmakers seem to agree." Tourtellotte reported that Robert Redford said that three years ago the Sundance Institute "set out to get back to its roots of supporting alternative voices in cinema and he felt like this year that strategy paid off." Redford said "This year, what has excited me, is I think the quality is increasing in diversity and is increasing in depth."

The AP reported that Redford said it's "always a relief" when the festival ends because "it's really exhausting."

Kenneth Turan, film critic for the Los Angeles Times, wrote "though the festival has gotten ever bigger — and (thankfully) more efficient in moving its close to 50,000 attendees in and out of its far-flung theaters — it still retains the scrappy, antic spirit that has animated it from the start." Turan wrote "One of the paradoxes of Sundance is that the quirkiness and charm around the edges of the festival are not always fully appreciated because so much of the media focus is on the premieres section and the U.S. dramatic competition" which he said "are, frankly, often the weakest parts of the festival."

Turan said "Sundance's insistence on giving equal weight to documentaries and dramas has made it into as important a nonfiction showcase as any festival in the world; witness the fact that four out of the five Oscar-nominated docs this year debuted at Sundance last January." He also wrote that the foreign language film competition "is a strength at Sundance, and yet that field is given even less popular attention than the documentaries."

Peter Knegt wrote that this year's festival "probably won't replicate last year's Oscar record." He said "Despite a huge surge in sales, this year's Sundance slate looks like it might be the least Oscar-friendly in some time." He noted that the U.S. Dramatic Grand Jury Prize winners have been nominated for Best Picture for two years (referring to Precious and Winter's Bone). Knegt speculated on films that might be nominated for the Oscars. Films he deemed "most likely to succeed" at being nominated included: Like Crazy for Best Picture, Michael Shannon of Take Shelter for Best Actor, Elizabeth Olsen of Martha Marcy May Marlene for Best Actress, Felicity Jones of Like Crazy for Best Actress, Jessica Chastain of Take Shelter for Best Supporting Actress, Project Nim for Best Documentary Feature, Page One for Best Documentary Feature, and The Interrupters for Best Documentary Feature. He wrote "It's reasonable to feel assured that at least one of Sundance's docs will end up an Oscar nominee, if not two, three or four."

Jada Yuan of New York magazine wrote "perhaps the biggest highlight of the festival is just how ripe it's been for acquisitions, with nearly 30 films getting picked up, the most at any Sundance ever."

On "why everyone is suddenly so bullish on independent film", Owen Gleiberman wrote that the "energy and optimism at Sundance this year wasn't just hype." He said the factors he thought were driving a new evolving vision of the indie film world included: "The deals haven’t gotten cheaper — they've gotten smarter", a belief that last year's new festival director John Cooper and director of programming Trevor Groth "have re-energized the festival, heightening its quality and organizing the movies with a tempting new shape and vision", video on demand gives distributors a safety net and more confidence, and the audiences for Sundance movies are not going away, saying "The Oscars...have become a testament to the central place that Sundance movies now occupy."

== Acquisitions ==
Redford was happy about the success of the festival, with about 45 films being sold vs 14 in 2010, an increase of about 220%. Redford said studios are realizing "there are audiences" for indie films.

Regarding the number of dramas acquired by distributors, Kenneth Turan said "That number seems way out of proportion to the quality of the films, or to how well they will likely do in the marketplace." Turan wrote "In documentaries, the situation was reversed: The quality was sky high, but hardly any were acquired for theatrical release" because audiences are "reluctant to embrace the genre."

At the 2010 Sundance Film Festival, 9 films went on to garner 15 Oscar nominations. Tom Hall of indieWire wrote "Following one of the most critically successful years in the festival's history, a year that saw Blue Valentine, Winter’s Bone, The Kids Are Alright, I Am Love, Animal Kingdom, Enter The Void, Please Give, A Film Unfinished, Gasland, Restrepo, Exit Through The Gift Shop, Waste Land, Last Train Home, The Oath, The Tillman Story and many others find tremendous acclaim, 2011 always had its work cut out for it", saying "after looking at a strong year at the indie box office for last year's films, reasonable, level-headed deals were popping up all over Sundance.". But Hall wrote that this year he felt that "the recession came home to roost." He said "If 2011 marks the line in the sand for independent film financing in a recession driven investment climate, it also marked the complete opposite in the distribution world; a return to the glory days of pure, unadulterated content speculation." Hall wondered about the pressure on this year's acquired films to "perform across multiple platforms" in the next year. He wrote "if this year’s buying spree proves anything, it at once cements the dominance of the Sundance Film Festival as the premiere market festival in the US and, given many of the films that sold, raises my eyebrows."

Acquisitions at the festival included:

- Anchor Bay Entertainment
  - The Big Bang
- Dada Films
  - The Last Mountain
- Focus Features
  - Pariah
- Fox Searchlight Pictures
  - Another Earth
  - Sound of My Voice
  - Bengali Detective (remake rights)
  - The Art of Getting By (Homework)
  - Martha Marcy May Marlene
- HBO
  - Knuckle (remake rights)
- IFC
  - Buck (through Sundance Selects)
  - The Ledge
  - Perfect Sense
  - These Amazing Shadows
  - Salvation Boulevard (with SPWA)
- Liddell Entertainment
  - Silent House
- Lionsgate
  - Devil's Double
- Magnolia Pictures
  - I Melt With You
  - Page One (with Participant Media)
- Maya Entertainment
  - All She Can (Benavides Born)
- Motion Film Group
  - Gun Hill Road
- National Geographic Channel
  - Life in a Day
- Oscilloscope
  - Bellflower
- Paramount
  - Like Crazy
- Participant Media
  - Circumstance
- Roadside Attractions
  - Margin Call (with Lionsgate)
  - Project Nim (Lionsgate has DVD rights, HBO has overall rights)
  - The Future
- Sony Pictures Classics
  - The Guard
  - Pom Wonderful Presents: The Greatest Movie Ever Sold
  - Take Shelter
- The Weinstein Company
  - The Details
  - My Idiot Brother
