= Diane Bell (director) =

American screenwriter and filmmaker

- Born: Dumfries, Scotland
- Education: University of Edinburgh
- Occupation: Filmmaker
- Known for: Obselidia

Diane Bell is a Scottish filmmaker who works and resides in Los Angeles.

== Early life and education ==
Bell grew up in Japan, Australia and Germany. She graduated with a master's degree in mental philosophy from the University of Edinburgh. She practices Ashtanga yoga, and taught yoga in Barcelona, Spain.

== Career ==
Her first film as writer/director, Obselidia, premiered at the Sundance Film Festival 2010 in Dramatic Narrative Competition and won two awards, the Alfred P. Sloan Award and Excellence in Cinematography. It was singled out by Todd McCarthy in Variety as the only film in dramatic competition that "is so far off the grid of what is expected of an independent film that it can truly be said to rebel." It won Best Feature at the Ashland Independent Film Festival, was selected for Best of Fest at the Edinburgh International Film Festival and went on to be nominated for two Independent Spirit Awards 2011, the John Cassavetes Award and Best First Screenplay.

She was selected for Sundance Screenwriting Lab 2011, with STEM, for which she was awarded the Sloan Development Fund at the Tribeca Film Institute.

Her second film, Bleeding Heart, premiered at the Tribeca Film Festival in April 2015. It stars Jessica Biel and Zosia Mamet.

She is the author of a bestselling book on indie filmmaking, Shoot From the Heart: Successful Filmmaking From a Sundance Rebel and hosts a popular podcast of the same name.

== Filmography ==
| Year | Film | Director | Writer | Note |
|---|---|---|---|---|
| 2010 | Obselidia | Yes | Yes | |
| 2015 | Bleeding Heart | Yes | Yes | |
| 2016 | Of Dust and Bones | Yes | Yes | |
