= Another Earth =

2011 film by Mike Cahill

- Theatrical release poster
- Directed by: Mike Cahill
- Written by: Mike Cahill; Brit Marling
- Produced by: Hunter Gray; Mike Cahill; Brit Marling; Nicholas Shumaker
- Starring: Brit Marling; William Mapother
- Cinematography: Mike Cahill
- Edited by: Mike Cahill
- Music by: Fall On Your Sword
- Production company: Artists Public Domain
- Distributed by: Fox Searchlight Pictures
- Release dates: January 24, 2011 (Sundance); July 22, 2011 (United States)
- Running time: 92 minutes
- Country: United States
- Language: English
- Budget: $100,000
- Box office: $1.9 million

Another Earth is a 2011 American science fiction drama film directed by Mike Cahill and starring Brit Marling and William Mapother. It premiered at the 2011 Sundance Film Festival in January, and was given a limited theatrical release on July 22, 2011, by Fox Searchlight Pictures. The film earned two nominations at the 38th Saturn Awards for Marling's performance and for Cahill and Marling's writing. The critical consensus on Rotten Tomatoes calls it “slow-paced but soulful”.

== Plot ==
Rhoda Williams, a brilliant 17-year-old girl who has spent her young life fascinated by astronomy, is delighted to learn that she has been accepted into MIT. She celebrates, drinking with friends, and in a reckless moment, drives home intoxicated. Listening to a story on the radio about a recently discovered Earth-like planet, she gazes out her car window at the stars and inadvertently hits a stopped car at an intersection, putting John Burroughs in a coma and killing his pregnant wife and young son. After serving her four-year prison sentence, Rhoda becomes a janitor at her former high school and struggles with guilt and regret.

Hearing more news stories about Earth 2, Rhoda enters an essay contest sponsored by a millionaire entrepreneur who is offering a civilian space flight to Earth 2.

One day Rhoda sees John laying a toy at the accident site. She visits his house, intending to apologize. He answers the door and she loses her nerve. Instead, she pretends to be a maid offering a free day of cleaning as a marketing tool for a cleaning service. John, who has dropped out of his Yale music faculty position, has been letting his home and himself go, and accepts Rhoda's offer. He has no idea who she is, and when she finishes asks her to come back the next week. In time, a caring relationship develops and they have sex.

First contact is made with Earth 2, and humanity discovers that it is an exact copy of Earth, with the same people who have lived broadly the same lives. Rhoda wins the essay contest and is chosen to be one of the first to travel to Earth 2. John asks her not to go, believing they might have a future together. She finally decides to tell him the truth about who she is. He is upset and throws her out of the house.

Rhoda hears an astrophysicist talking on television, describing a "broken mirror" hypothesis which states that upon the sighting of Earth 2 the synchronicity of events happening in both the Earths was broken. Rhoda rushes back to John's house, but he refuses to let her in. She breaks into his house, and he begins to strangle her. He stops, and when she recovers she tells him about the theory and that there might be a possibility for his family to still be alive on Earth 2 and leaves him the ticket. In time, she learns that John accepted the gift and becomes one of the first civilian space travelers to Earth 2.

Four months later, on a foggy day, Rhoda approaches her house, discovering her other self from Earth 2 standing in front of her.

== Cast ==
- Brit Marling as Rhoda Williams
- William Mapother as John Burroughs
- Jordan Baker as Kim Williams
- Robin Lord Taylor as Jeff Williams
- Flint Beverage as Robert Williams
- Kumar Pallana as Purdeep
- Diane Ciesla as Dr. Joan Tallis
- Rupert Reid as Keith Harding
- Richard Berendzen as himself (narrator)

== Production ==
The idea behind Another Earth first developed out of director Mike Cahill and actress Brit Marling speculating as to what it would be like were one to encounter one's own self. In order to explore the possibility on a large scale, they devised the concept of a duplicate Earth. The visual representation of the duplicate planet was deliberately made to evoke the Moon, as Cahill was deeply inspired by the 1969 Apollo 11 lunar landing. This movie shares some of its plot details with the 1969 British sci-fi movie Doppelganger.

Another Earth was filmed in and around New Haven, Connecticut, Mike Cahill's hometown – with some scenes taking place along the West Haven shoreline and at West Haven High School and Union Station – so that he could avail himself of the services of local friends and family and thus reduce expenses. His childhood home was used as Rhoda's home and his bedroom as Rhoda's room. The scene of the car collision was made possible through the help of a local police officer with whom Cahill was acquainted, who cordoned off part of a highway late one night. The scene in which Rhoda leaves the prison facility was filmed by having Marling walk into an actual prison posing as a yoga instructor and then exiting.

According to Brit Marling, she approached William Mapother for the role of John after "being haunted" by his performance in In the Bedroom (2001). Mapother consented to work on Another Earth for $100 a day. When asked why he agreed to join the cast, considering the "notoriously hit or miss" nature of independent films, Mapother replied that he was drawn by the film's subject and by the names involved in the project. At Mapother's insistence, he and the production team worked extensively on the scenes of John and Rhoda in order to develop John's character in the film.

The film ignores the physical consequences of having a similar-sized planet and moon appear nearby (e.g. effect on tides, gravity and atmosphere) other than depicting night time as brighter due to the reflection of the Sun's light off the other planet. The DVD / Blu-ray deleted scenes feature reveals that the filmmakers did intend to illustrate some of the consequences by filming a scene in which Rhoda encounters flowers floating in mid-air, but the scene was cut from the final film.

== Music ==
The musical score was composed by Fall on Your Sword, with the exception of the song played in the musical saw scene, composed by Scott Munson and performed by Natalia Paruz. Mike Cahill came upon Paruz, known also as the "Saw Lady", while riding the subway in New York. Mesmerized by her playing, he obtained her contact information and arranged for her to coach William Mapother on how to hold and act as if playing the saw for the scene in the film.

== Release ==
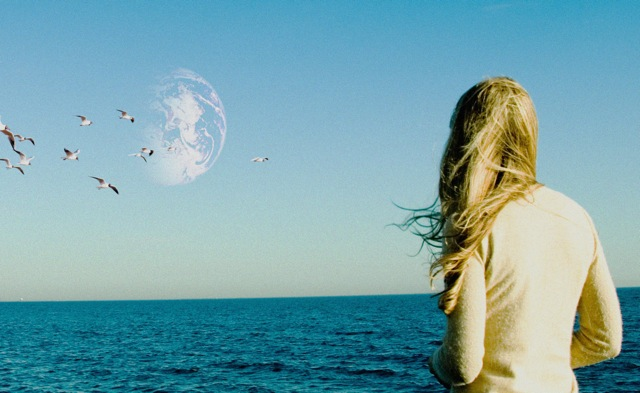
Promotional image

Another Earth had its world premiere at the 27th Sundance Film Festival in January 2011. It was released in dramatic competition. Variety reported: "[It] has been deemed one of the more highly praised pics of the fest as it received a standing ovation after the screening and strong word of mouth from buyers and festgoers." The distributor Fox Searchlight Pictures won distribution rights to the film in a deal worth $1.5 million to $2 million, beating out other distributors including Focus Features and the Weinstein Company.

Fox Searchlight is the distributor of Another Earth in the United States, Canada, and other English-speaking territories. The film had a limited release in the United States and Canada on July 22, 2011, expanding to a wide release in ensuing months.

In its first week in theaters, it grossed $112,266. Eventually, the film grossed $1.9 million worldwide.

== Reception ==
On the review aggregator website Rotten Tomatoes, 66% of 134 critics' reviews are positive, with an average rating of 6.3/10. The website's consensus reads: "Another Earth is often weighed down by placid pacing and ponderousness, but this soulful sci-fi nevertheless offers plenty of profound concepts to ponder." Metacritic, which uses a weighted average, assigned the film a score of 66 out of 100, based on 33 critics, indicating "generally favorable" reviews.

Film critic Roger Ebert of the Chicago Sun-Times gave the film three and a half stars out of four. Ebert commented that, "Another Earth is as thought-provoking, in a less profound way, as Tarkovsky's Solaris, another film about a sort of parallel Earth".

== Awards ==
Another Earth won the Alfred P. Sloan Prize at the 2011 Sundance Film Festival, for "focusing on science or technology as a theme, or depicting a scientist, engineer or mathematician as a major character." It went on to earn the Audience Award in the category of Narrative Feature at the 2011 Maui Film Festival.

Another Earth was named one of the top 10 independent films of the year at the 2011 National Board of Review Awards and was nominated for a Georgia Film Critics Association Award for Best Picture.

== See also ==
- Journey to the Far Side of the Sun - A 1969 science fiction film that was the first to deal with the premise of a double Earth. It was initially titled Doppelgänger.
