= Obselidia =

2010 film by Diane Bell

- Official promotional poster
- Directed by: Diane Bell
- Written by: Diane Bell
- Produced by: Matthew Medlin; Chris Byrne; Ken Morris
- Starring: Michael Piccirilli; Gaynor Howe; Frank Hoyt Taylor
- Cinematography: Zak Mulligan
- Edited by: John-Michael Powell
- Music by: Liam Howe
- Production companies: Humble Films; Red Czar Films
- Release date: January 22, 2010 (Sundance)
- Running time: 96 minutes
- Country: United States
- Language: English
- Budget: $140,000

Obselidia is a 2010 American road drama film written and directed by Diane Bell in her directorial debut. It stars Michael Piccirilli, Gaynor Howe, and Frank Hoyt Taylor. It tells the story of a lonely librarian who believes love is obsolete until a road trip to Death Valley with a beguiling cinema projectionist teaches him otherwise.

The film had its world premiere at the Sundance Film Festival on January 22, 2010, where it was awarded the Alfred P. Sloan Prize and the Excellence in Cinematography Award. It was then self-distributed, and received positive reviews from critics. At the 26th Independent Spirit Awards, it was nominated for Best First Screenplay (for Bell) and the John Cassavetes Award.

== Plot ==
On his quest to catalogue soon obsolete occupations, George (Piccirilli) a librarian joins forces with a silent film projectionist (Howe), and together they journey to Death Valley to interview a maverick scientist (Hoyt Taylor) who is predicting the imminent end of the world.

== Cast ==
- Michael Piccirilli as George
- Gaynor Howe as Sophie
- Frank Hoyt Taylor as Lewis
- Chris Byrne as Mitch
- Kim Beuché as Jennifer
- Michael Blackman Beck as Paul
- Linda Walton as Linda
- Grant Mathis as Monk

== Production ==
Obselidia was loosely inspired by several films, with Diane Bell saying:

This movie is born from a deep love of movies, so there are literally thousands of inspirations. A few of the key touchstones: for the look of the film, Wim Wenders' Paris, Texas and François Truffaut's The Man Who Loved Women; for driving scenes on a low budget, the great B-movie, Gun Crazy; for cycling, Jules et Jim; for romance, Woody Allen's Annie Hall and Richard Linklater's Before Sunrise. For a go and do it attitude, John Carney's Once and Luc Moullet's Brigitte et Brigitte.

Principal photography took place in Death Valley Junction, Ballarat, Los Angeles, and Santa Monica, California.

== Reception ==
=== Critical response ===
Todd McCarthy of Variety stated, "Gentle, intelligent, gorgeously made and utterly eccentric, Obselidia exists in its own little world entirely apart from any hitherto detected categories of American independent filmmaking." McCarthy also wrote, "Visually, the picture is a thing of great beauty." David D'Arcy of Screen Daily remarked, "Bell's ambitious script seeks a new and charmingly humorous perspective on consumerism and environmental decline, but leans on didactic aphorisms in the dialogue between George and Sophie."

=== Accolades ===
Year	Award / Festival	Category	Recipient(s)	Result	Ref.
2010	Sundance Film Festival	Alfred P. Sloan Prize	Obselidia	Won	
2010	Sundance Film Festival	Excellence in Cinematography Award: Dramatic	Zak Mulligan	Won	
2010	Ashland Independent Film Festival	Best Feature	Diane Bell	Won	
2011	FEST Youth Video and Film Festival	Best Fiction	Diane Bell	Won	
2011	Independent Spirit Awards	Best First Screenplay	Diane Bell	Nominated	
2011	Independent Spirit Awards	John Cassavetes Award	Diane Bell, Chris Byrne, Matthew Medlin	Nominated	
