= Fall On Your Sword =

American film and commercial music production company

- Industry: Music
- Founded: 2009
- Founder: Will Bates
- Headquarters: Los Angeles, California; Brooklyn, New York, United States
- Website: fallonyoursword.com

Fall On Your Sword is an American film and commercial music production company with offices in Los Angeles, California, and Brooklyn, New York. It was founded in 2009 by London-born musician and composer Will Bates, who is joined by executive producer and partner Lucy Alper. Fall On Your Sword creates music for feature films, television, and advertising.

== Career ==
Fall On Your Sword (FOYS) is primarily known for their work in film scoring and viral video mash-up creations.

As a composer, Bates has scored a feature films including Another Earth, I Origins, We Steal Secrets: The Story of WikiLeaks, 28 Hotel Rooms and Going Clear: Scientology and the Prison of Belief. He has also scored a number of TV series including The Magicians, The Path, The Looming Tower, Chance, and Sweetbitter. Prior to scoring films, FOYS performed as a live band.

Fall On Your Sword also produces art installations.

== Awards ==
- 2010 Clio Award for Best Original Score 'OFFF'
- 2009 Clio Award for Best Original Score 'Nomis Shoes'
- 2009 Cannes Gold Lion for Best Original Score 'Nomis Shoes'

== Filmography ==
Some of the works are only credited to Will Bates.

=== Films ===
- Depraved (2019)
- Hot Summer Nights (2017)
- Imperium (2016)
- Steve Jobs: The Man in the Machine (2015)
- The Girl in the Book (2015)
- Going Clear: Scientology and the Prison of Belief (2015)
- Among Ravens (2014)
- The Notorious Mr. Bout (2014)
- X/Y (2014)
- I Origins (2014)
- The Unkindness of Ravens (2013)
- We Steal Secrets: The Story of WikiLeaks (2013)
- The Normals (2012)
- Haiti Redux (2012)
- Generation Um... (2012)
- Lola Versus (2012)
- Nobody Walks (2012)
- 28 Hotel Rooms (2012)
- Another Earth (2011)
- Aardvark (2010)
- You Won't Miss Me (2009)

=== Television ===
- Salt Fat Acid Heat (2018)
- The Magicians (2015–2020)
- Bite Me (series) (2010)

=== Internet ===
- The Path (web series) (2016)
- Cooked (web miniseries) (2016)
