= 2010 Sundance Film Festival =

2010 film festival edition

- Festival poster
- Location: Park City, Salt Lake City, Ogden, and Sundance, Utah
- Hosted by: Sundance Institute
- Festival date: January 21–31, 2010
- Language: English
- Website: festival.sundance.org/2010
- 2011 Sundance Film Festival 2009 Sundance Film Festival

The 26th annual Sundance Film Festival was held from January 21, 2010, until January 31, 2010, in Park City, Utah.

== Awards ==
- Grand Jury Prize: Documentary - Restrepo
- Grand Jury Prize: Dramatic - Winter's Bone
- World Cinema Jury Prize: Documentary - The Red Chapel
- World Cinema Jury Prize: Dramatic - Animal Kingdom
- Audience Award: U.S. Documentary, Presented by Honda - Waiting for Superman
- Audience Award: U.S. Dramatic, Presented by Honda - Happythankyoumoreplease
- World Cinema Audience Award: Documentary - Wasteland
- World Cinema Audience Award: Dramatic - Undertow
- Best of NEXT Presented by YouTube - Homewrecker
- U.S. Directing Award: Documentary - Smash His Camera
- U.S. Directing Award: Dramatic - 3 Backyards
- World Cinema Directing Award: Documentary - Space Tourists
- World Cinema Directing Award: Dramatic - Southern District
- Waldo Salt Screenwriting Award - Winter's Bone
- World Cinema Screenwriting Award - Southern District
- U.S. Documentary Editing Award - Joan Rivers: A Piece of Work
- World Cinema Documentary Editing Award - A Film Unfinished
- Excellence in Cinematography Award: U.S. Documentary - The Oath
- Excellence in Cinematography Award: U.S. Dramatic - Obselidia
- World Cinema Cinematography Award: Documentary - His & Hers
- World Cinema Cinematography Award: Dramatic - The Man Next Door
- Jury Prize in U.S. Short Filmmaking - Drunk History
- International Jury Prize in Short Filmmaking - Born Sweet, Can We Talk?, Cómo conocí a tu padre (How I met your Father), Dock Ellis & The LSD No-No, Quadrangle, Rob And Valentyna In Scotland, Young Love
- Alfred P. Sloan Feature Film Prize - Obselidia
- U.S. Documentary Special Jury Film Prize - Gasland
- World Cinema Documentary Special Jury Prize - Enemies of the People
- World Dramatic Special Jury Prize for Breakout Performance - Tatiana Maslany in Grown Up Movie Star

== Academy Award nominations ==
After the nominations for the 83rd Academy Awards were announced, Peter Knegt of indieWire wrote "As made evident last week, the Sundance Film Festival can be a significant launching pad for Oscar nominees." Knegt noted how 2 of the 10 Best Picture nominees, 3 of the 5 Best Actress nominees, and 4 of the 5 Best Documentary nominees were Sundance films.

In January 2011, Dana Harris of indieWire noted the 15 nominations at the 83rd Academy Awards that came from 9 films from the 2010 Sundance Film Festival.

Winter's Bone, which won the Grand Jury Prize: Dramatic and Waldo Salt Screenwriting Award, was nominated for 4 Oscars: Best Picture, Jennifer Lawrence for Best Actress, John Hawkes as Best Supporting Actor, and Debra Granik and Anne Rosellini for Best Adapted Screenplay. The Kids Are All Right, which screened in the Premieres category, was nominated for 4 Oscars: Best Picture, Annette Bening for Best Actress, Mark Ruffalo for Best Supporting Actor, and Lisa Cholodenko and Stuart Blumberg for Best Original Screenplay.

Blue Valentine, which screened in the U.S. Dramatic Competition, was nominated for 1 Oscar: Michelle Williams for Best Actress. Animal Kingdom, which won the World Cinema Jury Prize: Dramatic, was nominated for 1 Oscar: Jacki Weaver for Best Supporting Actress.

Exit Through the Gift Shop, which screened in the U.S. Documentary Competition, was nominated for 1 Oscar: Best Documentary Feature. Gasland, which won the U.S. Documentary Special Jury Prize, was nominated for 1 Oscar: Best Documentary Feature. Restrepo, which won the Grand Jury Prize: Documentary, was nominated for 1 Oscar: Best Documentary Feature. Waste Land, which won the World Cinema Audience Award: Documentary, was nominated for 1 Oscar: Best Documentary Feature.

Madagascar, a Journey Diary, which screened in the short film competition, was nominated for 1 Oscar: Best Animated Short Film.

Harris also noted the Sundance past of Oscar nominees Inception director Christopher Nolan and The Fighter director David O. Russell.

== See also ==
- List of films at the 2010 Sundance Film Festival
