= Chapter 1: Homme Fatale =

- A Murder at the End of the World episode
- Episode no.: Episode 1
- Directed by: Brit Marling
- Written by: Brit Marling; Zal Batmanglij
- Cinematography by: Charlotte Bruus Christensen
- Editing by: Dylan Tichenor
- Original release date: November 14, 2023
- Running time: 70 minutes

Guest appearances
- Christopher Gurr as Marius; Britian Seibert as Eva; Kellan Tetlow as Zoomer; Neal Huff as Darby's father

Episode chronology
← Previous —	Next → "Chapter 2: The Silver Doe"

"Chapter 1: Homme Fatale" is the series premiere of the American psychological thriller drama television miniseries A Murder at the End of the World. The episode was co-written by series creators Brit Marling and Zal Batmanglij, and directed by Marling. In the United States, it premiered on Hulu on November 14, 2023, alongside the second episode. Internationally, the episode was released on Disney+, while in Latin America it was released on Star+.

The series follows Darby Hart, an amateur detective who gets invited by a reclusive billionaire to a retreat at a remote location, along with eight other guests. The series premiere introduces Darby's character, her relationship with Bill Farrah, and her arrival at the retreat, hosted at a hotel in Iceland, with eight other guests invited by billionaire Andy Ronson and his wife, Lee Andersen.

The episode was met with generally positive reviews, with praise for the camerawork, production design, costumes, cinematography, directing, tone and performances (particularly Corrin and Dickinson), but the slow pacing received criticism.

== Plot ==
At an author reading event, Darby Hart (Emma Corrin) reads a true-crime book she had written entitled The Silver Doe, chronicling her experience trying to solve cases of female murder victims in the United States with her former partner Bill Farrah (Harris Dickinson). After the reading, Darby goes home and receives an invitation from Andy Ronson (Clive Owen), delivered by his AI assistant Ray (Edoardo Ballerini), to participate in his retreat, which she eventually accepts.

Darby boards the plane and is welcomed by Todd (Louis Cancelmi), Andy's head of security who had previously attended her reading event. Inside the plane, Darby meets fellow participants to join her on the retreat, including filmmaker Martin Mitchell (Jermaine Fowler), smart city builder Lu Mei (Joan Chen), as well as astronaut and doctor Sian Cruz (Alice Braga). The group lands in Iceland and is taken to a hotel where the retreat is taking place, located in Fljót.

At a welcoming dinner, Andy enters the room with his wife Lee Andersen (Brit Marling) and their son Zoomer (Kellan Tetlow). Shortly after, Darby is shocked to see Bill sitting across from her. After dinner, the two go for a walk, and Bill admits the reason he left her was because he got scared. Later that night, Darby heads to Bill's room. She knocks on his door, but he doesn't answer. She then goes outside to look into his room through the window. To her surprise, Darby sees Bill covered in blood and gasping for his life. When Darby tries to call for help, Bill asks her to stay with him as he eventually goes unconscious.

In a flashback, Darby and Bill head to the former house of a suspected serial killer. They manage to get into the house by hacking the garage door. Inside the house, the two find the remains of the first victim. A mysterious figure suddenly appears and holds Darby and Bill at gunpoint while the two start reciting the victims' names. Presumably the next morning, Darby wakes up to find that Bill had left her.

== Production ==
=== Development and writing ===
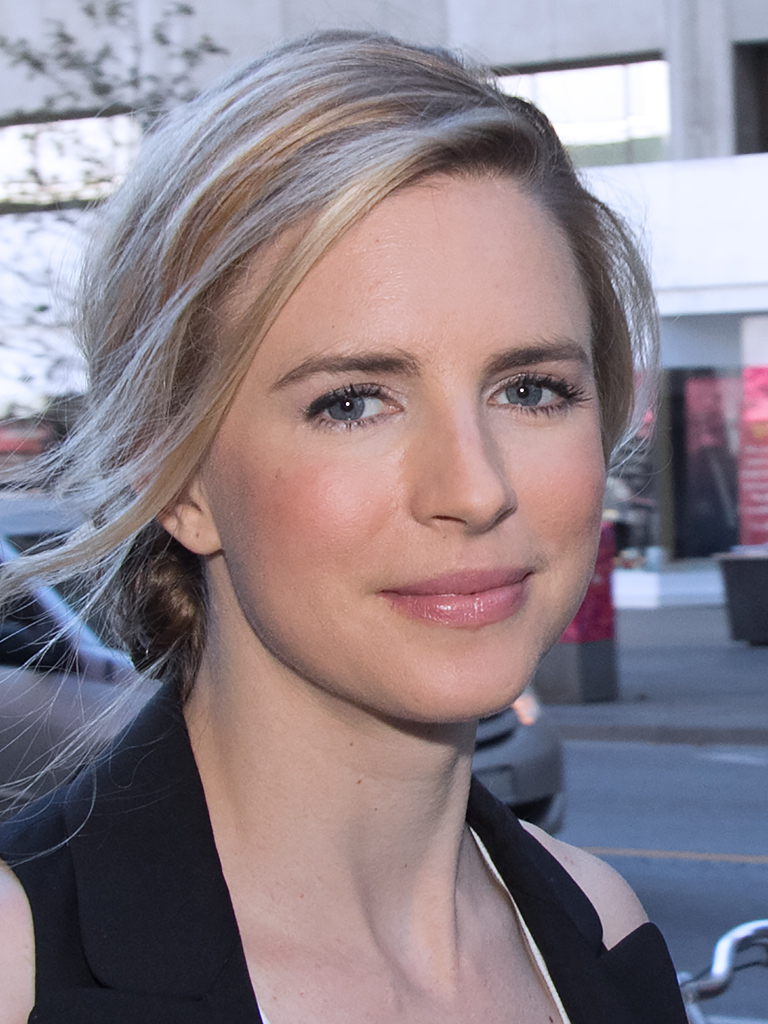
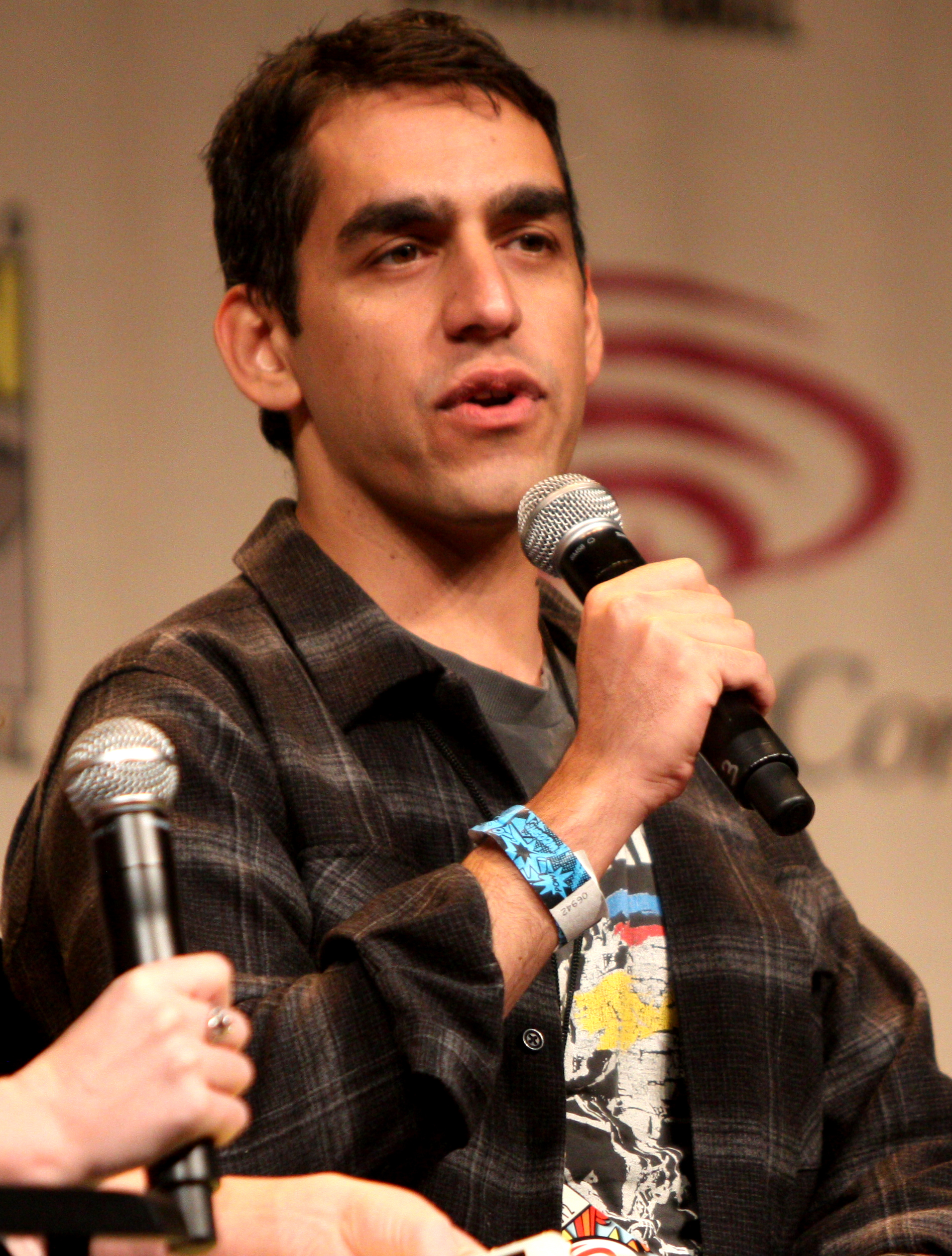
Series creators Brit Marling and Zal Batmanglij wrote the episode.

The project, then titled Retreat, was given a series order by FX in August 2021, with Brit Marling and Zal Batmanglij serving as co-creators, executive producers, writers and directors. Marling and Batmanglij had previously worked together on several projects for over a decade, including as the creators of the Netflix mystery-science fiction drama series The OA (2016–2019). Additionally, Andrea Sperling, Melanie Marnich and Nicki Paluga were also announced as executive producers. The idea for the series began to be developed by Marling and Batmanglij in 2019, when the two became interested in stories about amateur sleuths and young female detectives, as well as the idea of how much knowledge Gen Z could obtain from the internet. The series premiere "Chapter 1: Homme Fatale" was co-written by Marling and Batmanglij.

=== Filming ===
Principal photography for the series began on February 7, 2022, with filming primarily taking place in Iceland, as well as Utah, New Jersey, and New York. In December 2022, the Los Angeles Times stated that filming had been completed. Marling served as the director of the episode, marking her directorial debut. Meanwhile, Charlotte Bruus Christensen worked as the cinematographer.

Among the filming locations, the Mysterious Bookshop, in Tribeca, New York served as the location for Darby's book reading scene, the Whispering Sands Motel in Hanksville, Utah served as the motel where Bill and Darby stay in several flashback scenes, and a warehouse located in Newark, New Jersey was reimagined as Darby's house. The scene when Darby boards the plane to Iceland takes place at the Essex County Airport in Fairfield, Essex County, New Jersey. Meanwhile, among the filming locations in Iceland include the Kolgrafafjordur Sword Bridge in the western Snæfellsnesvegur peninsula and the Múlagöng tunnel. In addition, Andy's secluded retreat was based on a hotel in the Fljot Valley and inspired by the Deplar Farm hotel located on the Troll Peninsula in northern Iceland, while its exterior shots are CGI creations.

=== Casting ===
Alongside the series order in August 2021, Marling was also announced to star in a key role. In October 2021, Emma Corrin was cast as the lead character, Darby Hart. In February 2022, Clive Owen, Harris Dickinson, Alice Braga, Jermaine Fowler, Joan Chen, Raúl Esparza, Edoardo Ballerini, Pegah Ferydoni, Ryan J. Haddad and Javed Khan were cast as Andy, Bill, Sian, Martin, Lu Mei, David, Ray, Ziba, Oliver and Rohan, respectively. In April 2022, Britain Seibert was cast in a recurring role as Eva.

=== Music ===
The episode's musical score, as with the entire series, was composed by Danny Bensi and Saunder Jurriaans. The two also previously worked as composers for The OA.

The episode features "The End" by The Doors playing during the opening scene, as well as "Glory Box" by Portishead and "Genesis" by Grimes played by Darby, the former during a scene in her room before she gets the invitation from Andy, while the latter during her flight to Iceland. Additionally, it also features Annie Lennox's version of "No More 'I Love You's'" played by Bill during the scene when he and Darby are driving to a suspected serial killer's house. The song is also used during the end credits.

== Release ==
In the United States, "Chapter 1: Homme Fatale" premiered on Hulu on November 14, 2023, alongside the second episode "Chapter 2: The Silver Doe". It was originally set to debut on August 29, 2023, but was delayed due to the 2023 SAG-AFTRA strike. Internationally, the episode was released on Disney+, while in Latin America it was released on Star+.

== Reception ==
Reviewing for the first two episodes, Ben Rosenstock of Vulture gave them a rating of 4 out of 5 stars, commending the Corrin and Dickinson's performances and the chemistry between the two, and wrote, "To some, this episode will feel overlong and sluggishly paced. But many of my favorite moments in this pilot are the slow, character-building moments." Arnav Srivastava of The Review Geek rated the episode with 4 out of 5 stars, calling it "a fantastic start", and praised Corrin's performance. Ricky Valero of Ready Steady Cut gave it a rating of 3.5 out of 5 stars and wrote, "The [series premiere] starts a little slow but ends on a high note leaving you wanting more." Grading the premiere with a "C-", Matt Schimkowitz of The A.V. Club criticized the slow pacing and Darby's lack of personality, but praised the cinematography and tone, and called the series "perfectly watchable". In a review for the whole series, Lean Wilson of IGN lauded the camerawork, production design, costumes, cinematography, directing, and the performances of Corrin, Dickinson, Marling and Owen, but also criticized the pacing, stating that "The pilot, which Marling directed, does a fine job acclimating viewers to Darby's complicated world, but [it] never picks up its pace."
