= Chapter 2: The Silver Doe =

- A Murder at the End of the World episode
- Episode no.: Episode 2
- Directed by: Zal Batmanglij
- Written by: Brit Marling; Zal Batmanglij; Melanie Marnich; Rebecca Roanhorse
- Editing by: Dylan Tichenor; Chris Patterson
- Original release date: November 14, 2023
- Running time: 63 minutes

Guest appearances
- Christopher Gurr as Marius; Britian Seibert as Eva; Neal Huff as Darby's father

Episode chronology
← Previous "Chapter 1: Homme Fatale"	Next → "Chapter 3: Survivors"

"Chapter 2: The Silver Doe" is the second episode of the American psychological thriller drama television miniseries A Murder at the End of the World. The episode was co-written by series creators Brit Marling and Zal Batmanglij, as well as Melanie Marnich and Rebecca Roanhorse, and directed by Batmanglij. In the United States, it premiered on Hulu on November 14, 2023, alongside the series premiere. Internationally, the episode was released on Disney+, while in Latin America it was released on Star+.

The series follows Darby Hart, an amateur detective who gets invited by a reclusive billionaire to a retreat at a remote location, along with eight other guests. The episode promptly continues from the final scene of the series premiere, revealing Bill to be dead, and follows Darby's efforts to prove that he did not take his own life but was killed by someone at the retreat. The episode also features a series of flashbacks about Darby's obsession with Jane Does discovered alongside silver jewelry pieces, hence the name "Silver Doe", since her teenage years, which also leads to the beginning of her relationship with Bill.

The episode received generally positive reviews, with praise for the writing, set design, cast and performances (particularly Corrin). However, its slow pacing was met with criticism, but considered an improvement over the series premiere.

== Plot ==
Darby (Emma Corrin) goes back inside to seek help for Bill (Harris Dickinson) from the hotel manager Marius (Christopher Gurr) and Sian (Alice Braga), a doctor. Sian performs CPR but Bill remains unresponsive and is subsequently pronounced dead. Sian suspects that morphine caused his death and suggests that his head injury may have resulted from a seizure.

The following morning at breakfast, Andy (Clive Owen) announces Bill's death, attributing it to an overdose. Convinced that Bill did not die from an overdose, Darby attempts to enter his room by distracting Marius, to conduct her investigation. She examines Bill's body and, with the assistance of the prototype A.I. called Ray (Edoardo Ballerini), discovers no signs of self-injection and no fingerprints on the syringe. Lee (Brit Marling) enters the room, startling Darby and forcing her to hide. Lee examines Bill's body and belongings before the two exit the room separately and join the others at Martin's (Jermaine Fowler) film presentation.

During the presentation, Darby confides in Lee about her findings and suspects that the killer is among the group. Lee encourages Darby to hack into the hotel's security system to review the camera footage. Successfully gaining access, Darby finds David and Ziba on the footage at separate times. Moments later, she is shocked by the appearance of a masked figure on the recording. Subsequently, from her room balcony, Darby witnesses Icelandic authorities taking away Bill's body.

In a series of flashbacks, ten-year-old Darby accompanies her father (Neal Huff), a coroner, to a crime scene where a body was discovered in a lake. Older Darby later joins her father on a farmland where bone remains were found. She discovers a pair of silver earrings and takes them home. While conducting research on Reddit, Darby stumbles upon a forum titled "Jane Does with silver?", submitted by a user known as K!LLB!LL. Darby uploads a photo of the earrings, prompting a response from K!LLB!LL. During a video call between the two, it is revealed that K!LLB!LL is Bill. This marks the beginning of their relationship, leading to their first real-life meeting at a bar.

== Production ==
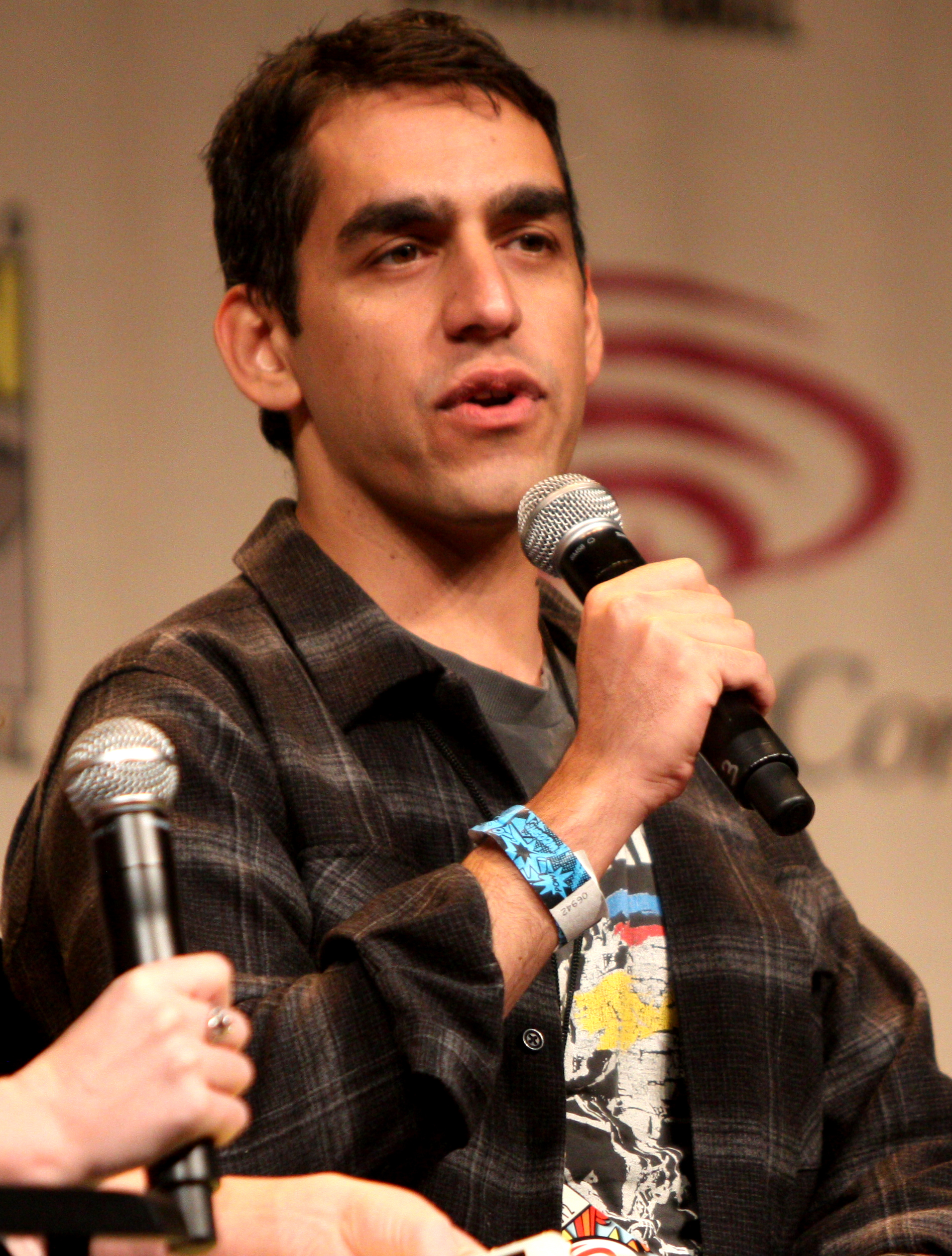
Co-series creator Zal Batmanglij directed and co-wrote the episode.

=== Writing ===
"Chapter 2: The Silver Doe" was co-written by series creators Brit Marling and Zal Batmanglij, executive producer Melanie Marnich and Rebecca Roanhorse.

=== Filming ===
The series' principal photography began on February 7, 2022 and wrapped in late 2022. Batmanglij served as the director of the episode. Meanwhile, Charlotte Bruus Christensen worked as the cinematographer.

The flashback scenes were primarily shot in New Jersey, including Darby's childhood house in Readington and Mill Lane Tavern bar in Rockaway. The scene where Darby and her father discover bone remains on a farmland takes place at the Readington River Buffalo Farm in Flemington. Meanwhile, Ray's Tavern, the bar where Bill and Darby meet for the first time, is located in Green River, Utah. In addition, Andy's secluded retreat was inspired by the Deplar Farm hotel on the Troll Peninsula in northern Iceland, with its exterior shots being CGI creations.

=== Music ===
The episode's musical score, as with the entire series, was composed by Saunder Jurriaans and Danny Bensi. The two also previously worked as composers for The OA. The episode features "Hell Is Round the Corner" by Tricky playing during a scene of Darby walking in the hallway at her school and Frank Ocean's version of "Moon River" played at a bar where Darby meets Bill for the first time. The song is also used during the end credits.

== Release ==
In the United States, "Chapter 2: The Silver Doe" premiered on Hulu on November 14, 2023, alongside the series premiere "Chapter 1: Homme Fatale". It was originally set to debut on August 29, 2023, but was delayed due to the 2023 SAG-AFTRA strike. Internationally, the episode was released on Disney+, while in Latin America it was released on Star+.

== Reception ==
Ricky Valero of Ready Steady Cut gave the episode a rating of 4 out of 5 stars and wrote in his verdict: "The pace picks up in a massive way as the race of who murdered Bill heats up. Emma Corrin's performance keeps the whodunnit mystery together with her strong performance as Darby." Arnav Srivastava of The Review Geek also rated it with 4 out of 5 stars and lauded Marling and Batmanglij's writing. In a review for the first two episodes, Allyson Johnson of But Why Tho? praised the cast and performances of Owen and Marling, and wrote, "Despite its shortcomings and poor pacing, there's no denying that its lush set design and remote location drum up immediate intrigue."

Grading the episode with a "C", Matt Schimkowitz of The A.V. Club criticized the pacing and some parts of the writing, but considered it an improvement over the first episode, saying "The show has more gas now that there's a mystery to solve. But we have to sit through hour-long episodes to get one small development. [...] Two episodes in, and it’s starting to feel like this show would’ve been much better as a two-hour movie, where we, theoretically, move things along a little bit. Instead, we’re stuck in this hotel filled with the world’s greatest thinkers who think tech billionaires are going to save the planet with AI assistants. This show needs some reality and concrete stakes or it’s going to be a long five more episodes."
