= Tread of Angels =

2022 fantasy novella by Rebecca Roanhorse

- Author: Rebecca Roanhorse
- Language: English
- Set in: Goetia, Colorado
- Publisher: Saga, Simon & Schuster
- Publication date: 15 Nov 2022
- Pages: 208 (Hardcover)
- ISBN: 978-1-982166-18-2

Tread of Angels is a 2022 fantasy novella by Rebecca Roanhorse. It is a murder mystery set in a fictional Old West town which is inhabited by the descendants of both angels and demons.

== Plot ==
In 1883 in the town of Goetia, workers mine the element divinity. Divinity is produced from the corpse of Abaddon, a fallen angel who died in Lucifer’s rebellion. Descendants of demons are known as the Fallen, while descendants of angels are called the Elect. Fallen are considered social outcasts, but they are tolerated by the Elect because they are the only people who can see divinity.

Half-Fallen card sharp Celeste Semyaza finds that her sister Mariel has been arrested on suspicion of murdering a Virtue, the highest rank of Elect citizen. Her former lover, the demon Abraxas, offers to help. Celeste goes to the local courthouse and speaks to Ibrahim, leader of the Order of Chamuel. He appoints her to serve as Mariel's advocatus diaboli in the Court of Virtues. Celeste speaks to Mariel, who claims that she simply woke up to find a body next to her in bed.

Celeste learns that Mariel's account of the night of the murder cannot be true; additionally, Mariel has been having a liaison with an Elect physician named Daniel Alameda. She then learns that Daniel was the murder victim. Celeste interviews Virtue Tabor, Daniel's business partner. Tabor implies that Mariel had been pregnant and had been attempting to blackmail them. Tabor attempts to kill Celeste. Abraxas kills Tabor and rescues Celeste.

Celeste asks Abraxas to help her frame another girl for Daniel's murder in order to save Mariel. He is disgusted by Celeste's behavior but ultimately agrees. Before the trial, Celeste confronts Mariel. Mariel admits that Daniel pressured her to have an abortion and planned to abandon her. Enraged, she castrated him and he bled out. At the trial, Mariel confesses rather than allow someone else to be scapegoated for her crime. The judge remands her to the custody of Daniel's widow, who agrees to care for Mariel's child and attempt to rehabilitate Mariel. Mariel asks Celeste not to visit, and Abraxas returns to Hell without Celeste. Celeste sits alone in the rain, feeling that it cannot wash her clean.

== Major themes ==
Celeste and Mariel have both Fallen and Elect ancestry. Celeste is raised by their Elect father, while Mariel is raised by their Fallen mother. According to Alex Brown of Locus, this is used to explore the trope of the tragic mulatto. In this trope, a character passes as white until they are revealed to have Black ancestry, at which point they are expelled from white society. According to Maya Gittelman of Tor.com, Celeste and Mariel are used to explore the "intricacies of mixed identity within the same family" and the concept of passing.

== Style ==
Alex Brown wrote that Tread of Angels is an example of a noir novel. According to Brown, noir can be contrasted with hardboiled fiction because "hardboiled detectives know the difference between right and wrong ... while noir either makes no distinction or doesn’t care."

== Background ==
In an interview with Shondaland, Roanhorse discusses how she took a break from writing her Between Earth and Sky trilogy to write Tread of Angels. The work's setting was inspired by a trip to Leadville, Colorado. Roanhorse incorporated her educational background in theology into the work. Roanhorse is also mixed-race and adopted, which inspired some of Celeste's background.

== Reception ==
In a starred review, Kirkus called the novel "a superb dark fantasy". A review for Tor.com called the work "an elegant genre pastiche" and " one of the freshest historical fantasies I’ve ever consumed".

Writing for Locus, Alex Brown wished the novella had been longer and found that the twists were "heavily telegraphed". However, Brown "loved the ending" and the worldbuilding. In a review for Paste Magazine, Lacy Baugher Milas wrote that the mystery plot was "fairly basic", but praised the worldbuilding and stated "this is the sort of fully realized setting that deserves many, many sequels, spinoffs, and standalones". Publishers Weekly called the plot "predictable to the end" but also called the novel an "immersive historical fantasy centered on ambition, privilege, and marginalization", praising the worldbuilding.
