= A Murder at the End of the World =

American television miniseries

- Promotional poster
- Genre: Murder mystery; Psychological thriller
- Created by: Brit Marling; Zal Batmanglij
- Written by: Brit Marling; Zal Batmanglij; Melanie Marnich; Rebecca Roanhorse
- Starring: Emma Corrin; Brit Marling; Harris Dickinson; Alice Braga; Joan Chen; Raúl Esparza; Jermaine Fowler; Ryan J. Haddad; Pegah Ferydoni; Javed Khan; Louis Cancelmi; Edoardo Ballerini; Clive Owen
- Composers: Saunder Jurriaans; Danny Bensi
- Country of origin: United States
- Original language: English
- No. of episodes: 7

Production
- Executive producers: Brit Marling; Zal Batmanglij; Andrea Sperling; Melanie Marnich; Nicki Paluga
- Producer: Deb Dyer
- Cinematography: Charlotte Bruus Christensen
- Editors: Dylan Tichenor; Chris Patterson; Lana Wolverton
- Running time: 42–72 minutes
- Production companies: Mysterium Valley; FXP

Original release
- Network: FX on Hulu
- Release: November 14 – December 19, 2023

A Murder at the End of the World is an American psychological mystery thriller television miniseries created by Brit Marling and Zal Batmanglij for FX on Hulu. It stars Emma Corrin as an amateur detective who attempts to solve a murder at an isolated glacial retreat in Iceland. The supporting cast includes Marling, Clive Owen, and Harris Dickinson.

The series, the fifth collaboration between Marling and Batmanglij, premiered its first two episodes on FX on Hulu on November 14, 2023, with the rest being released weekly until December 19, 2023. It was originally set to be released on August 29, 2023, but was delayed due to the 2023 SAG-AFTRA strike. It received positive critical reviews and was named among the best TV shows of 2023 by a number of publications.

== Premise ==
The series follows Darby Hart, an amateur detective, who is invited, along with eight other guests, by a reclusive billionaire to participate in a retreat at an isolated glacial compound in Iceland. When one of the other guests dies, Darby must use all of her skills to prove it was murder against a tide of competing interests and before the killer takes another life.

== Cast and characters ==
=== Main ===
- Emma Corrin as Darby Hart, an amateur detective. Anastasia Lee portrays a young Darby.
- Brit Marling as Lee Andersen, Andy's wife and a former hacker
- Harris Dickinson as William Bill Farrah, Darby's former partner
- Clive Owen as Andy Ronson, a billionaire and tech entrepreneur
- Edoardo Ballerini as Ray, an AI system
- Alice Braga as Dr. Sian Cruise, an astronaut and doctor
- Joan Chen as Lu Mei, a smart city builder
- Raúl Esparza as David Alvarez, Andy's business partner
- Jermaine Fowler as Martin Mitchell, a filmmaker
- Ryan J. Haddad as Oliver Marwan, a disabled roboticist
- Pegah Ferydoni as Ziba, an Iranian activist
- Javed Khan as Rohan Ravjit, a climatologist
- Louis Cancelmi as Todd Andrews, Andy's head of security

=== Recurring ===
- Christopher Gurr as Marius
- Britian Seibert as Dr. Eva Andrews, Todd's wife
- Kellan Tetlow as Zoomer Ronson, Andy and Lee's son
- Neal Huff as Darby's father
- Daniel Olson as Tomas
- Annette Wright as Dorthey

== Production ==
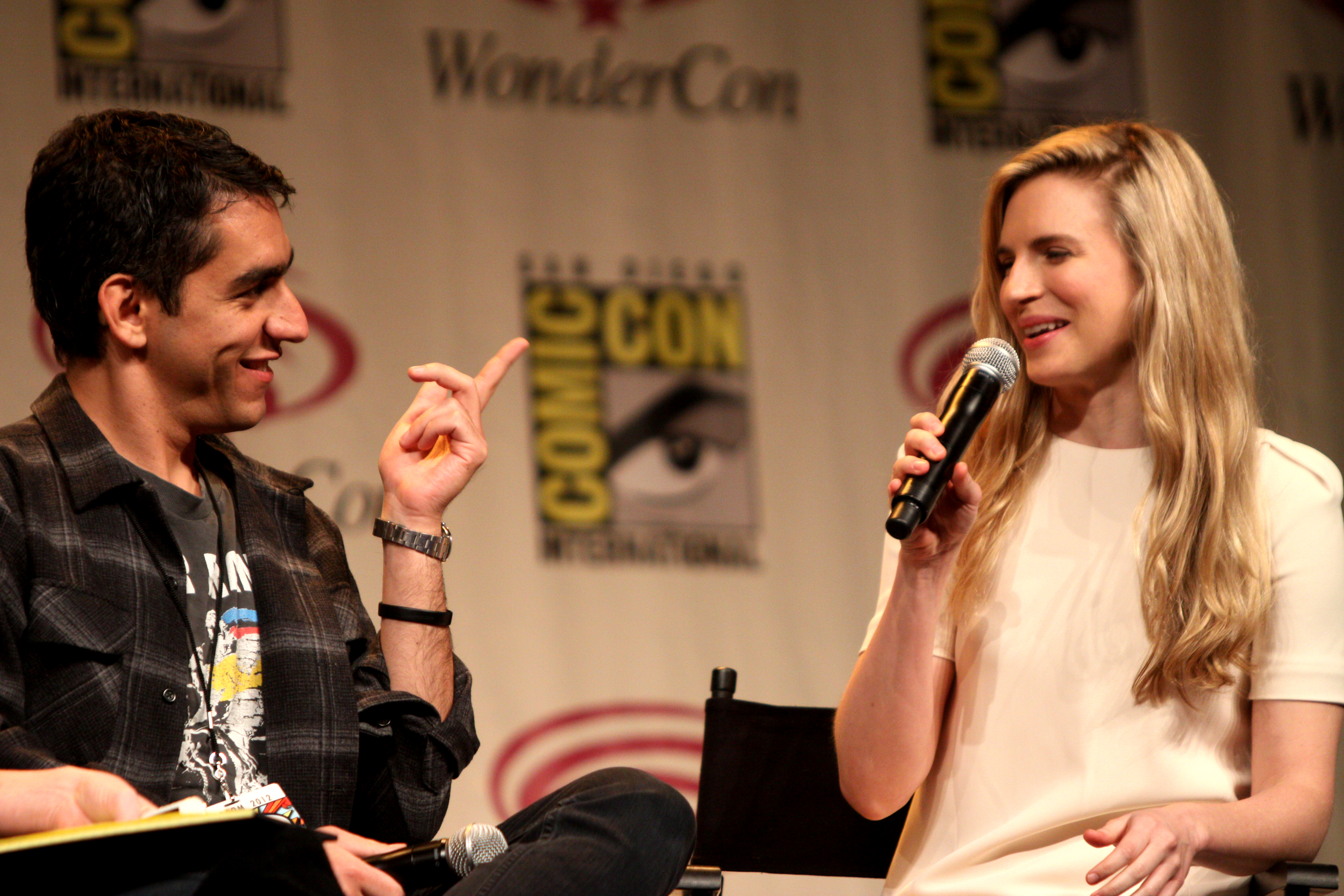
Zal Batmanglij (L) and Brit Marling (R) served as creators, executive producers, directors and writers.

=== Development ===
On August 13, 2021, it was announced that FX had ordered the limited series, then titled Retreat, created by Brit Marling and Zal Batmanglij, who would serve as executive producers and also write and direct. The series marks the fifth collaboration between Marling and Batmanglij, who had worked together for over a decade, including as creators of the Netflix mystery-science fiction drama series The OA (2016–2019). Along Marling and Batmanglij, Andrea Sperling, Melanie Marnich and Nicki Paluga would serve as executive producers.

The story began development by Marling and Batmanglij in 2019, inspired by their interests in stories about amateur sleuths and young female detectives, and the idea of how much knowledge Gen Z could obtain from the internet. Marling and Batmanglij had access to an early preview of ChatGPT and incorporated the result of their testing in the script.

=== Casting ===
Along with the series' announcement, Marling was set to co-star in a key role. On October 11, 2021, Emma Corrin was cast in the lead role of Darby Hart. On February 11, 2022, Clive Owen, Harris Dickinson, Alice Braga, Jermaine Fowler, Joan Chen, Raúl Esparza, Edoardo Ballerini, Pegah Ferydoni, Ryan J. Haddad, and Javed Khan were cast in main roles. On April 6, 2022, Daniel Olson and Britian Seibert were cast in recurring roles.

=== Filming ===
The series began principal photography on February 7, 2022, with filming taking place in Kearny, New Jersey, Utah, and Iceland. In April 2022, filming took place for three days at the Readington River Buffalo Farm in Readington, New Jersey. A scene that shows Darby riding and walking a bike, with a glimpse of the Mill Lane Tavern, was filmed in Rockaway Boro, New Jersey. On September 2, 2022, Marling posted on her Instagram account that it was the final day of shooting. In late December 2022, the Los Angeles Times stated that the series had finished filming.

== Episodes ==
No.	Title	Directed by	Written by	Original release date
1	"Chapter 1: Homme Fatale"	Brit Marling	Brit Marling & Zal Batmanglij	November 14, 2023
Darby Hart is an amateur detective, skilled hacker, and author of the true crime book The Silver Doe, written about her experience solving cold cases of female murder victims in the United States with her former partner Bill. She gets invited to a secluded retreat by billionaire Andy Ronson via his AI Assistant, Ray, along with eight other guests. At a welcoming dinner, Darby is shocked to see Bill sitting across from her, considering the two had not seen each other in six years. Later that night, Darby knocks on Bill's door but he does not answer. She then goes outside to check on him through the window. To her surprise, she sees Bill covered in blood and gasping for his life. When Darby tries to call for help, Bill pleads with her to stay with him as he eventually goes unconscious. In a flashback to six years earlier, Darby and Bill explore the former residence of a suspected serial killer and discover the remains of the first victim in the basement. A mysterious figure suddenly appears at the top of the stairs and holds Darby and Bill at gunpoint. Presumably, the following morning, Darby wakes up to find that Bill has left her.
2	"Chapter 2: The Silver Doe"	Zal Batmanglij	Brit Marling & Zal Batmanglij and Melanie Marnich & Rebecca Roanhorse	November 14, 2023
Darby goes back inside where, despite Sian's CPR efforts, Bill is pronounced dead. Sian suspects that a morphine overdose may have caused his death. When Andy announces Bill's death the next morning Darby is convinced that Bill did not die from an overdose so she enters his room to investigate. With Ray's assistance, she examines Bill's body and finds neither evidence of self-injection nor fingerprints on the syringe. Lee unexpectedly enters to examine the scene as well. Darby confides in Lee about her discovery and her suspicion that someone at the retreat is the killer. Lee encourages Darby to hack into the hotel's security system to review the camera footage where Darby identifies David, Ziba, and a mysterious masked figure in the footage. In a series of flashbacks, a younger Darby frequently accompanies her father, a coroner, to crime scenes. On one occasion, Darby finds a pair of silver earrings near some bone remains, takes them home, and begins online research about the earrings. In doing so, Darby meets Bill who shares her interests. The two eventually meet for the first time at a bar.
3	"Chapter 3: Survivors"	Zal Batmanglij	Brit Marling & Zal Batmanglij & Melanie Marnich	November 21, 2023
While investigating the relationships between the guests, Darby follows a mysterious person in a white mask, black thermal coat, and boots with red laces to the top of a snowy canyon where he sends out Morse code messages into the night. A white light signals back. On a trip up to the Great Summit, Darby runs up to talk with Rohan. He explains he has a bad heart and uses a pacemaker. She then sees he wears the shoes with red laces. Rohan warns Darby in a serious tone about being careful. After playing an AR video game with Andy's son, Zoomer, Andy talks with Darby. He tells her she needs to go home and recover from Bill's sudden tragedy. Rohan calls Darby reluctantly confiding in her until she hears a crash over the phone. A blood curdling scream is heard as Darby rushes through the door and finds the guests standing over Rohan's body. Andy suggests they need to move underground.
4	"Chapter 4: Family Secrets"	Zal Batmanglij	Brit Marling & Zal Batmanglij	November 28, 2023
The guests are taken to an underground bunker and listen to Darby attempt to piece the evidence together. The guests are then relocated upstairs and are placed on lockdown in their rooms. Their electronics are taken away as Todd declares to Darby that there is no Wi-Fi due to the snowstorm. Sian knocks on her window and apologizes. So with her help, they both go and examine Rohan's body. After telling Sian about the nightly event with the signaling lights, they both head toward the location to find out who was responding with the white light. The pair encounter a snowstorm and rush back to the hotel in a car only to tumble off the side of a hill. While passed out, Darby recalls memories of Bill that indicate he is Zoomer's biological father.
5	"Chapter 5: Crypt"	Brit Marling	Brit Marling	December 5, 2023
Darby goes underground to find Andy, discovering him in an ornate lower-level bunker. The two begin to discuss the events that have transpired, questioning other guests. Eventually, Darby visits Lee in Zoomer's room and discovers Lee has a get-away bag. After she's caught, Darby heads upstairs where she is assaulted by a masked figure in her room who tells her to stop investigating the murders. Additionally, she witnesses Sian dying while being hooked to medical devices. Darby heads outside to find the remaining guests sitting around a campfire. They mourn the passing of the other guests together. Back in her room, Darby gets a Morse code message to go to the pool. She heads to the pool and submerges only to be swiftly trapped by a glass pool cover. In a series of flashbacks throughout the episode, Darby and Bill travel to a second hotel. Darby is hyper-fixated on solving the murders while Bill deals with the emotional gravity of the situation. At the hotel, Darby wakes Bill up to say she found the killer's address. She says they should go, but Bill is apprehensive.
6	"Chapter 6: Crime Seen"	Brit Marling	Brit Marling & Zal Batmanglij	December 12, 2023
A figure breaks the pool cover and lifts Darby out. As she comes to, Darby realizes she is with Lee and David. Lee confides in Darby again, revealing that Andy is physically abusive. She concocted a plan to take Zoomer to Canada utilizing a disguise. After reaching Canada, she pulled into the driveway of her friend's house to find Andy already waiting. Oliver shows up, saying David sent him. The three go to Bill's room to look for any remaining clues. They find that Bill marked specific pages in Darby's book The Silver Doe with his blood. Darby begins to read the pages. During a flashback, it is revealed that the mysterious figure who appeared at the top of the steps in the serial killer's house was in fact the killer, who shot himself on the spot. Back at the hotel, Darby and Bill comfort each other, but Darby begins to discuss the case again, much to Bill's chagrin. Darby wakes up the next morning to find Bill gone with his electronics submerged in the tub. Back in the present, Lee comforts a weeping Darby until they hear a knock at the door. They open the door to find Todd holding a bloodied David right before Andy appears.
7	"Chapter 7: Retreat"	Zal Batmanglij	Brit Marling & Zal Batmanglij	December 19, 2023
Back in Andy's bunker, all remaining guests gather and discuss what has occurred. During the discussion, Darby realizes who killed Bill and Rohan: Zoomer through the instruction of Ray. Zoomer, utilizing his AR video game helmet, was instructed by Ray to complete certain tasks that resulted in the murder of Bill and Rohan. Ray was motivated to kill Bill and Rohan due to therapy sessions with Andy, where Andy, in anger, identified Bill as a threat to everything he'd built. Andy refuses to take responsibility and attacks Darby but is then knocked out by Lee. Lee, Darby, and Zoomer head to Ray's server room, setting it on fire and effectively killing Ray. Lee and Zoomer escape the hotel before the authorities arrive. In a reading of her sophomore book Retreat, Darby theorizes that Lee and Zoomer reached Rohan's boat and safely escaped.

== Release ==
In the United States, the seven-episode miniseries premiered on November 14, 2023, on FX on Hulu, with the first two episodes available immediately and the rest debuting on a weekly basis. It was originally set to debut on August 29, 2023, but was delayed due to the 2023 SAG-AFTRA strike. Internationally, the series premiered on Disney+, while in Latin America it premiered on Star+.

=== Promotion ===
To promote the series, FX Networks launched a months-long puzzle utilizing websites, physical tools, and Instagram. The puzzle started when FX hosted an event at The Mysterious Bookshop where fans were given pages to decode. These pages lead to the reveal of the first promo image for the show. The puzzle continued later with rings given out to those who attended the A Murder At The End Of The World booth at San Diego Comic-Con. Through Near Field Communication (NFC) capabilities, the rings lead to an online webpage that revealed a trailer for the show.

== Reception ==
=== Audience viewership ===
According to ReelGood, which tracks real-time data from 5 million users in the United States across subscription and advertisement-based video on demand services for streaming programs and movies, A Murder at the End of the World became the most watched content during the week of November 23. Meanwhile, JustWatch reported that the series became the second most streamed TV show in the United States during the weeks of November 19 and 26.

According to data from Television Stats, the series has topped the Hulu's Top TV Shows chart on November 14, 2023, where it has remained in the position as of November 27, 2023.

=== Critical response ===
The review aggregator website Rotten Tomatoes reports a approval rating of 88%, with an average rating of 6.9/10, based on 59 reviews. The critics consensus reads, "Confounding as it is seductive, Murder at the End of the World is a worthy brain-teaser for fans of Brit Marling and Zal Batmanglij's offbeat storytelling." Metacritic, which uses a weighted average, assigned the show a score of 73 out of 100 based on 32 critics, indicating "generally favorable reviews".

A Murder at the End of the World was named among the best TV shows of 2023 by Variety, Elle, Rolling Stone, LA Times, Boston Globe, The New York Post, The New Republic, The Wrap, Collider, The Ringer and Vulture.

=== Fan response ===
In order to discuss the puzzles released by FX Networks, fans created a Discord Server called ''Angel Neurosis.'' This discord server grew from 30 members to 1,000 members over the course of the show's airing. Angel Neurosis hosted weekly watch parties as the show premiered. Cast and crew, including Zal Batmanglij, Brit Marling (Lee), Javed Kahn (Rohan), Edoardo Ballerini (Ray), Daniel Olson (Tomas), and Alex DiGerlando have attended these watch parties and participated in live chats with Angel Neurosis members.

=== Accolades ===
Year	Award	Category	Nominee(s)	Result	Ref.
2024	Art Direction Guild Awards	Excellence in Production Design for a Television Movie or Limited Series	Alex DiGerlando	Nominated	
2024	BAFTA Television Awards	Best Supporting Actor	Harris Dickinson	Nominated	
2024	Critics' Choice Awards	Best Limited Series	A Murder at the End of the World	Nominated	
2024	Independent Spirit Awards	Best Lead Performance in a New Scripted Series	Emma Corrin	Nominated	
2024	Visual Effects Society Awards	Outstanding Supporting Visual Effects in a Photoreal Episode	Aaron Raff, Tavis Larkham, Douglas Stichbury, Mat Ellin (for "Crypt")	Nominated	
2024	Writers Guild of America Awards	Limited Series	Zal Batmanglij, Cherie Dimaline, Brit Marling, Melanie Marnich, Rebecca Roanhorse	Nominated	
