= Star Wars: Resistance Reborn =

Novel by Rebecca Roanhorse

- Author: Rebecca Roanhorse
- Language: English
- Series: Journey to Star Wars: The Rise of Skywalker
- Genre: Science fiction
- Publisher: Del Rey Books
- Publication date: November 5, 2019
- Publication place: United States
- Media type: Print (Hardcover)
- Pages: 368 (First edition, hardcover)
- ISBN: 978-0593128428 (First edition, hardcover)

Star Wars: Resistance Reborn is a Star Wars novel by Rebecca Roanhorse, published by Del Rey Books on November 5, 2019. Set between the events of the 2017 film Star Wars: The Last Jedi and the 2019 film Star Wars: The Rise of Skywalker, the story follows the exploits of General Leia Organa, Poe Dameron, Rey, and Finn as they try to rebuild the Resistance following the destruction of Starkiller Base, their devastating escape from D'Qar, the defeat to the First Order at the Battle of Crait, and the deaths of Luke Skywalker and Han Solo.

The novel was announced in May 2019 as part of the Journey to Star Wars: The Rise of Skywalker publishing program.

== Plot ==
After the defeat and narrow escape at Crait, the Resistance's numbers are decimated. Poe Dameron and members of Black Squadron and Inferno Squadron are tasked with searching for allies, while Leia Organa and the remaining Resistance members, including Chewbacca, Finn and Rey are aboard the Millennium Falcon, avoiding the First Order and searching for a safe place to hide and regroup. Meanwhile, the First Order has expanded its influence and occupied several worlds, including Corellia.

Dameron and the other members of Black Squadron defeat a small First Order force on the planet Ikkrukk but do not gain it as an ally in the Resistance. Dameron meets with Maz Kanata on the planet Ephemera, but she also declines to join the Resistance. Dameron and Black Squadron find that potential allies across the galaxy have disappeared, often suddenly without explanation. Snap Wexley and his mate Karé Kun reach Akiva where they visit the farm of Wedge Antilles and Norra Wexley, hoping to get them to join the Resistance. Initially doubtful, and hoping to avoid the fight, Wedge and Norra are forced to flee when their home is attacked by First Order sympathizers.

Meanwhile, on Corellia, the planet's shipyards have been turned over to the production of new ships for the First Order, using slaves, droids and political prisoners. Winshur Bratt, the executive records officer of the shipyards, is tasked by the First Order with accepting 15 political prisoners and hiding them within the shipyard workers' population. Bratt also receives secret documents including a secret document of the First Order's list of opponents or potential Resistance sympathizers it intends to neutralize. Bratt assigns all 15 to lowly shipyard duties.

The Falcon arrives on the planet Ryloth, where Leia calls on former Rebel allies, who take them in secretly. Yendor, the head of the Ryloth Defence Authority, agrees to hide the Resistance on Ryloth temporarily, allowing the Resistance to regroup. Black Squadron and the Antilles' arrive on Ryloth, while at the same time a group of First Order representatives arrive on Ryloth. The First Order is demanding that Ryloth pay a tithe to the First Order or have the local space shipping lanes around Ryloth be blockaded by the First Order.

Bratt's assistant Monti Calay steals the First Order list and passes it on to the Collective, who make it available via a secret auction to be held on Corellia. The Resistance gets an invitation to the auction through Maz Kanata and sends Dameron and Finn to bid on the list, while Antilles and a team try to liberate some of the prisoners from Corellia. Dameron bids on the list at the auction but is rapidly outbid. The First Order raids the auction, causing a firefight. Dameron and Finn escape with the auction holder Nifera Shu who promises to give over the list in exchange for passage and all of Dameron's credits. Meanwhile, the Antilles group is successful in liberating a group of prisoners, including Ransolm Casterfo. They steal a blockade runner ship and evacuate with Dameron's team and some of the liberated prisoners. Bratt is killed in the breakout.

Realizing the Resistance has too few ships to operate, a group led by Shriv Suurgav and Zay Versio, calling themselves Dross Squadron, goes to the junkyard planet Bracca to try and steal some ships before they are scrapped. The team is drawn into a fight with a First Order guard unit while trying to save some ships from the junkyard's digester. They manage to escape with several ships.

Back on Ryloth, the Resistance hideout is attacked by First Order forces. Yendor's daughter Hahnee is killed. The Resistance forces manage to escape with the help of Yendor. They fly off to a secret location on another planet at coordinates provided by Nifera Shu. Yendor chooses to join the group. All teams manage to reunite at the new temporary location, where they develop plans to expand the Resistance with more allies.

== Publication ==
With the 2012 acquisition of Lucasfilm by The Walt Disney Company, most of the licensed Star Wars novels and comics produced since the originating 1977 film Star Wars were rebranded as Star Wars Legends and declared non-canon to the franchise in April 2014. A new series of novels, aligned with the continuity of the films and the canon TV series The Clone Wars and Star Wars Rebels, began publication in September 2014.

A publishing initiative called Journey to Star Wars: The Force Awakens was announced in 2015 in the run-up to the release of Star Wars: The Force Awakens that would feature non-film materials considered canon to help fill in the story leading into the film. A similar initiative was released in 2017 ahead of Star Wars: The Last Jedi. On May 4, 2019, Lucasfilm announced the publishing program to bridge the story between The Last Jedi and The Rise of Skywalker, with Resistance Reborn announced as the key adult novel in the initiative.

== Reception ==
Den of Geek gave a positive review: "Even if the details don’t always work, the story is well-constructed and eventually comes together." Reactor described the pace of the plot as stilted at the beginning but said the author "did her best with an incredibly tight outline".
