= Otto Penzler =

American editor

- Born: July 8, 1942 (age 84); Germany
- Occupations: Bookseller, writer, publisher
- Employer(s): The Mysterious Bookshop, Penzler Publishers
- Writing career
- Language: English
- Genre: Mystery fiction

Otto Penzler (born July 8, 1942) is an American editor of mystery fiction, and proprietor of The Mysterious Bookshop in New York City.

== Biography ==
Born in Germany to a German-American mother and a German father, Penzler moved to The Bronx at age five after the death of his father. Penzler graduated from the University of Michigan, having studied English literature.

He is the co-author of the Encyclopedia of Mystery and Detection for which he won an Edgar Award in 1977. He also wrote 101 Greatest Movies of Mystery and Suspense (2000). For The New York Sun, he wrote The Crime Scene, a popular weekly mystery fiction column that ran for five years. He has worked with authors including Elmore Leonard, Nelson DeMille, Joyce Carol Oates, Sue Grafton, Mary Higgins Clark, Stanley Ellin, Robert Crais, Michael Connelly, James Lee Burke and Thomas H. Cook.

He founded The Mysterious Press, a publishing house devoted entirely to mystery and crime fiction, in 1975. Among the authors it published (works published in America for the first time, not reprints) are Eric Ambler, Kingsley Amis, Isaac Asimov, Robert Bloch, James M. Cain, Raymond Chandler, Jerome Charyn, Len Deighton, Stanley Ellin, James Ellroy, Patricia Highsmith, P. D. James, H. R. F. Keating, Peter Lovesey, Ed McBain, Ross Macdonald, Marcia Muller, Ellis Peters, Ruth Rendell, Mickey Spillane, Ross Thomas, Donald E. Westlake and Cornell Woolrich. In the 1980s it was publishing more than 100 books a year and the imprint was affiliated with major publishers in England (Century-Hutchinson-Arrow), Japan (Hayakwa Publishing), Italy (Mondadori) and Sweden (Bra Bocker). The Mysterious Book Club became a division of the Book of the Month Club and Mysterious Audios an imprint with Dove Audio.

After selling The Mysterious Press to Warner Books in 1989, he created an Otto Penzler Books imprint for Macmillan (later Scribner). He moved the imprint to Carroll & Graf, then to Harcourt (later Houghton Mifflin Harcourt). He also established the Otto Penzler Books imprint in London, first with Quercus, then with Atlantic/Corvus, now with Head of Zeus. He reacquired The Mysterious Press name from Hachette in 2009; it was an imprint at Grove Atlantic until 2021, when it became an independent imprint as part of Penzler Publishers.

In 2011, he founded MysteriousPress.com, a publishing house devoted to electronic books featuring such authors as James Ellroy, Donald E. Westlake, Ellery Queen, Joseph Wambaugh, Ross Macdonald, Charlotte MacLeod and many others.

Penzler founded The Mysterious Bookshop in mid-town Manhattan and after twenty-seven years moved to Tribeca. It is now the oldest and largest mystery specialist bookstore in the world.

In 2002, he hosted a television series of great mystery films for the Turner Classic Movies channel.

He has edited more than fifty anthologies of crime fiction of both reprints and newly commissioned stories, including the prestigious Best American Mystery Stories—now Best Mystery Stories of the Year—since 1997.

Penzler served on the board of directors of the Mystery Writers of America for fourteen years and was awarded the organization's Ellery Queen Award and a Raven (its highest non-writing award). He won a second Edgar for editing The Lineup, a collection of profiles of famous detectives, written by their creators.

On April 8, 2010 Swann Galleries auctioned The Otto Penzler Collection of British Espionage and Thriller Fiction. The sale represented a select portion of Penzler's private library with works by Eric Ambler, Ian Fleming, Graham Greene, John le Carré, William Le Queux, H. C. McNeile, E. Phillips Oppenheim, and Dennis Wheatley. Penzler also befriended many noted authors including Ambler, Ken Follett, John Gardner and others, who inscribed copies of their works. "British spy novels are among the greatest of all works in the mystery genre", Penzler said in the introduction to the Swann auction catalogue. "This is the first auction ever devoted entirely to this important literary genre."

In Fall 2018, Penzler established Penzler Publishers, which launched American Mystery Classics, a collection of newly reissued mystery and detective fiction, many of which had been unavailable for several decades. Some of the American Mystery Classics authors include Mary Roberts Rinehart, John Dickson Carr, and Ellery Queen, all distributed by WW Norton.

In 2019, Penzler teamed up with Pegasus Books to launch Scarlet, a joint publishing venture specializing in psychological suspense aimed at female readers. Scarlet became an independent imprint as part of Penzler Publishers in 2020. The first title, An Inconvenient Woman, the debut from author Stephanie Buelens, was released January 2020, distributed by W.W. Norton.

Penzler lives in New York City and Connecticut.

== Works ==
=== Publisher ===
- Otto Penzler Books. An imprint at Houghton Mifflin Harcourt (2005–2010).
- The Armchair Detective Library. Reprinted classic crime fiction for collectors and libraries.
- The Mysterious Press. Established in 1975. Sold to Time/Warner in 1989; reacquired by Penzler in 2009; an imprint at Grove/Atlantic until 2021; now an imprint of Penzler Publishers.
- The Armchair Detective. A quarterly journal for studies of mystery and suspense fiction (17 years).
- MysteriousPress.com. An eBook company distributed by Open Road Integrated Media.
- Penzler Publishers. A publishing company that releases newly reissued mystery classics, distributed by WW Norton.
- Scarlet. An imprint of Penzler Publishers specializing in psychological suspense aimed at female readers.

=== Series editor ===
- The Best American Mystery Stories. Annual series from 1997 to 2021, with guest editors. Writer Robert B. Parker wrote "Otto Penzler knows more about crime fiction than most people know about anything, and proves it once more in this brilliant anthology."
- The Best American Crime Writing. Annual series since 2002, with Thomas H. Cook and guest editors.
- The Mysterious Bookshop Presents: The Best Mystery Stories of the Year. Annual series since 2021, with guest editors.

=== Editor ===
- The Crown Crime Companion : The Top 100 Mystery Novels of All Time Edited with Mickey Friedman. (1995)
- Murder For Love (1996)
- The 50 Greatest Mysteries of All Time (1998)
- Murder For Revenge (1998)
- Murder and Obsession (1999)
- Best American Mystery Stories of the Century Edited with Tony Hillerman. (2000)
- Murderer's Row (2001)
- Murder On the Ropes (2001)
- Dangerous Women (2005)
- Murder is My Racquet (2005)
- Murder in the Rough (2006)
- Murder at the Racetrack (2006)
- Murder at the Foul Line (2006)
- The Black Lizard Big Book of Pulps (2007)
- Dead Man's Hand: Crime Fiction at the Poker Table (2007)
- The Vicious Circle: Mystery and Crime Stories by Members of the Algonquin Round Table (2007)
- The Lineup: The World's Greatest Crime Writers Tell the Inside Story of Their Greatest Detectives (2009)
- The Vampire Archive (2009)
- Black Noir: Mystery, Crime, and Suspense Stories by African-American Writers (2009)
- Christmas at the Mysterious Bookshop (2010)
- The Greatest Russian Stories of Crime and Suspense (2010)
- The Best American Noir of the Century (2010)
- The Black Lizard Big Book of Black Mask Stories (2010)
- Agents of Treachery (2010)
- The Big Book of Adventure Stories (2011)
- Zombies! Zombies! Zombies! (2011) ISBN 978-0-307-74089-2
- The Big Book of Ghost Stories (2012)
- Kwik Krimes (2013)
- The Big Book of Christmas Mysteries (2013)
- The Black Lizard Big Book of Locked-Room Mysteries (2014)
- The Best American Mystery Stories of the Nineteenth Century (2014)
- The Big Book of Sherlock Holmes Stories (2015)
- The Big Book of Jack the Ripper (2016)
- Silent Night, Deadly Night (2016)
- The Big Book of Rogues and Villains (2017)
- The Big Book of Female Detectives (2018)
- The Big Book of Reel Murders (2019)
- The Big Book of Espionage Stories (2020)
- Golden Age Detective Stories (2021)
- The Big Book of Victorian Mysteries (2021)
- Golden Age Locked Room Mysteries (2022)

== Guest appearances ==
- Author Lawrence Block wrote a Christmas story, "The Burglar Who Smelled Smoke", set in The Mysterious Bookshop, where Otto Penzler appeared in character.
- Author Elmore Leonard's novel, Up In Honey's Room, features an escaped World War II German soldier, a Waffen SS major named Otto Penzler.
- Author Donald E. Westlake's character John Dortmunder evades police pursuit by crashing a poker game in the short story Give Till it Hurts. The game's host is Otto (no last name) who lives above a bookstore; the other players are an agent, an editor, and two mystery authors.

== Awards ==
- 2018. The Killer Nashville 2018 John Seigenthaler Legends Award.
- 2015. Lifetime Achievement Award from the Strand Magazine.
- 2012. The Jay and Deen Kogan Award for Excellence at NoirCon.
- 2010. Edgar Award from Mystery Writers of America. For The Lineup. Best Biographical/Critical Work
- 2003. Raven Award from Mystery Writers of America. As owner of Mysterious Bookshop.
- 1994. Ellery Queen Award from Mystery Writers of America. Contributions to mystery publishing.
- 1977. Edgar Award from Mystery Writers of America. For The Encyclopedia of Mystery and Detection. Best Critical/Biographical Work.
