= Rebecca Roanhorse =

American speculative fiction author (born 1971)

- Roanhorse at the 2026 Rose City Comic Con
- Born: Rebecca Parish; September 23, 1971 (age 55); Conway, Arkansas
- Citizenship: American
- Education: Yale University (BA); Union Theological Seminary (MA); University of New Mexico School of Law (JD)
- Occupations: novelist lawyer science fiction writer
- Spouse: Michael Roanhorse
- Awards: John W. Campbell Award for Best New Writer, 2018; Hugo Award for Best Short Story, 2018; Nebula Award for Best Short Story, 2017
- Website: rebeccaroanhorse.com

Rebecca Roanhorse (née Parish; born 23 September 1971) is an American science fiction and fantasy writer from New Mexico.

She has written short stories and science fiction novels featuring Navajo and other indigenous American characters. A Hugo and Nebula award winner, she has been lauded for expansion and modernization of Indigenous myth. Her enrollment status with tribal nations has been the subject of media scrutiny. Her best known works include Trail of Lightning and Black Sun.

== Early life and education ==
Roanhorse was born in Conway, Arkansas, in 1971. She has said that she is of Ohkay Owingeh Pueblo descent through her mother's family, and African American on her father's side. She was adopted as a child by white parents and raised in northern Texas. Roanhorse has described "being a black and Native kid in Fort Worth in the '70s and '80s" as "pretty limiting." She turned to reading and writing, especially science fiction, as a form of escape. Her father was an economics professor, and her mother was a high school English teacher who encouraged Rebecca's early attempts at writing stories.

=== Indigenous identity ===
In a 2020 profile by Vulture, Roanhorse stated at seven years old she learned of her ancestry from looking at her birth certificate. While living and working in New York City, she hired a private investigator to track down her birth mother. The resulting reunion was uncomfortable, as her birth and adoption had been a secret. According to the Vulture profile, "Her birth father, a minister, had never learned of her existence. Neither had most of her mother’s extended family—conservative Pueblo Catholics from New Mexico. One of her aunts, a former nun, later told her, 'It would be better if you went away.'"

Roanhorse graduated from Yale University and earned a master’s degree in theology at Union Theological Seminary. She worked briefly as a computer programmer on Wall Street. Later, after meeting her birth mother, she earned her JD degree from the University of New Mexico School of Law, specializing in Federal Indian Law and lived for several years on the Navajo Nation. She clerked at the Navajo Supreme Court before working as an attorney.

==== Dispute of identity ====
After Roanhorse began publishing and public speaking, her enrollment in the community was questioned. Leaders of the Ohkay Owingeh community have stated that Roanhorse is not enrolled there and has no connection to their community.

Dr. Matthew Martinez, former Lieutenant Governor of Ohkay Owingeh, welcomed Roanhorse on her first and only visit to the community, in 2018, and spent time with her. He said, "I recognize that adoption is an emotional experience for families and communities and especially those who have been adopted out with no real connection to home....At Ohkay Owingeh, our current enrollment process privileges family lineage and not blood quantum." Agoyo explained that "anyone who descends from an Ohkay family—as Roanhorse has publicly claimed—can become a citizen. But Martinez said the author has chosen a different path." Martinez continued, "by not engaging in any form of cultural and community acknowledgement, Roanhorse has failed to establish any legitimate claim to call herself Ohkay Owingeh." He eventually concluded, "It is unethical for Roanhorse to be claiming Ohkay Owingeh and using this identity to publish Native stories."

However, in an essay in the Los Angeles Review of Books, Adrian L. Jawort disputed the idea that Roanhorse's couldn't claim her Native identity. Jawort, a Northern Cheyenne journalist and fiction writer, said that "Several Native writers and academics have told me in confidence that they feel accusations of appropriation against Roanhorse are unwarranted." And Kayla Shaggy, a Diné and Anishinaabe Two-Spirit artist, attributed the backlash over Roanhorse's Native identity to "intense anti-Black racism in Indian Country."

== Career ==
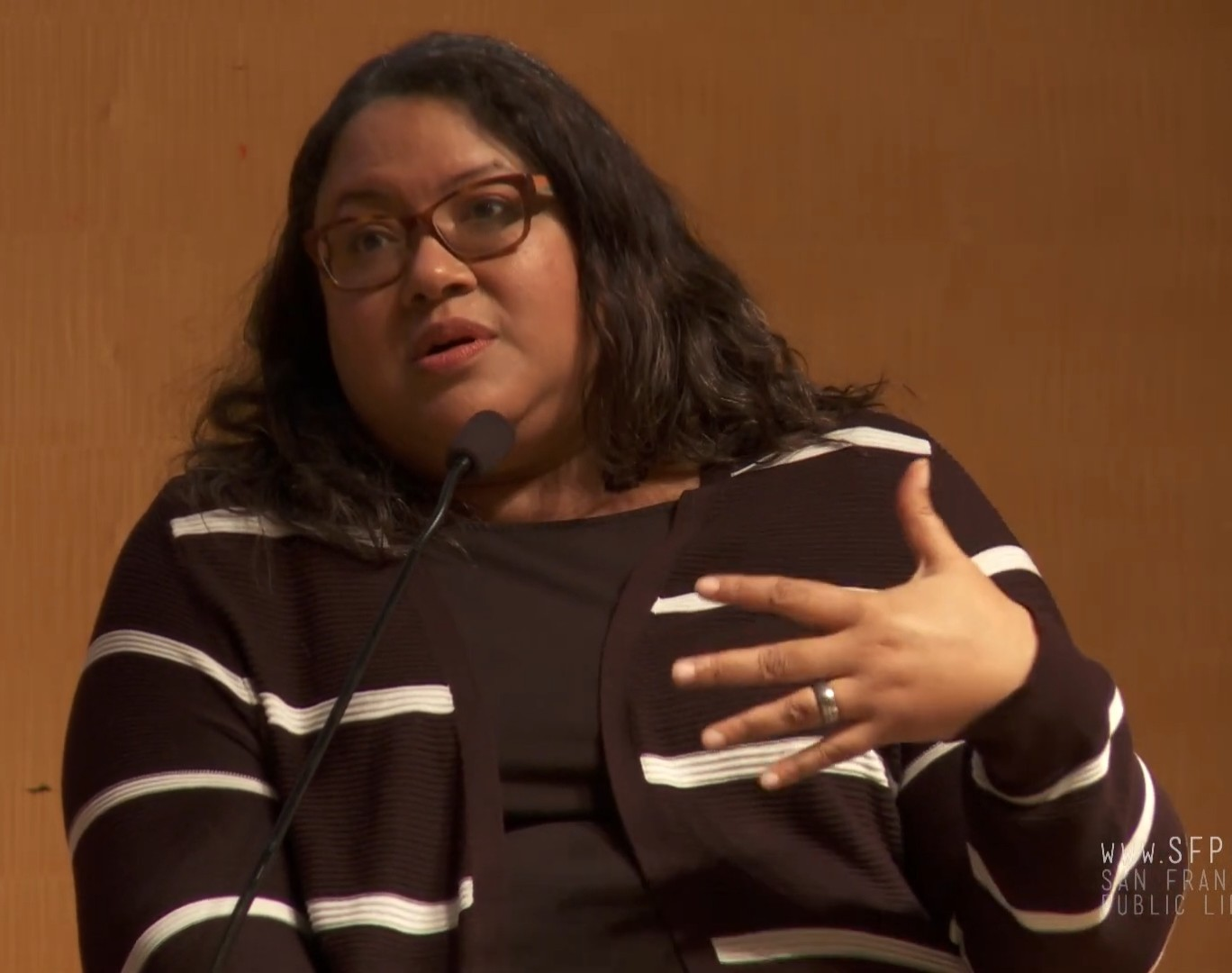
Rebecca Roanhorse in 2019

Roanhorse had tried to write fantasy stories since her childhood and, as she told The New York Times, initially worked on "Tolkien knockoffs about white farm boys going on journeys", because she figured that is what readers wanted.

In August 2017, Roanhorse's short story "Welcome to Your Authentic Indian Experience™" was published in Apex Magazine. Her first novel Trail of Lightning was published on June 26, 2018, with a sequel, titled Storm of Locusts, published the year after. The series is an urban fantasy story set in Dinétah, formerly the Navajo reservation in the Southwestern United States, starring a Navajo character fighting in a post-apocalyptic world inhabited by Native American gods and monsters. Roanhorse also wrote the Between Earth and Sky series, beginning with Black Sun released in October 2020, and followed by Fevered Star (2022) and Mirrored Heavens (2024). The series is set in an secondary fantasy world inspired by various pre-Columbian American cultures.

In March 2020, it was announced that "Welcome to Your Authentic Indian Experience™" was optioned by Amazon Studios for a potential film adaption. In December 2021, the rights for Black Sun were auctioned by AMC Studios to be adapted as a television series.

Roanhorse also wrote the Star Wars novel Resistance Reborn, published in November 2019, which is bridging the gap between the films Star Wars: Episode VIII – The Last Jedi and Episode IX – The Rise of Skywalker. Her second Star Wars novel Reign of the Empire: Edge of Abyss is set to be published in fall 2026. The second installment in the Reign of the Empire trilogy, it serves as a prequel of the television series Andor.

On August 19, 2020, Roanhorse was announced as a contributing writer to Marvel Comics' Marvel's Voices: Indigenous Voices #1 anthology, which was released in November 2020. She wrote a story about Echo, joined by Weshoyot Alvitre on art.

Roanhorse was also a writer on the first season of the 2023 television miniseries A Murder at the End of the World and the 2024 Marvel Cinematic Universe miniseries Echo.

== Themes and reception ==
In 2018 Roanhorse received the John W. Campbell Award for Best New Writer. Her short story "Welcome to Your Authentic Indian Experience™" won two major awards: the 2018 Hugo Award for Best Short Story and the 2017 Nebula Award for Best Short Story. The story also earned her nominations for the 2018 Locus Award for Best Short Story, the 2018 Theodore Sturgeon Award, and the 2018 World Fantasy Award for Best Short Fiction.

=== Trail of Lightning and Indigenous representation ===
Her first novel, Trail of Lightning, received significant critical acclaim. Kirkus Reviews described the book as a "sharp, wonderfully dreamy, action-driven novel," while The Verge praised the book's representation of Native cultures, saying it "takes readers along for a fun ride." It went on to win the 2019 Locus Award for Best First Novel, and was a finalist for the 2018 Nebula Award for Best Novel, 2019 Hugo Award for Best Novel, and 2019 World Fantasy Award for Best Novel.

However, it has been criticized by Navajo/Diné and other Native authors, scholars, and activists, who have argued that, due to a lack of cultural connection, it misrepresents Navajo teachings and spirituality, disrespects Navajo sensibilities, and harms Navajo culture. A group of Navajo writers and cultural workers condemned Trail of Lightning as an inaccurate cultural appropriation that uses an at-times mocking and derisive tone. For example, the Saad Bee Hózhǫ́ writers' collective criticized the hero's use of bullets filled with corn pollen to slay the monster, which they viewed as a violent, disrespectful misuse of sacred ceremonial traditions.

When asked in a Reddit AMA about including Navajo cultural aspects into her works, Roanhorse said her goal was "accuracy and respect" and gave examples of what she fictionalized and what she considered off-limits. "I think a lot of Native characters that we see are stuck in the past. So it was important for me to...show Native American readers and non-Native American readers that we're alive and we're thriving in our cultures", she said in 2018. In addition, Roanhorse sought Navajo views and input during the writing of Trail of Lightning, including PhD student Charlie Scott. "Scott and a number of Native writers I spoke with pointed out that the critique of Roanhorse comes primarily from Native academics, many of whom came through Ivy League institutions or MFA programs and share a particular view of what Native literature should be. For Native readers who like Roanhorse’s work, her willingness to deviate from tradition is exactly what makes her books so exciting and important."

Prominent Native scholar Debbie Reese (Nambé Pueblo) was one of the pre-publication Native reviewers Roanhorse asked to review the book for accurate representation. Reese praised Trail of Lightning, writing in her Barnes and Noble review that "Roanhorse lifts Indigenous readers, giving us a brilliant mirror that made my Indigenous heart soar." But after hearing from the Saad Bee Hózhǫ́, a collective of Diné writers made up mostly of poets and academics, she changed her mind about the book, writing that she'd "come to understand that Roanhorse had crossed the Diné's 'lines of disclosure,' an offense that many white interlopers had committed in the past." She retracted the review and criticized Roanhorse for sharing sacred cultural practices and narratives that were not meant to be taken outside the culture, as well as misusing and misrepresenting sacred stories. Critics of Roanhorse argue that because the Indigenous community that Roanhorse has claimed does not claim her, or her mother that she claims was from the community, this makes her non-Indigenous. Her defenders do not question her claims of Indigenous heritage and have expressed concern that questions about her identity are either racist, due to Roanhorse having a Black father, or a distraction from discussions of her work's content. Others have discussed anti-Blackness within Indigenous communities and how this may impact critiques of Roanhorse.

At some point in 2018, when the complaints of cultural appropriation surfaced, references to the Ohkay Owingeh were removed from her official website; Roanhorse has stated that she believes her mother's family descended from Ohkay Owingeh people but is "trying to be more careful" about how she discusses it.

=== Between Earth and Sky ===
In their Locus review of Black Sun, Alex Brown calls the book "a brilliant work of art", and lauds the characters, the worldbuilding, the magic system, and the way queerness is normalized and gender hierarchies absent in the world of the novel. Kirkus Reviews praised the characterization and political intrigue, calling it "the next big thing". Grimdark Magazine said Black Sun was "nearly impossible to put down", and praised the skilled combination of action and character-driven plot.

Fevered Star received a positive review from Kirkus Reviews, which called it "an excellent second installment". It received a starred review from Library Journal, which called the novel "amazingly complex". Writing for Tor.com, Angela Maria Spring gave the second book a moderately positive review. She praised the complex plot and felt that Naranpa's character arc was the strongest of all of the characters, but felt that the pacing was slow and that the novel suffered from Serapio's separation from Xiala.

Alex Brown's Locus review of Mirrored Heavens pointed out the high expectations the first two books created for the final installment of the trilogy, and reassured that they were "not disappointed" by the "high drama and shocking moments" delivered. Brown writes, "Roanhorse has built a vast, intricate world unlike anything else out there. The trappings are familiar—young people resisting fate, gods enacting ancient feuds with human avatars, power-hungry madmen—but the execution is decidedly unique." Kirkus Reviews asserts that "Roanhorse’s fans won’t be surprised to hear that she’s crafted a complex, suspenseful, and ultimately satisfying ending to her masterful trilogy." Publishers Weekly called Roanhorse "in top form" and the conclusion to the series "satisfying".

== Personal life ==
Roanhorse currently lives in New Mexico with her husband Michael Roanhorse, who is Navajo, and their daughter. Michael is a jewelry artist.

== Filmography ==
=== Television ===
Year	Title	Season	Episode number	Episode title	Notes
2023	A Murder at the End of the World	1	2	"Chapter 2: The Silver Doe"	Co-written with Brit Marling & Zal Batmanglij and Melanie Marnich
2024	Echo	1	2	"Lowak"	Story; co-written with Marion Dayre & Ken Kristensen and Josh Feldman & Steven Paul Judd and Bobby Wilson

== Bibliography ==
=== Novels ===
- Star Wars: Resistance Reborn (November 5, 2019)
- Race to the Sun (January 14, 2020)
- Star Wars: Reign of the Empire: Edge of Abyss (Fall 2026)

==== The Sixth World ====
- Trail of Lightning (June 26, 2018)
- Storm of Locusts (April 23, 2019)

==== Between Earth and Sky ====
- Black Sun (October 13, 2020)
- Fevered Star (April 19, 2022)
- Mirrored Heavens (June 4, 2024)

=== Novellas ===
- Tread of Angels ( November 15, 2022)

=== Short stories and essays ===
- "Native in Space" in Invisible 3: Essays and Poems on Representation in SF/F, edited by Jim Hines and Mary Anne Mohanraj (June 27, 2017)
- "Welcome to Your Authentic Indian Experience™" in Apex Magazine (August 8, 2017)
- "Postcards from the Apocalypse" in Uncanny Magazine (January/February 2018)
- "Thoughts on Resistance" in How I Resist: Activism and Hope for a New Generation, edited by Maureen Johnson (2018)
- "Harvest" originally published in New Suns: Original Speculative Fiction by People of Color, edited by Nisi Shawl (March 12, 2019) and reprinted in Uncanny Magazine (2019)
- "The Missing Ingredient" in Hungry Hearts: 13 Tales of Food & Love, edited by Caroline Tung Richmond and Elsie Chapman (July 7, 2019)
- "A Brief Lesson in Native American Astronomy" originally published in The Mythic Dream (September 3, 2019) and reprinted in Apex Magazine (October 2, 2021) and The Best American Science Fiction and Fantasy 2020, edited by Diana Gabaldon and John Joseph Adams (October 6, 2020)
- "Dark Vengeance" in Star Wars: The Clone Wars: Stories of Light and Dark (August 25, 2020)
- "The Boys from Blood River" in Vampires Never Get Old: Tales with Fresh Bite, edited by Zoraida Córdova and Natalie C. Parker (September 22, 2020)
- "Takeback Tango" in A Universe of Wishes: A We Need Diverse Books Anthology, edited by Dhonielle Clayton (December 8, 2020)
- "Rez Dog Rules" in Ancestor Approved: Intertribal Stories for Kids, edited by Cynthia L. Smith (February 9, 2021)
- "Wherein Abigail Fields Recalls Her First Death and, Subsequently Her Best Life" in A Phoenix First Must Burn: Sixteen Stories of Black Girl Magic, Resistance, and Hope, edited by Patrice Caldwell (March 10, 2021)
- "The Demon Drum" in The Cursed Carnival and Other Calamities: New Stories About Mythic Heroes, edited by Rick Riordan (September 28, 2021)
- "White Hills" in Never Whistle At Night: An Indigenous Dark Fiction Anthology (September, 19th, 2023)
- "Eye & Tooth" in Out There Screaming: An Anthology of New Black Horror, edited by Jordan Peele (October 3, 2023)

=== Comics ===
==== Native Realities ====
- Deer Woman: An Anthology (December 1, 2017)

==== Marvel Comics ====
- Marvel's Voices
  - "Echo: Hitting Back" in Marvel's Voices: Indigenous Voices (November 18, 2020)
  - "River: A Friend in Need" in Marvel's Voices: Heritage (January 12, 2022)
- Phoenix Song: Echo #1–5 (October 20, 2021 – February 23, 2022)
- "Werewolf By Moon Knight" in Crypt of Shadows vol. 3 #1 (October 19, 2022)
- "What A Girl Wants" in Women of Marvel vol. 4 #1 (March 22, 2023)
- Chee'ilth #1 (October 13, 2023)
- Predator: Black, White & Blood #1 (August 27, 2025)

=== Anthology appearances ===
- Diana Gabaldon; John Joseph Adams, eds. (2020). "A Brief Lesson in Native American Astronomy". The Best American Science Fiction and Fantasy 2020. Mariner Books. ISBN 9781328613103.
- Hugh Howey; John Joseph Adams, eds. (2024). "Eye & Tooth". The Best American Science Fiction and Fantasy 2024. Mariner Books. ISBN 9780063315785.

=== Anthology as editor ===
- The Best American Science Fiction and Fantasy 2022. Mariner Books. 2022. ISBN 9780358690122.

== Awards and nominations ==
Awards for Rebecca Roanhorse
Year	Work	Award	Category	Result	Ref.
2017	"Welcome to Your Authentic Indian Experience™"	Nebula Award	Short Story	Won	
2018	Trail of Lightning	Nebula Award	Novel	Nominated	
2018	"Welcome to Your Authentic Indian Experience™"	Astounding Award for Best New Writer	—	Won	
2018	"Welcome to Your Authentic Indian Experience™"	Hugo Award	Short Story	Won	
2018	"Welcome to Your Authentic Indian Experience™"	Locus Award	Short Story	Finalist	
2018	"Welcome to Your Authentic Indian Experience™"	Theodore Sturgeon Award	—	Finalist	
2018	"Welcome to Your Authentic Indian Experience™"	World Fantasy Award	Short Fiction	Nominated	
2019	Storm of Locusts	Audible Best 2019	Fantasy	Finalist	
2019	Trail of Lightning	Compton Crook Award	—	Finalist	
2019	Trail of Lightning	Crawford Award	—	Shortlisted	
2019	Trail of Lightning	Hugo Award	Novel	Finalist	
2019	Trail of Lightning	Locus Award	First Novel	Won	
2019	Trail of Lightning	RUSA CODES Reading List	Fantasy	Shortlisted	
2019	Trail of Lightning	World Fantasy Award	Novel	Nominated	
2020	Black Sun	Goodreads Choice Award	Fantasy	Finalist	
2020	Black Sun	Nebula Award	Novel	Nominated	
2020	"A Brief Lesson in Native American Astronomy"	Ignyte Award	Short Story	Won	
2020	"A Brief Lesson in Native American Astronomy"	Locus Award	Short Story	Finalist	
2020	Star Wars: Resistance Reborn	Dragon Award	Media Tie-In Novel	Nominated	
2020	Storm of Locusts	Ignyte Award	Adult Novel	Finalist	
2020	Storm of Locusts	Locus Award	Fantasy Novel	Finalist	
2021	Black Sun	Alex Award	—	Won	
2021	Black Sun	Dragon Award	Science Fiction Novel	Nominated	
2021	Black Sun	Hugo Award	Novel	Finalist	
2021	Black Sun	Ignyte Award	Adult Novel	Won	
2021	Black Sun	Lambda Literary Award	Science Fiction/Fantasy/Horror	Finalist	
2021	Black Sun	Locus Award	Fantasy Novel	Finalist	
2021	Black Sun	RUSA CODES Reading List	Fantasy	Shortlisted	
2021	Race to the Sun	Igynte Award	Middle Grade Novel	Finalist	
2021	Race to the Sun	Locus Award	Young Adult Book	Finalist	
2023	The Best American Science Fiction and Fantasy 2022	Locus Award	Anthology	Finalist	
2023	Fevered Star	Locus Award	Fantasy Novel	Finalist	
2023	Tread of Angels	Locus Award	Novella	Finalist	
2024	A Murder at the End of the World	Writers Guild of America Award	Television: Limited Series	Nominated	
2024	Falling Bodies	Eugie Award	—	Finalist	
2025	Between Earth and Sky	Hugo Award	Hugo Award for Best Series	Won	
