= Welcome to Your Authentic Indian Experience™ =

Short story by Rebecca Roanhorse

- Short story by Rebecca Roanhorse
- Country: United States
- Language: English

Publication
- Published in: Apex Magazine
- Publication date: August 2017
- Awards: 2017 Nebula Award for Best Short Story; 2018 Hugo Award for Best Short Story

"Welcome to Your Authentic Indian Experience™" is a short story written by Rebecca Roanhorse and published in the August 2017 issue of Apex Magazine. The story was well-received; it won the 2017 Nebula Award for Best Short Story and the 2018 Hugo Award for Best Short Story. Her first professionally published work of speculative fiction, the story also earned Roanhorse the John W. Campbell Award for Best New Writer.

== Plot ==
The story is told from the second-person perspective of American Indian man Jesse Turnblatt (who uses Trueblood as his surname at work to appear more "Indian", to his wife Theresa's chagrin) who works at a tourist centre called Sedona Sweats that offers virtual reality Indian "Experiences". The employees base the Experiences and their performances on popular movies and stereotypes about Indian culture. After obsessing over Little Big Man, Jesse suggests a "Crazy Horse Experience" of Custer's Last Stand that fails to attract a single tourist: his Pima boss says that tourists come to Sedona Sweats to find themselves in a "spiritual experience", not a battle where the white man loses. Navajo DarAnne, along with other employees, protests the sexual objectification and racial slur in Boss's newest idea "Squaw Fantasy" that has become a bestseller among tourists. Jesse, feeling torn between saving face with his boss after the failure of Crazy Horse Experience and supporting DarAnne's group, decides Boss's approval is more important than DarAnne's and sides with him to her disgust.

Jesse does a "Vision Quest" Experience where he transforms into a caricature of a nonspecific Plains Indian "Spirit Guide" for a tourist who is disappointed at the artificial, inauthentic nature of the Experience. As the tourist tries to exit the Experience, a flustered Jesse gives him the Indian name (as is routine for the end of every Vision Quest Experience) of Pale Crow then corrects to White Wolf, knowing the tourist entered in his details that his favorite animal was a wolf.

At Sedona's local Hey U.S.A. Indian bar after work, DarAnne confronts Jesse and asks him what he really thinks about the "Squaw Fantasy". Learning Jesse was scared of Theresa leaving him if he loses his job, she encourages Jesse to stand up more at work, leaving before Jesse can reply. Upon leaving the bar, Jesse encounters White Wolf who apologizes for ruining the experience. Their conversation is against the rules, as employees are not allowed to speak with tourists outside of Experiences. White Wolf mentions his great grandmother is Cherokee, despite being pale-skinned - while Theresa calls these people "Pretendians", Jesse wants to give White Wolf the benefit of the doubt.

The next day, White Wolf requests a specifically Cherokee Vision Quest Experience to talk to Jesse and asks to meet again at the bar later that night. They begin to routinely meet for drinks at the bar on Tuesday and Friday nights, and after a month, Theresa begins to get suspicious. The following Tuesday, Jesse falls sick and is unable to come into work or meet White Wolf. His illness persists until Friday, and he asks Theresa to meet White Wolf and tell him that he's too sick to meet him. She returns home at one o'clock at night, drunk, seeming very pleased with White Wolf.

Jesse recovers and returns to work on Monday morning to find that Boss has laid him off and replaced him with White Wolf, considering him to be more authentic than Jesse. Unwilling to return home to Theresa and explain he was fired, Jesse goes to the Hey U.S.A. bar and begins drinking shots until nighttime. As he leaves, he runs into DarAnne as well as White Wolf, noticeably tanned and wearing American Indian clothing, who treats Jesse like a trouble-making drunk harassing DarAnne and pretends not to recognize him. White Wolf beats him and leaves him unconscious in the gutter.

Jesse wakes up the following day and returns home hoping to see Theresa but finds she and her belongings are gone and White Wolf sitting at the table. He explains he told Theresa about the firing and incident at the bar, and she went to stay at her mother's house for her safety and demands that Jesse leave. Realizing that White Wolf lied about being Indian to take Jesse's job, house, and wife, Jesse tries to protest when White Wolf tries to kick him out of the house. He asks if Jesse had never considered that he was the tourist in White Wolf's Experience. Jesse feels the same type of nausea he feels from the whiplash of Relocating in and out of an Experience, and "lets go" as if Relocating.

== Reception and awards ==
Year	Award	Category	Result	Ref.
2017	Nebula Award	Short Story	Won	
2018	Astounding Award for Best New Writer	—	Won	
2018	Hugo Award	Short Story	Won	
2018	Locus Award	Short Story	Finalist	
2018	Theodore Sturgeon Award	—	Finalist	
2018	World Fantasy Award	Short Fiction	Shortlisted	

== Adaptions ==
The story was read by LeVar Burton in an episode of his podcast LeVar Burton Reads published on July 24, 2018.

In March 2020, it was announced that "Welcome to Your Authentic Indian Experience™" was optioned by Amazon Studios for a potential film adaption.

== See also ==
- List of joint winners of the Hugo and Nebula awards
