= Trail of Lightning =

2018 novel by Rebecca Roanhorse

- First edition cover art
- Author: Rebecca Roanhorse
- Cover artist: Tommy Arnold
- Language: English
- Series: The Sixth World
- Genre: Fantasy; Speculative fiction
- Publisher: Saga Press
- Publication date: 2018
- Media type: Print
- Pages: 287
- Awards: Locus Award for Best First Novel
- ISBN: 9781534413498 1st e
- OCLC: 1003489349
- Dewey Decimal: 813/.6
- LC Class: PS3618.O283 T73 2018
- Followed by: Storm of Locusts

Trail of Lightning is a 2018 fantasy novel, the debut novel by Rebecca Roanhorse. After a supernatural disaster destroys most of North America, Navajo monster-slayer Maggie Hoskie must navigate a post-apocalyptic world of monsters and Native American gods. The novel won the 2019 Locus Award for Best First Novel and was a finalist for the Hugo, World Fantasy, and Nebula awards. The novel introduces a number of Navajo-inspired names for Maggie's antagonists. Neizghání is the most important of these, serving as mentor and adversary.

== Plot summary ==
In the 21st century, a worldwide flood caused by multiple earthquakes along the New Madrid fault line destroys most of the United States as magic returns to the world. Dinétah becomes an independent nation. Certain Navajo people develop clan powers based on their ancestral tribes.

On Maggie Hoskie's sixteenth birthday, her grandmother is murdered by witches and monsters. This traumatic event activates her clan powers, giving Maggie superhuman speed and a propensity for killing. She attracts the attention of the immortal monster-slayer Neizghání and becomes his apprentice. Neizghání trains her in the art of combat, but abandons her when he perceives that she is becoming too violent. Maggie becomes a bounty hunter and monster-slayer. She seeks information about a new breed of monster from Tah, a local medicine man. Tah tells her that the monster was created by a powerful witch. He asks her to work with his grandson Kai Arviso, who also possesses clan powers, to destroy the witch.

Maggie and Kai retrieve information about a relic known as a "fire drill", which may be related to the monsters. She is visited by Mąʼii, the Coyote; Mąʼii tells her that the drill belongs to Mósí, a cat goddess. He also requests that she complete a task for him, giving her magical rings. Tah's hogan burns down; Maggie suspects Neizghání. In the carnage, Maggie and Kai kill a corrupt police officer. They seek shelter with Grace Goodacre, a local bar owner. Maggie, Kai, and Grace's children begin working together.

Mósí promises to give the fire drill to the winner of a duel. Maggie agrees and is ordered to fight Neizghání. He brands her and almost kills her, but she is rescued by Kai. Maggie seeks revenge against Neizghání, believing him to be responsible for the death of Tah and the creation of the monsters. They return to Black Mesa, where Maggie last saw Neizghání.

As Kai and the Goodacres are ambushed by monsters on Black Mesa, Mąʼii appears and reveals to Maggie that he controls the monsters. He was responsible for the murder of her grandmother, leading to the activation of her clan powers; he was also responsible for Maggie's duel with Neizghání. He wants to forge Maggie into a powerful warrior. Furious at this revelation, Maggie kills him and returns to the battlefield, where Neizghání has defeated the monsters and is now threatening Kai, whom he considers to be a rival. Neizghání offers Maggie a choice: fight and die now, or betray Kai and return to him. Maggie kills Kai, believing that his clan powers will resurrect him. She then uses Mąʼii's rings to bind Neizghání, temporarily incapacitating him and removing his powers. At Maggie's trailer, Tah and Maggie wait for Kai to return.

== Background ==
Rebecca Roanhorse began writing fantasy as a hobby while pursuing a career as a lawyer. She stated that when she was unable to find a science fiction or fantasy novel with a Native American protagonist, she decided to write one, saying in 2019 that many Native American fictional characters are portrayed as stuck in the past, and she wanted to use her novel to show Native characters as "alive and thriving". Roanhorse has said that she is of Ohkay Owingeh Pueblo descent through her mother's family, and African American on her father's side. When she began publishing and doing speaking engagements, others pointed out that she is not an enrolled member of any tribal community. Leaders of the Ohkay Owingeh community have stated that Roanhorse is not enrolled there and has no connection to their community.

== Reception and awards ==
Trail of Lightning received mostly positive reviews from non-Native critics. The Verge called it a "much-needed perspective to the larger canon of fantasy fiction", praising it for its portrayal of Native American characters. Critics also praised Trail of Lightning for its fast-paced action and complex characters. Locus called the novel "immensely readable and very enjoyable" and praised it for its worldbuilding; it also criticized the novel for shallow dialogue and a disjointed plot structure.

The Diné Writers' Collective criticized the novel as cultural appropriation, stating that someone who is not a recognized member of the Diné tribal community "does not have the authority or experience to write about our people and culture". They feel that important Navajo spiritual beliefs were portrayed inaccurately and offensively. They also criticized the way in which some book reviewers, based on the author's writings, have conflated different tribes of Native Americans into one identity. Dr. Matthew Martinez, former Lieutenant Governor of Ohkay Owingeh (the tribal community the author claims descent from, but who do not claim her), said, "by not engaging in any form of cultural and community acknowledgement, Roanhorse has failed to establish any legitimate claim to call herself Ohkay Owingeh." He eventually concluded, "It is unethical for Roanhorse to be claiming Ohkay Owingeh and using this identity to publish Native stories."

At some point in 2018, when the complaints of cultural appropriation surfaced, references to the Ohkay Owingeh were removed from her official website; Roanhorse has stated that she believes her mother's family descended from Ohkay Owingeh people but is "trying to be more careful" about how she discusses it.

Year	Award	Category	Result	Ref.
2018	Nebula Award	Novel	Finalist	
2019	Compton Crook Award	—	Finalist	
2019	Crawford Award	—	Shortlisted	
2019	Hugo Award	Novel	Finalist	
2019	Locus Award	First Novel	Won	
2019	RUSA CODES Reading List	Fantasy	Shortlisted	
2019	World Fantasy Award	Novel	Finalist	
