= Pegah Ferydoni =

German actress

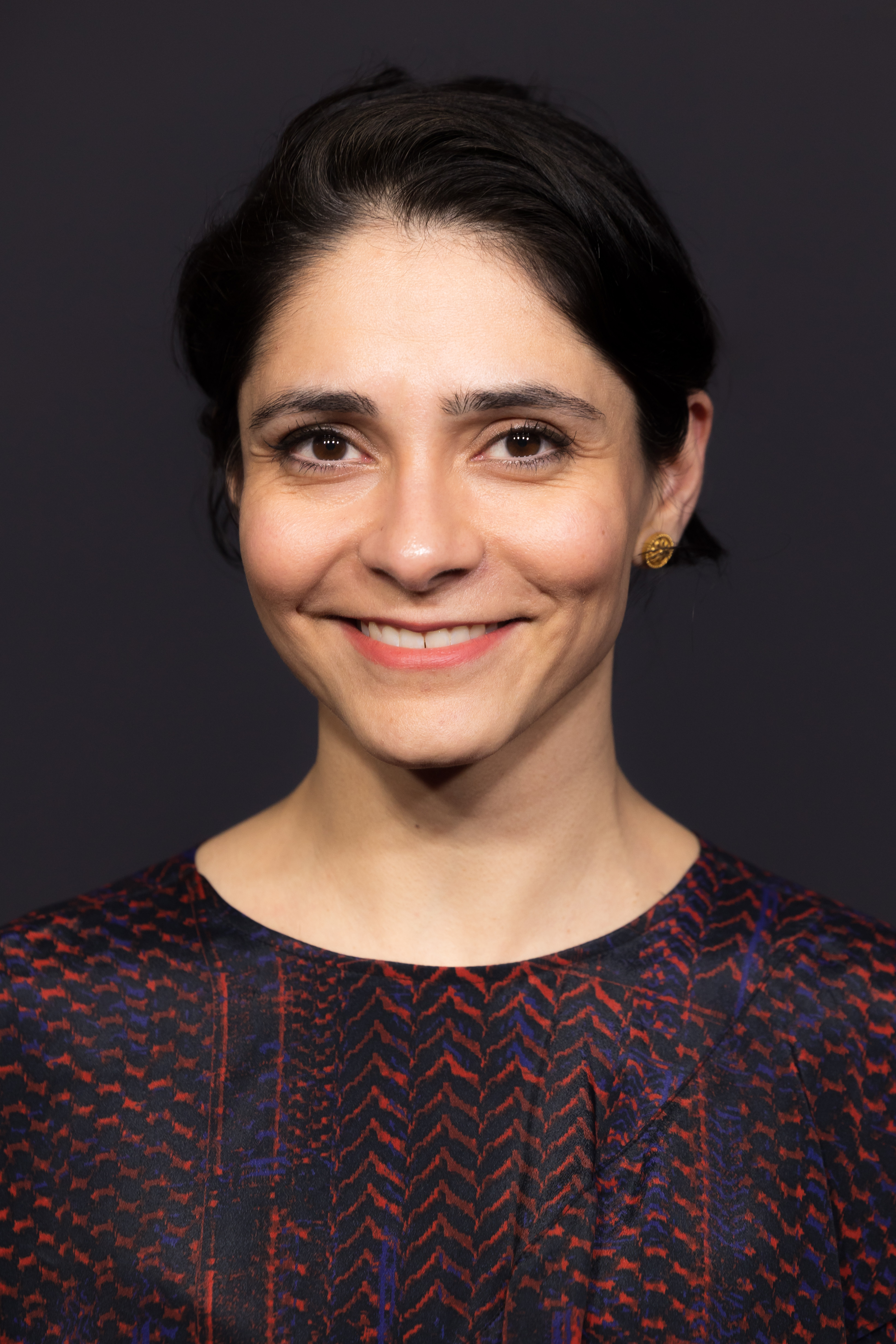
- Ferydoni at the 2024 Berlinale
- Born: June 25, 1983 (age 42); Tehran, Iran
- Occupation: Actress
- Known for: Film and television acting

Pegah Ferydoni (Persian: پگاه فریدونی; born June 25, 1983) is an Iranian-born German actress and singer. Ferydoni left Iran with her family when she was two years old, during the Iran–Iraq war. She started her career as a singer when she was age 16 but gave up singing in favour of acting.

== Filmography ==
Film
Year	Title	Role	Notes
2009	Rabbit Without Ears 2	Lana	
2009	Women Without Men	Faezeh	
2010	Ayla	Ayla	
2012	Turkish for Beginners	Yagmur Öztürk	
2013	300 Worte Deutsch	Lale Demirkan	
2015	Women Who Made History	Cleopatra	
2018	The Last Berliner	Shirin Kämper	
2018	A Dysfunctional Cat	Mina	
2020	Isi & Ossi	Teacher	

Television
Year	Title	Role	Notes
2006–2008	Türkisch für Anfänger ("Turkish for Beginners")	Yagmur Öztürk	German television comedy-drama series
2007, 2010	Der Kriminalist		
2019–present	SOKO Hamburg	Sara Khan	
2021–present	Almania	Sahra Nouri	
2023–present	A Murder at the End of the World	Ziba	American psychological thriller television miniseries on FX on Hulu.
