= Between Earth and Sky =

Fantasy novel series by Rebecca Roanhorse

- Cover art for Black Sun, the first novel in the series
- Black Sun; Fevered Star; Mirrored Heavens
- Author: Rebecca Roanhorse
- Cover artist: John Picacio
- Country: United States
- Language: English
- Publisher: Saga Press
- Published: Oct 13, 2020 (Black Sun); Apr 19, 2022 (Fevered Star); Jun 4, 2024 (Mirrored Heavens)
- Media type: Print, ebook
- No. of books: 3

Between Earth and Sky is a fantasy novel series by American writer Rebecca Roanhorse. It currently comprises three novels: Black Sun (2020), Fevered Star (2022), and Mirrored Heavens (2024). It is an epic fantasy series inspired by various pre-Columbian American cultures. Black Sun won the 2021 Alex Award and the 2021 Ignyte Award for Best Adult Novel; it was additionally a finalist for the Locus Award for Best Fantasy Novel, Nebula Award for Best Novel, and Hugo Award for Best Novel. The whole series won the 2025 Hugo Award for Best Series.

== Plot ==
=== Background ===
Three hundred years prior to the main story, the War of the Spear began after a spearwoman of Hokaia became the first dreamwalker. She led a conquering army across the continent of the Meridian, but was ultimately defeated. At the conclusion of the war, the Treaty of Hokaia established the Watchers, a quasi-religious institution in the city of Tova. The four great cities agreed to ban magic and the worship of all gods. In Tova, the Odohaa cult continued to worship the Crow God in secret. Decades before the story, the Watchers massacred many members of the Carrion Crow clan in an event that became known as the Night of Knives.

=== Black Sun ===
Serapio of the Carrion Crow clan is blinded and scarred in a religious ritual. He becomes the new incarnation of the Crow God. Years later, Captain Xiala is hired to transport him to the city of Tova by a man named Balam. Xiala's crew mutinies after learning that she has magical powers. Serapio summons an army of crows to kill the crew and save her.

In Tova, Naranpa serves as the Sun Priest, head of the Watchers. The citizens consist of four clans: Carrion Crow, Golden Eagle, Winged Serpent and Water Strider ('the Sky Made') as well as clanless people ('the dry earth'). Yatliza, leader of the Carrion Crow clan, dies mysteriously. Her son Okoa returns home to Tova from the 'war school' in Hokaia and attempts to prevent conflict with the Watchers. At Yatliza's funeral, a riot breaks out, and Okoa is falsely accused of an attempted assassination on Naranpa. The Watchers prepare for war with the Odohaa cult. Naranpa is ousted from her position as Sun Priest; her bodyguard and former lover Iktan (Note: Iktan is bayeki, a third gender. Iktan's pronouns are xe/xir.) supports this ouster. Naranpa seeks help from her brother Denaochi and Zataya, a witch. Rogue priests kill Naranpa; Zataya resurrects her.

Xiala and Serapio arrive in Tova. During an eclipse, Serapio kills most of the Watchers at Sun Rock. He is surprised to discover that Naranpa, the true Sun priest, is not there. He is severely injured but is rescued by Okoa. Time seems to freeze and a black sun hangs over Tova as the new year begins.

=== Fevered Star ===
In Cuecola, Balam learns to practice dreamwalking, which has been forbidden since the Treaty of Hokaia. Now that the Watchers are dead and the Treaty is broken, a power vacuum opens in the continent of the Meridian. Balam calls a meeting in the city of Hokaia. He plans to place the Golden Eagle clan in charge of Tova. He also plans to kill Serapio, whose survival was not intended.

In Tova, Naranpa meets with Denaochi. He intends to set her up as a symbol of resistance against the Carrion Crow clan. Serapio and Okoa return to the Carrion Crow district and meet with Okoa's sister Esa, the clan's new matron. Serapio quarrels with the leaders of the Carrion Crow about their plans for the future of Tova. Xiala goes to the Crow district, where she meets Iktan; they escape the district together and join the Golden Eagle clan on their journey to the meeting in Hokaia. Xiala learns that Iktan orchestrated Yatliza's death and that the Golden Eagle clan was behind the assassination attempt on Naranpa. Xiala confesses to Iktan that she has been exiled from Teek after killing her own mother. When Xiala reaches Hokaia, she learns that her mother is still alive. She is ordered to return to Teek, but she agrees to spy on her mother for Balam.

Naranpa calls a meeting of all the Sky Made clans, where she reestablishes the Coyote clan and accuses Golden Eagle of treachery. Conflict erupts and Denaochi is killed. Serapio and Naranpa fight to a draw at Sun Rock. Naranpa heals Serapio's wound and leaves the city. Serapio forms his own army from the Odohaa cult, builds a magical palace, and declares his intent to rule over the entire city rather than just the Carrion Crow clan.

=== Mirrored Heavens ===
A Cuecolan fleet led by Balam's co-conspirator Tuun lands in Teek. She brings news that the Teek queen was killed by Balam. Tuun forces the Teek to begin building ships for her. Xiala orchestrates an escape from Tuun and her soldiers; she summons a kraken to destroy the Cuecolans, but Tuun survives. Xiala pursues her to Hokaia.

The war college near Hokaia is destroyed, presumably by the Golden Eagle clan. Serapio kills all of the adult Golden Eagle scions in Tova and disbands the clan. Hokaia and Cuecola declare war on Tova and begin preparing an army. As revenge for the attack on the war college, Iktan stabs Balam and kills the Golden Eagle matron. Xe leaves Hokaia to search for Naranpa. Balam survives using his blood magic. Balam's dreamwalking powers continue to increase, but he begins to lose his grip on reality. Meanwhile, Naranpa trains in the art of dreamwalking. She and Iktan reunite. They marry and plan to trap Balam in the dream world.

Tuun arrives back in Hokaia, followed closely by Xiala. Balam is angry at Tuun's failure and sacrifices her, along with hundreds of prisoners. This opens a shadow gate which allows the army to reach Tova almost immediately, rather than a journey of weeks. Xiala follows, disguised as a worker.

Meanwhile, in Tova, Zataya gives Serapio a prophecy from the Coyote god which includes three tasks: “turn rotten fruit to flower”, “slay the god-bride still unloved”, and “press the son to fell the sire”. Despite winning the war, Serapio will lose everything else by completing these tasks. The matrons of Tova ask Okoa to kill Serapio. Serapio converts Okoa to his side, completing the first task. Serapio is betrothed to Isel Winged Serpent. On the night of his engagement feast, he kills his father Marcal, completing the third task. During the wedding ceremony, Okoa kills Isel, believing that she has a dagger aimed at Serapio. Okoa is taken away to be tortured by Winged Serpent. Serapio, who orchestrated this murder, helps him escape. Despite Serapio's actions so far, Zataya tells him that the Coyote god's tasks are not yet complete. Serapio surmises that he must kill his true love Xiala in order to win the war.

Xiala sneaks away from Balam's army and finds Okoa, who is scouting the army. Okoa delays a pursuer while Xiala escapes back to Tova, bringing news of Balam's nearby army. Serapio flies to meet Balam's forces. In the enemy camp, Okoa is stabbed to death by a Carrion Crow soldier as punishment for his betrayal of the matrons. A half-mad Balam opens a small shadow gate and enters Tova proper, hoping to find information in the Watchers' Tower. Serapio follows and in the process, learns that Balam is his biological father.

Naranpa enters the dream world. The sun god possesses her and attacks Tova; it believes that the city has been too corrupted by the crow god to be saved. The god burns the Great Houses, but Naranpa is able to protect the Watchers' tower from the fire. Serapio and Balam fight in the tower, but he realizes that killing Balam and completing the Coyote god's tasks will cause him lose Xiala. Xiala kills Balam. The crow god attempts to possess Serapio. He asks Xiala to stab him, ending the god's hold on him at the price of his life. Serapio's body breaks into a murder of crows, and they fly out of the tower, leaving Xiala behind. Naranpa is permanently trapped in the dream world. Iktan brings her sleeping body back to Tova.

Six years later, Queen Xiala is raising Akona, her son by Serapio. She finds Serapio, who has re-assembled into his human form and is beginning to regain his memories.

== Style ==
Black Sun features four point-of-view characters: Serapio, Xiala, Okoa, and Naranpa. The present-day timeline is interrupted with frequent flashbacks.

== Themes ==
Roanhorse researched Southeast Asian, Native American, and Mesoamerican civilizations while writing Black Sun, because she wanted to write fiction that was different from the traditional European settings of epic fantasy novels. She started by writing the character of Xiala, and stated that "all the other characters started to come together" afterwards.

Though the trilogy features many non-heterosexual and non-cisgender characters and has been praised for its inclusivity, a reviewer for SyFy pointed out that "queerness" is a product of white supremacy and colonization. In many pre-Columbian civilizations, queer identities would not be considered "other" but would be considered normal parts of those societies. Accordingly, these characters in the novels are not "tagged" or named as queer or other. Xiala's bisexuality is used to highlight the varying degrees of acceptance among different cultures. Other characters are non-binary and are described with neopronouns ('xe'/'xir'), and this is accepted in most cities in the trilogy's world.

== Adaptation ==
In December 2021, it was reported that AMC Studios will be adapting Black Sun into a television series with Roanhorse and Angela Kang as executive producers.

== Reception ==
In their Locus review of Black Sun, Alex Brown calls the book "a brilliant work of art", and lauds the characters, the worldbuilding, the magic system, and the way queerness is normalized and gender hierarchies absent in the world of the novel. Kirkus Reviews praised the characterization and political intrigue, calling it "the next big thing". Grimdark Magazine said Black Sun was "nearly impossible to put down", and praised the skilled combination of action and character-driven plot. Other reviews also praised it for its characterization and action sequences, as well as its positive and nuanced portrayal of queer characters.

Fevered Star received a positive review from Kirkus Reviews, which called it "an excellent second installment". It received a starred review from Library Journal, which called the novel "amazingly complex". Writing for Tor.com, Angela Maria Spring gave the second book a moderately positive review. She praised the complex plot and felt that Naranpa's character arc was the strongest of all of the characters, but felt that the pacing was slow and that the novel suffered from Serapio's separation from Xiala.

Alex Brown's Locus review of Mirrored Heavens pointed out the high expectations the first two books created for the final installment of the trilogy, and reassured that they were "not disappointed" by the "high drama and shocking moments" delivered. Brown writes, "Roanhorse has built a vast, intricate world unlike anything else out there. The trappings are familiar—young people resisting fate, gods enacting ancient feuds with human avatars, power-hungry madmen—but the execution is decidedly unique." Kirkus Reviews asserts that "Roanhorse’s fans won’t be surprised to hear that she’s crafted a complex, suspenseful, and ultimately satisfying ending to her masterful trilogy." Publishers Weekly called Roanhorse "in top form" and the conclusion to the series "satisfying". The review called the characters "three-dimensional" and praised Roanhorse for weaving "the myriad plot threads together seamlessly, building to an epic climax."

== Awards ==
Year	Book	Award	Category	Result	Ref.
2020	Black Sun	Goodreads Choice Award	Fantasy	Finalist	
2020	Black Sun	Nebula Award	Novel	Nominated	
2021	Black Sun	Alex Award	—	Won	
2021	Black Sun	Dragon Award	Science Fiction Novel	Nominated	
2021	Black Sun	Hugo Award	Novel	Finalist	
2021	Black Sun	Ignyte Award	Adult Novel	Won	
2021	Black Sun	Lambda Literary Award	Science Fiction/Fantasy/Horror	Finalist	
2021	Black Sun	Locus Award	Fantasy Novel	Finalist	
2021	Black Sun	RUSA CODES Reading List	Fantasy	Shortlisted	
2023	Fevered Star	Locus Award	Fantasy Novel	Finalist	
2025	Between Earth and Sky	Hugo Award	Hugo Award for Best Series	Won	
