= Charlotte Bruus Christensen =

Danish cinematographer

- Born: 20 March 1978 (age 48); Denmark
- Education: National Film and Television School
- Occupation: Cinematographer
- Website: charlottebruus.com

Charlotte Bruus Christensen (born 20 March 1978) is a Danish cinematographer.

== Biography ==
Born in Denmark, Christensen studied at European Film College in Ebeltoft from 1997 to 1998. She went on to study at the National Film and Television School in the UK, where she earned a master's degree in cinematography in 2004. After film school she returned to Denmark where she wrote, directed and shot the 2004 short film Between Us. She worked with director Thomas Vinterberg on his 2010 drama film Submarino. She was cinematographer for the Marc Evans' 2011 film Hunky Dory. She continued to work with Vinterberg in the 2012 film The Hunt. Her cinematography, shot on Arri Alexa, won her a Vulcan Award and the Bodil Award for Best Cinematographer. Christensen and Vinterberg teamed up a third time for the 2015 film Far from the Madding Crowd. She is known for ability to bring out the female gaze, highlighting the female leads in her films.

== Cinematography ==
A lot of Christensen's work is inspired from the Dogme 95 movement, where the focus is back on the traditional aspects of filmmaking such as stories, characters, and thematic elements. Christensen has spoken on her cinematography work on A Quiet Place through numerous interviews. A lot of the visual and tonal inspiration for the film came from other films like Jaws, No Country for Old Men, and There Will Be Blood. The film was shot on 35 mm, like the aforementioned movies. She has talked about how they had to capture images with sound in mind. The closer you are to something, the more little sounds are involved. It was more than just having the camera zoomed in on the subject and more about having the camera physically next to an object or person to catch all the sounds involved. Both Christensen and John Krasinski, the director, agreed that the film is warm and that those tones should be seen in various pockets- through the season (summer), clothing items, in nature, and elsewhere. She also had the challenge of working with the color red. Since the color is used to signal a warning, its thematic use isn't present until it needs to be; it's in that moment where it holds the most power. Her main goal was to highlight the unheard and unseen through her camera work. In other films like Fences and The Girl on the Train, you can clearly see how her cinematography impacts the suspense and intensity of the film. She knows how to highlight the emotions of the characters within the scene, especially lead females where she ensures they're highlighted in the right way.

== Filmography ==
=== Feature film ===
Year	Title	Director	Notes
2010	Submarino	Thomas Vinterberg	
2011	Hunky Dory	Marc Evans	
2012	The Hunt	Thomas Vinterberg	
2015	Life	Anton Corbijn	
2015	Far from the Madding Crowd	Thomas Vinterberg	
2016	The Girl on the Train	Tate Taylor	
2016	Fences	Denzel Washington	
2017	Molly's Game	Aaron Sorkin	
2018	A Quiet Place	John Krasinski	
2020	The Banker	George Nolfi	
2022	All the Old Knives	Janus Metz Pedersen	
2023	Sharper	Benjamin Caron	
2025	H is for Hawk	Philippa Lowthorpe	

=== Television ===
TV movie

Year	Title	Director
2008	Stacked	Jennifer Perrott

Miniseries

Year	Title	Director
2020	Black Narcissus	Herself
2023	A Murder at the End of the World	Brit Marling; Zal Batmanglij

== Awards and nominations ==
- Sue Gibson Award by The NFTS, 2017
- The WIFTS Cinematography Award, 2015
- Robert Nomination, Danish Film Academy 2013 for The Hunt
- Vulcan Award of the Technical Artist at the 2012 Cannes Film Festival for The Hunt (Jagten), directed by Thomas Vinterberg
- Robert Nomination, Danish Film Academy 2010 for Submarino
- Golden Frog Nomination, Camerimage 2010 for Submarino
- Broadcast Young Talent Award 2005 for Between Us
- BSC and Kodak Showcase Cinematographer Award 2005 for Between Us
- Best Cinematography Bulgaria 2004 for ISpider
