= Neal Huff =

American actor

- Born: New York City, U.S.
- Education: New York University (MFA)
- Occupation: Actor
- Years active: 1992–present

Neal Huff is an American actor from New York City. In April 2018, he performed as Willie Oban in the Broadway revival of The Iceman Cometh. In December 2018, Huff began performing in To Kill a Mockingbird, adapted for stage by Aaron Sorkin on Broadway at the Shubert Theatre as Link Deas.

== Life and career ==
He received his MFA from the Graduate Acting Program at New York University. He has appeared on Broadway in revivals of The Tempest (1995) and The Lion in Winter (1999) and the Tony Award-winning Take Me Out (2003). Off-Broadway he has appeared in The Foreigner (2004) and The Little Dog Laughed (2006).

Neal Huff portrayed chief of staff Michael Steintorf in The Wire. More recently, he appeared in A Murder at the End of the World. He played Roger, a ghoul, in Fallout.

On television Huff has also been featured in Law & Order, Six Degrees, Fringe, The Blacklist, Person of Interest, The Affair, Girls, The Sinner, and Brooklyn Nine-Nine.

== Filmography ==
=== Film ===
| Year | Title | Role | Notes |
|---|---|---|---|
| 1993 | The Wedding Banquet | Steve | |
| 1996 | Hitting the Ground | Howard | |
| 1999 | Big Daddy | Customer | |
| 2007 | The Good Shepherd | Teletype Operations Officer | |
| 2007 | Michael Clayton | First Associate | |
| 2010 | Meek's Cutoff | William White | |
| 2012 | Moonrise Kingdom | Jed | |
| 2012 | Jack and Diane | Jerry | |
| 2013 | Doomsdays | Ron | |
| 2014 | Runoff | Frank | |
| 2014 | The Grand Budapest Hotel | Lieutenant | |
| 2015 | Nasty Baby | Gallery Owner | |
| 2015 | Spotlight | Phil Saviano | |
| 2016 | No Letting Go | James | |
| 2016 | Split | Mr. Benoit | |
| 2017 | Beach Rats | Joe | |
| 2017 | The Post | Tom Winship | Uncredited |
| 2018 | Monsters and Men | Scout | |
| 2018 | Beirut | Ernie | |
| 2018 | All Square | Bill | |
| 2018 | Radium Girls | Dr. Flint | |
| 2019 | Waves | Bill | |
| 2022 | Causeway | Neuropsychologist | |
| 2023 | The Magnificent Meyersons | Father Joe | |
| 2024 | The Front Room | Pastor Lewis | |

=== Television ===
| Year | Title | Role | Notes |
|---|---|---|---|
| 1993–2008 | Law & Order | Various | 4 episodes |
| 2005 | Starved | Randy | 3 episodes |
| 2006–2007 | Six Degrees | Harry Kimble | 3 episodes |
| 2006–2008 | The Wire | Chief of Staff Michael Steintorf | 11 episodes |
| 2007–2013 | American Experience | Various | 5 episodes |
| 2008 | John Adams | Captain John Tucker | Episode: "Don't Tread on Me" |
| 2009–2012 | Fringe | Marshall Bowman | 2 episodes |
| 2010 | Damages | Actor | Episode: "All That Crap About Your Family" |
| 2013 | Blue Bloods | Leaf Memphis | Episode: "Fathers and Sons" |
| 2014 | Power | Todd | Episode: "Loyalty" |
| 2015 | Forever | Rich Dornis | Episode: "Punk Is Dead" |
| 2015 | Show Me a Hero | Brian Heffernan | 3 episodes |
| 2016 | Billions | Bert Kroll | Episode: "Naming Rights" |
| 2016 | Deadbeat | Mr. Fage | Episode: "Digging Up the Past" |
| 2016 | Person of Interest | Terry Easton | Episode: "Sotto Voce" |
| 2016–2017 | The Affair | Mr. Guttman | 2 episodes |
| 2016–2018 | Falling Water | Nicholas Hull | 8 episodes |
| 2016–2023 | The Blacklist | George Linley / Lucas Roth | 2 episodes |
| 2017 | Girls | Bar Guy | Episode: "What Will We Do This Time About Adam?" |
| 2017 | Genius | Robert Oppenheimer | Episode: "Einstein: Chapter Ten" |
| 2017 | The Mist | Doctor Bailey | 2 episodes |
| 2018 | Brooklyn Nine-Nine | NutriBoom Employee | Episode: "NutriBoom"; uncredited |
| 2018 | God Friended Me | Jack Kenny | Episode: "Unfriended" |
| 2021 | Mare of Easttown | Father Dan Hastings | 6 episodes |
| 2021 | The Sinner | Sean Muldoon | 8 episodes |
| 2022 | The Good Fight | Wesley Kirkpatrick | Episode: "The End of Eli Gold" |
| 2023 | A Murder at the End of the World | Darby's Dad | 2 episodes |
| 2024 | Fallout | Roger | Episode: "The Ghouls" |
| TBA | The Best of Us | Peter Allen | |

=== Stage ===
| Year | Title | Role | Notes |
|---|---|---|---|
| 1992 | Young Playwrights Festival | Jim (Mrs. Neuberger) | Off-Broadway |
| 1992 | Joined at the Head | College Boy/Bill/Others | Off-Broadway |
| 1994 | The Day the Bronx Died | Billy | Off-Broadway |
| 1995 | The Tempest | Adrian | Off-Broadway |
| 1995 | The Tempest | Adrian, Antonio (understudy), Ferdinand (understudy) | Broadway |
| 1998 | From Above | Jimmy | Off-Broadway |
| 1999 | The Lion in Winter | Geoffrey | Broadway |
| 2001 | Rude Entertainment | Shane/Timmy/Matthew | Off-Broadway |
| 2002 | Occupant | The Man | Off-Broadway |
| 2002 | Take Me Out | Kippy Sunderstrom | Off-Broadway |
| 2003 | Take Me Out | Kippy Sunderstrom | Broadway |
| 2004 | The Foreigner | Reverend David Marshall Lee | Off-Broadway |
| 2006 | The Little Dog Laughed | Mitchell | Off-Broadway |
| 2007 | Trumpery | Huxley | Off-Broadway |
| 2011 | When I Come To Die | Adrian Crouse | Off-Broadway Lincoln Center Theater LCT3 Production |
| 2014 | Indian Ink | Eldon Pike | Off-Broadway Roundabout Theatre Company |
| 2018 | The Iceman Cometh | Willie Oban | Broadway Revival Production |
| 2018 | To Kill a Mockingbird | Link Deas | Broadway; Shubert Theatre |
| 2019 | To Kill a Mockingbird | Bob Ewell | Broadway; Shubert Theatre |
