= The Mysterious Bookshop =

Bookstore and publisher in New York City

Coordinates: 40.7149°N 74.0093°W

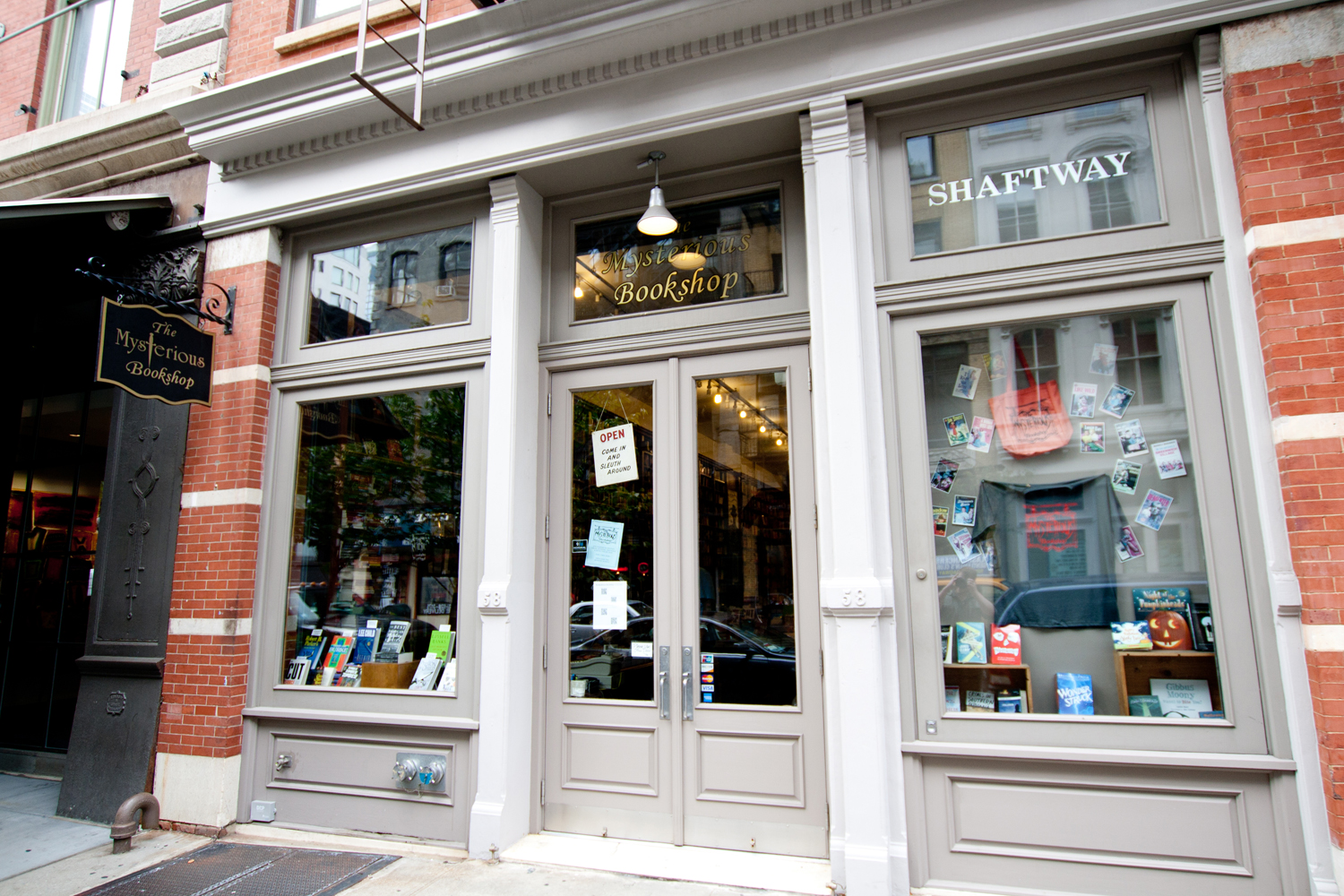
- The Mysterious Bookshop
- Industry: Bookselling, publishing
- Founded: 1979
- Headquarters: New York City, United States
- Products: Books
- Website: mysteriousbookshop.com

The Mysterious Bookshop is an independent bookstore and publisher specializing in mystery fiction, located in New York City. It is one of the oldest mystery bookstores in the U.S.

In addition to housing its own imprint, the shop contains the offices of Penzler Publishers, an independent publishing house consisting of the imprints The Mysterious Press, Scarlet, American Mystery Classics, and Crime Ink, all distributed by Simon & Schuster. The shop is also home to MysteriousPress.com, an e-book imprint distributed by Open Road Integrated Media. The store and its various publishing enterprises are owned and operated by editor and publisher Otto Penzler; its inventory consists of new and rare titles in detective fiction, crime fiction, spy fiction, thrillers, and various other mystery fiction subgenres.

== History ==
The Mysterious Bookshop opened on Friday 13 April 1979. In 2005, after 25 years at 129 West 56th Street, the building that housed the bookshop was sold, forcing the store to relocate to the Tribeca neighborhood. It is now located at 58 Warren Street.

== Publishing ==
The Mysterious Bookshop publishes limited editions of important works in the mystery genre, and has published various series of original works in the field. The most current of these is the store's Bibliomystery series, which features mystery novellas in which the plot involves a murder related to books or book collecting. Bestselling authors contributing to this series have included Ian Rankin, Joyce Carol Oates, and Nelson DeMille. John Connolly's story, "The Caxton Lending Library and Book Depository", won the 2014 Edgar Award for best short story. These books are published in both a limited hardcover edition and in paperback.

The bookstore's limited editions are bound in leather with marble boards, and have included titles by Michael Connelly and Lawrence Block, among others. They are currently in the process of printing a limited edition of the entirety of Lee Child's Jack Reacher series.
