= List of Independent Lens films =

This is a list of films from the Independent Lens series on PBS. All airdates are relative to this series as many of these films were screened, either in theaters or on television, before becoming a part of the Independent Lens series. After the third season, PBS expanded and relaunched the series in 2003 declaring what is technically the fourth season as the new first season. As a result, any reference made by PBS or ITVS to a season number will be three less than the number represented in this list. For example, PBS declares the 2007–2008 season as season 6, but this complete list shows it as season 9. The 2025–2026 season is regarded as the 27th season for the series.

== Series overview ==
| Season | Episodes | Originally released | |
| Season | Episodes | First released | Last released |
|---|---|---|---|
| 1 | 10 | August 9, 1999 | October 11, 1999 |
| 2 | 10 | October 2, 2000 | December 4, 2000 |
| 3 | 10 | September 7, 2001 | November 9, 2001 |
| 4 | 14 | February 4, 2003 | June 3, 2003 |
| 5 | 28 | October 14, 2003 | June 15, 2004 |
| 6 | 27 | October 26, 2004 | June 14, 2005 |
| 7 | 29 | October 11, 2005 | June 22, 2006 |
| 8 | 27 | October 24, 2006 | June 5, 2007 |
| 9 | 26 | October 16, 2007 | June 19, 2008 |
| 10 | 25 | October 22, 2008 | June 19, 2009 |
| 11 | 27 | October 13, 2009 | June 1, 2010 |
| 12 | 25 | October 19, 2010 | June 14, 2011 |
| 13 | 27 | October 13, 2011 | July 26, 2012 |
| 14 | 18 | October 1, 2012 | June 17, 2013 |
| 15 | 22 | September 30, 2013 | June 16, 2014 |
| 16 | 19 | October 13, 2014 | June 22, 2015 |
| 17 | 20 | October 20, 2015 | August 1, 2016 |
| 18 | 21 | October 3, 2016 | June 19, 2017 |
| 19 | 20 | October 11, 2017 | May 28, 2018 |
| 20 | 20 | October 29, 2018 | May 20, 2019 |
| 21 | 19 | October 29, 2019 | June 22, 2020 |
| 22 | 15 | October 19, 2020 | June 28, 2021 |
| 23 | 15 | October 11, 2021 | May 16, 2022 |
| 24 | 16 | September 12, 2022 | June 20, 2023 |
| 25 | 16 | September 19, 2023 | May 24, 2024 |
| 26 | 15 | September 16, 2024 | May 19, 2025 |
| 27 | TBA | October 6, 2025 | 2026 |

== Episodes ==
=== Season 1 (1999) ===
| No. overall | No. in season | Title | Directed by | Original release date |
|---|---|---|---|---|
| 1 | 1 | Wannabe: Life and Death in a Small-Town Gang | John Whitehead | August 9, 1999 |
| 2 | 2 | Nothing But the Truth | Mark Steven Shepherd | August 16, 1999 |
| 3 | 3 | Visas and Virtue I Am Viet Hung† | Chris Tashima Diep N. Bui | August 23, 1999 |
| 4 | 4 | The Man Who Drove with Mandela | Greta Schiller | August 30, 1999 |
| 5 | 5 | The Jew in the Lotus | Laurel Chiten | September 6, 1999 |
| 6 | 6 | Holy Tortilla Lock and Key† | Lauren Ivy Chiong Kisha Cameron | September 13, 1999 |
| 7 | 7 | And Baby Makes Two | Oren Rudavsky and Judy Katz | September 20, 1999 |
| 8 | 8 | Sing Faster: The Stagehands' Ring Cycle | Jon H. Else | September 27, 1999 |
| 9 | 9 | Secret People | John Anderson and Laura Harrison | October 4, 1999 |
| 10 | 10 | I Can't Believe I Married A Lesbian | Stuart Perkin | October 11, 1999 |

=== Season 2 (2000) ===
| No. overall | No. in season | Title | Directed by | Original release date |
|---|---|---|---|---|
| 11 | 1 | Now & Then: From Frosh to Seniors | Daniel Geller and Dayna Goldfine | October 2, 2000 |
| 12 | 2 | No Hair Day | Bob Burns | October 9, 2000 |
| 13 | 3 | Short Stories | Robert Byrd | October 16, 2000 |
| 14 | 4 | Born in the USA | Marcia Jarmel | October 23, 2000 |
| 15 | 5 | Girl Gone Bad | Louis Yansen | October 30, 2000 |
| 16 | 6 | Passing Through Graham's Diner† | Nathan Adolfson Courtney Byrd | November 6, 2000 |
| 17 | 7 | The Return of Navajo Boy | Jeff Spitz | November 13, 2000 |
| 18 | 8 | Music in Their Bones | Norton Dill | November 20, 2000 |
| 19 | 9 | In Harm's Way Carved from the Heart† | Jan Krawitz Ellen Frankenstein | November 27, 2000 |
| 20 | 10 | A Wok in Progress | Paul Kwan and Arnold Iger | December 4, 2000 |

=== Season 3 (2001) ===
| No. overall | No. in season | Title | Directed by | Original release date |
|---|---|---|---|---|
| 21 | 1 | Confederacy Theory | Ryan Deussing | September 7, 2001 |
| 22 | 2 | Secrets of Silicon Valley | Alan Snitow and Deborah Kaufman | September 14, 2001 |
| 23 | 3 | Abandoned: The Betrayal of America's Immigrants | David Belle and Nicholas Wrathall | September 21, 2001 |
| 24 | 4 | Good Kurds, Bad Kurds | Kevin McKiernan | September 28, 2001 |
| 25 | 5 | Who Owns the Past? | Jed Riffe | October 5, 2001 |
| 26 | 6 | The Split Horn: Life of a Hmong Shaman in America | Taggart Siegel | October 12, 2001 |
| 27 | 7 | Undetectable | Jay Corcoran | October 19, 2001 |
| 28 | 8 | Gibtown | Melissa Shachat | October 26, 2001 |
| 29 | 9 | Open Outcry | Jon Else | November 2, 2001 |
| 30 | 10 | Romancing the Throne | Dominic Ozanne | November 9, 2001 |

=== Season 4 (2003) ===
Note: After the third season, PBS expanded and relaunched the series in 2003 declaring what is technically the fourth season as the new first season. As a result, any reference made by PBS or ITVS to a season number will be three less than the number represented in this list. For example, PBS declares the 2007–08 season as season 6, but this complete list shows it as season 9.

| No. overall | No. in season | Title | Directed by | Original release date |
|---|---|---|---|---|
| 31 | 1 | Maggie Growls | Barbara Attie and Janet Goldwater | February 4, 2003 |
| 32 | 2 | Off the Charts: The Song-Poem Story | Jamie Meltzer | February 11, 2003 |
| 33 | 3 | On This Island | Stephanie Slewka | February 18, 2003 |
| 34 | 4 | Downside Up | Nancy Kelly | February 25, 2003 |
| 35 | 5 | Los Trabajadores/The Workers | Heather Courtney | March 25, 2003 |
| 36 | 6 | Chiefs | Daniel Junge | April 1, 2003 |
| 37 | 7 | Strange Fruit | Joel Katz | April 8, 2003 |
| 38 | 8 | Bird by Bird with Annie | Freida Lee Mock | April 22, 2003 |
| 39 | 9 | Sisters in Resistance | Maia Wechsler | April 29, 2003 |
| 40 | 10 | Heart of the Sea | Charlotte Lagarde and Lisa Denker | May 6, 2003 |
| 41 | 11 | Guns & Mothers | Thom Powers | May 13, 2003 |
| 42 | 12 | Razing Appalachia | Sasha Waters | May 20, 2003 |
| 43 | 13 | Hansel Mieth: Vagabond Photographer | Nancy Schiesari | May 27, 2003 |
| 44 | 14 | Daddy & Papa | Johnny Symons | June 3, 2003 |

=== Season 5 (2003–04) ===
Episode 510 is a short film block titled "Man Bites Shorts".
Episode 518 "T-Shirt Travels" was first broadcast on PBS on June 1, 2002, but not as part of the Independent Lens series.
* The New Americans is a seven-hour, three-part special, and therefore does not have an episode number.

| No. overall | No. in season | Title | Directed by | Original release date |
|---|---|---|---|---|
| 45 | 1 | Worst Possible Illusion: The Curiosity Cabinet of Vik Muniz | Anne-Marie Russell | October 14, 2003 |
| 46 | 2 | Foto-Novelas 2: Broken Sky Foto-Novelas 2: Junkyard Saints† | Carlos Avila | October 21, 2003 |
| 47 | 3 | Shaolin Ulysses: Kungfu Monks in America | Martha Burr and Mei-Juin Chen | October 28, 2003 |
| 48 | 4 | A Wedding in Ramallah | Sherine Salama | November 4, 2003 |
| 49 | 5 | Be Good, Smile Pretty | Tracy Droz Tragos | November 11, 2003 |
| 50 | 6 | Livermore | Rachel Raney and David Murray | November 25, 2003 |
Subject: Livermore, California
| 51 | 7 | Eroica! | Alan Miller | December 9, 2003 |
| 52 | 8 | Loaded Gun: Life, and Death, and Dickinson | Jim Wolpaw | December 16, 2003 |
| 53 | 9 | Get the Fire! Young Mormon Missionaries Abroad | Nancy du Plessis | December 23, 2003 |
| 54 | 10 | Compulsory Breathing Don't Nobody Love the Game More Than Me Sergi Dilly Dally Tom Hits His Head Bike Ride† | David Munro Martha Pinson Paul Sullivan Mark Pellington Tom Putnam Tom Schroeder | December 30, 2003 |
| 55 | 11 | Make 'em Dance: The Hackberry Ramblers' Story | John Whitehead | January 13, 2004 |
| 56 | 12 | Life Matters | Kyle Boyd | January 20, 2004 |
| 57 | 13 | Why Can't We Be a Family Again? Downpour Resurfacing† | Roger Weisberg and Murray Nossel Frances Nkara | January 27, 2004 |
| 58 | 14 | Nat Turner: A Troublesome Property | Charles Burnett | February 10, 2004 |
| 59 | 15 | A Place of Our Own | Stanley Nelson Jr. | February 17, 2004 |
| 60 | 16 | Jimmy Scott: If You Only Knew | Matthew Buzzell | February 24, 2004 |
| 61 | 17 | Sentencing the Victim | Liz Oakley | March 2, 2004 |
| 62 | 18 | T-Shirt Travels | Shantha Bloemen | March 23, 2004 |
| N/A | N/A | The New Americans Episode One | Unknown | March 29, 2004 |
| N/A | N/A | The New Americans Episode Two | Unknown | March 30, 2004 |
| N/A | N/A | The New Americans Episode Three | Unknown | March 31, 2004 |
| 63 | 19 | Every Child is Born a Poet: The Life and Work of Piri Thomas | Jonathan Robinson | April 6, 2004 |
| 64 | 20 | Love Inventory | David Fisher | April 13, 2004 |
| 65 | 21 | Ram Dass: Fierce Grace | Mickey Lemle | April 20, 2004 |
| 66 | 22 | The Weather Underground | Sam Green | April 27, 2004 |
| 67 | 23 | One Night at the Grand Star Double Exposure† | Natasha Uppal Kit-Yin Snyder | May 4, 2004 |
| 68 | 24 | Refugee | Spencer Nakasako | May 11, 2004 |
| 69 | 25 | Death of a Shaman | Richard Hall | May 27, 2004 |
| 70 | 26 | Cosmopolitan | Nisha Ganatra | June 1, 2004 |
| 71 | 27 | Sumo East and West | Ferne Pearlstein | June 8, 2004 |
| 72 | 28 | The Amasong Chorus: Singing Out | Jay Rosenstein | June 15, 2004 |

=== Season 6 (2004–05) ===
Episode 608 is a short film block titled "Short, Not Sweet".

| No. overall | No. in season | Title | Directed by | Original release date |
|---|---|---|---|---|
| 73 | 1 | The Political Dr. Seuss | Ron Lamothe | October 26, 2004 |
| 74 | 2 | Polka Time | Lisa Blackstone | November 9, 2004 |
| 75 | 3 | Afghanistan Unveiled | Brigitte Brault | November 16, 2004 |
| 76 | 4 | Los Angeles Now | Phillip Rodriguez | November 23, 2004 |
| 77 | 5 | The Day My God Died | Andrew Levine | November 30, 2004 |
| 78 | 6 | Girl Wrestler | Diane Zander | December 14, 2004 |
| 79 | 7 | Fine. Doki-Doki† | Michael Downing Chris Eska | December 21, 2004 |
| 80 | 8 | The Fine Line Between Cute and Creepy La Puppé A Monster's Calling The School Why the Anderson Children Didn't Come to Dinner† | Robert D. Slane Timothy Greenberg Louise Johnson Ezra Krybus and Matthew Miller Jamie Travis | December 28, 2004 |
| 81 | 9 | A Hard Straight | Goro Toshima | January 4, 2005 |
| 82 | 10 | A Touch of Greatness | Leslie Sullivan | January 11, 2005 |
| 83 | 11 | Power Trip | Paul Devlin | January 25, 2005 |
| 84 | 12 | February One: The Story of the Greensboro Four | Unknown | February 1, 2005 |
| 85 | 13 | On a Roll | Joanne Caputo | February 15, 2005 |
| 86 | 14 | Thunder in Guyana | Suzanne Wasserman | February 22, 2005 |
| 87 | 15 | Sisters of '77 | Cynthia Salzman Mondell and Allen Mondell | March 1, 2005 |
| 88 | 16 | Sunset Story | Laura Gabbert | March 22, 2005 |
| 89 | 17 | Let the Church Say Amen | David Petersen | March 29, 2005 |
| 90 | 18 | A Lion's Trail | François Verster | April 5, 2005 |
| 91 | 19 | Keeping Time: The Life, Music and Photographs of Milt Hinton | David G. Berger, Holly Maxson and Kate Hirson | April 12, 2005 |
| 92 | 20 | End of the Century: The Ramones Joe Strummer Rocks Again† | Michael Gramaglia and Jim Fields Dick Rude | April 26, 2005 |
| 93 | 21 | The Last Letter Zyklon Portrait The Walnut Tree† | Frederick Wiseman Elida Schogt | May 3, 2005 |
| 94 | 22 | Imelda | Ramona Diaz | May 10, 2005 |
| 95 | 23 | Vietnam: The Next Generation | Sandy Northrop | May 17, 2005 |
| 96 | 24 | Red Hook Justice | Meema Spadola | May 24, 2005 |
| 97 | 25 | Double Dare Piki and Poko: Taking the Dare!† | Amanda Micheli Mark Ewert and David Cutler | May 31, 2005 |
| 98 | 26 | Chavez Ravine: A Los Angeles Story | Jordan Mechner | June 7, 2005 |
| 99 | 27 | Brother to Brother | Rodney Evans | June 14, 2005 |

=== Season 7 (2005–06) ===
Episode 710 is a short film block titled "Short Stack: Lost & Found".

| No. overall | No. in season | Title | Directed by | Original release date |
|---|---|---|---|---|
| 100 | 1 | Parliament-Funkadelic: One Nation Under A Groove | Yvonne Smith | October 11, 2005 |
| 101 | 2 | En Route to Baghdad | Simone Duarte | October 18, 2005 |
| 102 | 3 | The Last Cowboy | Jon Alpert | October 25, 2005 |
| 103 | 4 | A Family at War | Jørgen Flindt Pedersen | November 8, 2005 |
| 104 | 5 | Mirror Dance | Frances McElroy and María Teresa Rodríguez | November 15, 2005 |
| 105 | 6 | Race is the Place | Raymond Telles and Rick Tejada-Flores | November 22, 2005 |
| 106 | 7 | Maid in America | Anayansi Prado | November 29, 2005 |
| 107 | 8 | Seoul Train | Jim Butterworth, Lisa Sleeth and Aaron Lubarsky | December 13, 2005 |
| 108 | 9 | Sisters: Portrait of a Benedictine Community | John Hanson | December 20, 2005 |
| 109 | 10 | Agora John and Michael Miracle Mile The Raftman's Razor Reservation Warparties† | Chris Newberry Shira Avni Dong Hyeuk Hwang Keith Bearden Angelique Midthunder | December 27, 2005 |
| 110 | 11 | Sheriff | Daniel Kraus | January 3, 2006 |
| 111 | 12 | Girl Trouble | Lexi Leban and Lidia Szajko | January 17, 2006 |
| 112 | 13 | Almost Home | Brad Lichtenstein and Lisa Gildehaus | January 31, 2006 |
| 113 | 14 | Negroes with Guns: Rob Williams and Black Power | Sandra Dickson and Churchill Roberts | February 7, 2006 |
| 114 | 15 | July '64 | Chris Christopher and Carvin Eison | February 14, 2006 |
| 115 | 16 | The Loss of Nameless Things | Bill Rose | February 28, 2006 |
| 116 | 17 | Troop 1500 | Ellen Spiro | March 21, 2006 |
| 117 | 18 | Taking the Heat: The First Women Firefighters of New York City | Bann Roy | March 28, 2006 |
| 118 | 19 | Trudell | Heather Rae | April 11, 2006 |
| 119 | 20 | La Sierra | Scott Dalton and Margarita Martinez | April 18, 2006 |
| 120 | 21 | A League of Ordinary Gentlemen | Chris Browne | April 25, 2006 |
| 121 | 22 | Music from the Inside Out | Daniel Anker | May 2, 2006 |
| 122 | 23 | Fishbowl American Made† | Kayo Hatta Sharat Raju | May 9, 2006 |
| 123 | 24 | Frozen Angels | Eric Black and Frauke Sandig | May 16, 2006 |
| 124 | 25 | The Devil's Miner | Kief Davidson and Richard Ladkani | May 23, 2006 |
| 125 | 26 | The Great Pink Scare | Tug Yourgrau and Dan Miller | June 6, 2006 |
| 126 | 27 | The Real Dirt on Farmer John | Taggart Siegel | June 13, 2006 |
| 127 | 28 | "A Lion in the House" (Part 1) | Steven Bognar and Julia Reichert | June 21, 2006 |
| 128 | 29 | "A Lion in the House" (Part 2) | Steven Bognar and Julia Reichert | June 22, 2006 |

=== Season 8 (2006–07) ===
Episode 803, "Still Life with Animated Dogs," was first broadcast on PBS on March 29, 2001, but not as part of the Independent Lens series.
Episode 809 is a short film block titled "Short Stack 2006".

| No. overall | No. in season | Title | Directed by | Original release date |
|---|---|---|---|---|
| 129 | 1 | The World According to Sesame Street | Linda Goldstein Knowlton and Linda Hawkins Costigan | October 24, 2006 |
| 130 | 2 | Muskrat Lovely | Amy Nicholson | October 31, 2006 |
| 131 | 3 | Still Life with Animated Dogs† | Paul Fierlinger | October 24, 2006 |
| 132 | 4 | Paul Conrad: Drawing Fire | Barbara Multer-Wellin | November 7, 2006 |
| 133 | 5 | Democracy on Deadline: The Global Struggle for an Independent Press | Cal Skaggs | November 21, 2006 |
| 134 | 6 | Two Square Miles | Barbara Ettinger | November 28, 2006 |
| 135 | 7 | A Sad Flower in the Sand | Jan Louter | December 12, 2006 |
| 136 | 8 | Revolucion: Five Visions | Nicole Cattell | December 19, 2006 |
| 137 | 9 | Paris, 1951 Someday Flowers Bloom The Zit My Life Disoriented† | Jasmin Gordon Mai Heiselmann Mike Blum Eric Byler | December 26, 2006 |
| 138 | 10 | A Fish Story | Courtney Hayes and Tim Gallagher | January 2, 2007 |
| 139 | 11 | Shadya | Roy Westler | January 16, 2007 |
| 140 | 12 | Beyond the Call | Adrian Belic | January 23, 2007 |
| 141 | 13 | Twisted | Laurel Chiten | January 30, 2007 |
| 142 | 14 | Billy Strayhorn: Lush Life | Robert Levi | February 6, 2007 |
| 143 | 15 | Motherland Afghanistan | Sedika Mojadidi | February 13, 2007 |
| 144 | 16 | Hip-Hop: Beyond Beats and Rhymes | Byron Hurt | February 20, 2007 |
| 145 | 17 | Can Mr. Smith Get to Washington Anymore? | Frank Popper | February 27, 2007 |
| 146 | 18 | Stolen | Rebecca Dreyfus | March 20, 2007 |
| 147 | 19 | Race to Execution | Rachel Lyon | March 27, 2007 |
| 148 | 20 | China Blue | Micha X. Peled | April 3, 2007 |
| 149 | 21 | Black Gold | Marc Francis and Nick Francis | April 10, 2007 |
| 150 | 22 | Enron: The Smartest Guys in the Room | Alex Gibney | April 24, 2007 |
| 151 | 23 | The Cats of Mirikitani | Linda Hattendorf | May 8, 2007 |
| 152 | 24 | Sentenced Home | Nicole Newnham and David Grabias | May 15, 2007 |
| 153 | 25 | Knocking | Joel P. Engardio and Tom Shepard | May 22, 2007 |
| 154 | 26 | The Wild Parrots of Telegraph Hill | Judy Irving | May 29, 2007 |
| 155 | 27 | La Lupe: Queen of Latin Soul | Ela Troyano | June 5, 2007 |

=== Season 9 (2007–08) ===
| No. overall | No. in season | Title | Directed by | Original release date |
|---|---|---|---|---|
| 156 | 1 | Wordplay | Patrick Creadon | October 16, 2007 |
Subject: Crossword puzzle solvers
| 157 | 2 | Please Vote for Me | Weijun Chen | October 23, 2007 |
Subject: Chinese primary school election
| 158 | 3 | Storm of Emotions | Yael Klopmann | October 30, 2007 |
Subject: Israeli disengagement from the Gaza Strip
| 159 | 4 | Red White Black & Blue | Tom Putnam | November 6, 2007 |
Subject: Battle of Attu
| 160 | 5 | Miss Navajo | Billy Luther | November 13, 2007 |
Subject: Seven girls compete the Miss Navajo Nation pageant
| 161 | 6 | The Creek Runs Red | Bradley Beesley and Julianna Brannum | November 20, 2007 |
Subject: Picher, Oklahoma
| 162 | 7 | Sisters in Law | Kim Longinotto and Florence Ayisi | November 27, 2007 |
Subject:
| 163 | 8 | The Paper | Aaron Matthews | December 11, 2007 |
Subject:
| 164 | 9 | An Unreasonable Man | Henriette Mantel and Steve Skrovan | December 18, 2007 |
Subject: Ralph Nader
| 165 | 10 | Today's Man | Lizzie Gottlieb | January 8, 2008 |
Subject: Asperger syndrome
| 166 | 11 | Mapping Stem Cell Research: Terra Incognita | Maria Finitzo | January 15, 2008 |
Subject: Stem cell research
| 167 | 12 | A Son's Sacrifice | Yoni Brook | January 22, 2008 |
Subject:
| 168 | 13 | How Is Your Fish Today? | Xiaolu Guo | January 29, 2008 |
Subject: Part drama, part documentary about screenwriting
| 169 | 14 | Banished | Marco Williams | February 19, 2008 |
Subject: Banishment of blacks in post-Civil War America
| 170 | 15 | Hard Road Home | Macky Alston | February 26, 2008 |
Subject:
| 171 | 16 | Iron Ladies of Liberia | Daniel Junge and Siatta Scott Johnson | March 18, 2008 |
Subject: Beauty pageant
| 172 | 17 | Compañeras | Matthew Buzzell and Elizabeth Massie | April 1, 2008 |
Subject: Mariachi Reyna de Los Angeles
| 173 | 18 | Water Flowing Together | Gwendolen Cates | April 8, 2008 |
Subject: Jock Soto
| 174 | 19 | King Corn | Aaron Woolf | April 15, 2008 |
Subject: Industrialization of maize farming
| 175 | 20 | Na Kamalei: The Men of Hula | Lisette Marie Flanary | May 6, 2008 |
Subject: Halau Na Kamalei
| 176 | 21 | A Dream in Doubt | Tami Yeager | May 20, 2008 |
Subject:
| 177 | 22 | New Year Baby | Socheata Poeuv | May 27, 2008 |
Subject:
| 178 | 23 | Writ Writer | Susanne E. Mason | June 3, 2008 |
Subject: Cruz v. Beto
| 179 | 24 | The Cool School | Morgan Neville | June 10, 2008 |
Subject: Ferus Gallery
| 180 | 25 | Deep Water | Louise Osmond and Jerry Rothwell | June 15, 2008 |
Subject: Donald Crowhurst's attempted circumnavigation
| 181 | 26 | Abduction: The Megumi Yokota Story | Chris Sheridan and Patty Kim | June 19, 2008 |
Subject: North Korean abduction of Megumi Yokota

=== Season 10 (2008–09) ===
| No. overall | No. in season | Title | Directed by | Original release date |
|---|---|---|---|---|
| 182 | 1 | Chicago 10 | Brett Morgen | October 22, 2008 |
Subject: Chicago Seven trial
| 183 | 2 | Dinner With the President | Sabiha Sumar and S. Sathananthan | October 28, 2008 |
Subject: Pervez Musharraf
| 184 | 3 | Knee Deep | Michael Chandler | November 6, 2008 |
Subject:
| 185 | 4 | Lioness | Meg McLagan and Daria Sommers | November 13, 2008 |
Subject: Women in the United States armed forces
| 186 | 5 | March Point | Annie Silverstein | November 18, 2008 |
Subject: Swinomish (tribe)
| 187 | 6 | The Atom Smashers | Clayton Brown and Monica Long Ross | November 25, 2008 |
Subject: Fermilab
| 188 | 7 | Doc | Immy Humes | December 9, 2008 |
Subject: Harold L. Humes
| 189 | 8 | Wonders Are Many: The Making of Doctor Atomic | Jon H. Else | December 16, 2008 |
Subject: Opera based on Trinity (nuclear test)
| 190 | 9 | Grey Gardens: From East Hampton to Broadway | Albert Maysles Albert Maysles | December 23, 2008 |
Subject: Making of Grey Gardens (musical)
| 191 | 10 | Operation Filmmaker | Nina Davenport | December 30, 2008 |
Subject: Making of Everything Is Illuminated (film)
| 192 | 11 | Helvetica | Gary Hustwit | January 6, 2009 |
Subject: Helvetica
| 193 | 12 | Adjust Your Color: The Truth of Petey Greene | Loren Mendell | February 3, 2009 |
Subject:
| 194 | 13 | Tulia, Texas | Cassandra Herrman and Kelly Whalen | February 10, 2009 |
Subject: 1999 Tulia drug arrests
| 195 | 14 | Order of Myths | Margaret Brown | February 24, 2009 |
Subject: Mobile, Alabama's Carnival celebration
| 196 | 15 | Arusi Persian Wedding | Marjan Tehrani | March 17, 2009 |
Subject:
| 197 | 16 | Lakshmi and Me | Nishtha Jain | March 24, 2009 |
Subject:
| 198 | 17 | Recycle | Mahmoud al Massad | March 31, 2009 |
Subject:
| 199 | 18 | Milking the Rhino | David E. Simpson | April 7, 2009 |
Subject:
| 200 | 19 | Taking Root: The Vision of Wangari Maathai | Alan Dater and Lisa Merton | April 14, 2009 |
Subject: Wangari Maathai
| 201 | 20 | Steal a Pencil for Me | Michèle Ohayon | May 26, 2009 |
Subject:
| 202 | 21 | At Home in Utopia | Michal Goldman | April 28, 2009 |
Subject:
| 203 | 22 | Wings of Defeat | Risa Morimoto | May 5, 2009 |
Subject:
| 204 | 23 | Crips and Bloods: Made in America | Stacy Peralta | May 12, 2009 |
Subject:
| 205 | 24 | Stranded: The Andes Plane Crash Survivors | Gonzalo Arijón | May 19, 2009 |
Subject: Uruguayan Air Force Flight 571
| 206 | 25 | Ask Not | Johnny Symons | June 19, 2009 |
Subject: Don't ask, don't tell
| 207 | 26 | Our Disappeared; Nuestros Desaparecidos | Juan Mandelbaum | September 21, 2009 |
Subject: Don't ask, don't tell

=== Season 11 (2009–10) ===
| No. overall | No. in season | Title | Directed by | Original release date |
|---|---|---|---|---|
| 208 | 1 | Herb & Dorothy | Megumi Sasaki | October 13, 2009 |
| 209 | 2 | Butte, Montana | Pamela Roberts | October 20, 2009 |
Subject: Butte, Montana
| 210 | 3 | Journals of a Wily School | Sudeshna Bose | October 27, 2009 |
| 211 | 4 | Power Paths | Bo Boudart | November 3, 2009 |
| 212 | 5 | D Tour | Jim Granato | November 10, 2009 |
| 213 | 6 | No Subtitles Necessary: Laszlo & Vilmos | James Chressanthis | November 17, 2009 |
| 214 | 7 | Objectified | Gary Hustwit | November 24, 2009 |
| 215 | 8 | Between the Folds | Vanessa Gould | December 8, 2009 |
Subject: Origami
| 216 | 9 | Scenes from a Parish | James Rutenbeck | December 29, 2009 |
Subject: Lawrence, Massachusetts
| 217 | 10 | Young@Heart | Stephen Walker | January 12, 2010 |
Subject: Young@Heart
| 218 | 11 | Copyright Criminals | Benjamin Franzen | January 19, 2010 |
Subject: Ramifications of music sampling in hip-hop
| 219 | 2 | P-Star Rising | Gabriel Noble | February 9, 2010 |
Subject: P-Star
| 220 | 13 | Herskovits at the Heart of Blackness | Llewellyn Smith | February 2, 2010 |
| 221 | 14 | Mine | Geralyn Pezanoski | February 16, 2010 |
| 222 | 15 | Behind the Rainbow | Jihan El Tahri | February 23, 2010 |
| 223 | 16 | The Eyes of Me | Keith Maitland | March 2, 2010 |
| 224 | 17 | Lost Souls (Animas Perdidas) | Monika Navarro | March 23, 2010 |
| 225 | 18 | Whatever It Takes | Christopher Wong | March 30, 2010 |
| 226 | 19 | Unmistaken Child | Nati Baratz | April 7, 2010 |
| 227 | 20 | Blessed Is the Match | Roberta Grossman | April 13, 2010 |
| 228 | 21 | Dirt! The Movie | Bill Benenson and Eugene Rosow | April 20, 2010 |
| 229 | 22 | Garbage Dreams | Mai Iskander | April 27, 2010 |
Subject: Zabbaleen
| 230 | 23 | Sunshine | Karen Skloss | May 4, 2010 |
| 231 | 24 | The Horse Boy | Michel Scott | May 11, 2010 |
| 232 | 25 | Project Kashmir | Senain Kheshgi and Geeta V. Patel | May 18, 2010 |
| 233 | 26 | A Village Called Versailles | Leo Chiang | May 25, 2010 |
| 234 | 27 | Goodbye Solo | Ramin Bahrani | June 1, 2010 |

=== Season 12 (2010–11) ===
| No. overall | No. in season | Title | Directed by | Original release date |
|---|---|---|---|---|
| 235 | 1 | The Parking Lot Movie | Meghan Eckman | October 19, 2010 |
Subject: Parking lot workers
| 236 | 2 | Art & Copy | Doug Pray | October 26, 2010 |
Subject: Advertising
| 237 | 3 | Reel Injun: On the Trail of the Hollywood Indian | Neil Diamond | November 2, 2010 |
Subject: Portrayal of Native Americans in Film
| 238 | 4 | The Longoria Affair | John J. Valadez | November 9, 2010 |
Subject: Felix Z. Longoria Jr.
| 239 | 5 | Lost Sparrow | Chris Billing | November 16, 2010 |
Subject: Child abuse
| 240 | 6 | Deep Down | Sally Rubin and Jen Gilomen | November 23, 2010 |
Subject: Mountaintop removal mining
| 241 | 7 | 45365 | Bill Ross and Turner Ross | December 14, 2010 |
Subject: Sidney, Ohio
| 242 | 8 | The Calling: Part 1 | Danny Alpert | December 20, 2010 |
Subject: Religion in the United States
| 243 | 9 | The Calling: Part 2 | Danny Alpert | December 21, 2010 |
Subject: Religion in the United States
| 244 | 10 | Men Who Swim | Dylan Williams | January 4, 2011 |
Subject: Synchronized swimming
| 245 | 11 | Children of Haiti | Alexandria Hammond | January 11, 2011 |
Subject: Orphans in Haiti
| 246 | 12 | For Once in My Life | Jim Bigham and Mark Moormann | February 1, 2011 |
Subject: Spirit of Goodwill Band and Disability
| 247 | 13 | When I Rise | Mat Hames | February 8, 2011 |
Subject: Barbara Smith Conrad and Desegregation
| 248 | 14 | William S. Burroughs: A Man Within | Yony Leyser | February 22, 2011 |
Subject: William S. Burroughs
| 249 | 15 | Me Facing Life: Cyntoia's Story | Daniel Birman | March 15, 2011 |
Subject: Juvenile delinquency, sexual abuse
| 250 | 16 | Pushing the Elephant | Beth Davenport and Elizabeth Mandel | March 29, 2011 |
Subject: Congolese American activist Rose Mapendo
| 251 | 17 | The Desert of Forbidden Art | Amanda Pope and Tchavdar Georgiev | April 5, 2011 |
Subject: Igor Savitsky
| 252 | 18 | Jean-Michel Basquiat: The Radiant Child | Tamra Davis | April 12, 2011 |
Subject: Jean-Michel Basquiat
| 253 | 19 | Waste Land | Lucy Walker | April 19, 2011 |
Subject: Vik Muniz land fill recycling "pickers"
| 254 | 20 | Marwencol | Jeff Malmberg | April 26, 2011 |
Subject: Mark Hogancamp / Outsider art
| 255 | 21 | A Film Unfinished | Yael Hersonski | May 3, 2011 |
Subject: History of a Nazi propaganda film on the Warsaw Ghetto
| 256 | 22 | Bhutto | Duane Baughman and Johnny O'Hara | May 10, 2011 |
Subject: Benazir Bhutto
| 257 | 23 | Beetle Queen Conquers Tokyo | Jessica Oreck | May 17, 2011 |
Subject: Insect aficionados in Japan
| 258 | 24 | Welcome to Shelbyville | Kim A. Snyder | May 24, 2011 |
Subject: Immigration to the United States
| 259 | 25 | Two Spirits | Lydia Nibley | June 14, 2011 |
Subject: Two-Spirit people

=== Season 13 (2011–12) ===
| No. overall | No. in season | Title | Directed by | Original release date |
|---|---|---|---|---|
| 260 | 1 | Wham! Bam! Islam! | Isaac Solotaroff | October 13, 2011 |
Subject: The 99
| 261 | 2 | Donor Unknown | Jerry Rothwell | October 20, 2011 |
Subject: Donor conceived person
| 262 | 3 | Lives Worth Living | Eric Neudel | October 27, 2011 |
Subject: Disability rights movement
| 263 | 4 | Deaf Jam | Judy Lieff | November 3, 2011 |
Subject: Deaf Poetry slam
| 264 | 5 | We Still Live Here - Âs Nutayuneân | Anne Makepeace | November 17, 2011 |
Subject: Saving the language of the Wampanoag people
| 265 | 6 | The Woodmans | C. Scott Willis | December 22, 2011 |
Subject: Francesca Woodman
| 266 | 7 | These Amazing Shadows | Paul Mariano and Kurt Norton | December 29, 2011 |
Subject: National Film Registry
| 267 | 8 | Have You Heard From Johannesburg? - Episode 1: The Road to Resistance | Connie Field | January 12, 2012 |
Subject: South Africa under apartheid
| 268 | 9 | Have You Heard From Johannesburg? - Episode 2: The New Generation | Connie Field | January 12, 2012 |
Subject: South Africa under apartheid
| 269 | 10 | Have You Heard From Johannesburg? - Episode 3: From Selma to Soweto | Connie Field | January 19, 2012 |
Subject: South Africa under apartheid
| 270 | 11 | Have You Heard From Johannesburg? - Episode 4: The Bottom Line | Connie Field | January 19, 2012 |
Subject: South Africa under apartheid
| 271 | 12 | Have You Heard From Johannesburg? - Episode 5: Free at Last | Connie Field | January 26, 2012 |
Subject: South Africa under apartheid
| 272 | 13 | Daisy Bates: First Lady of Little Rock | Sharon La Cruise | February 2, 2012 |
Subject: Daisy Bates (civil rights activist)
| 273 | 14 | Black Power Mixtape 1967-1975 | Goran Hugo Olsson | February 9, 2012 |
Subject: Black Power movement
| 274 | 15 | More Than a Month | Shukree Hassan Tilghman | February 16, 2012 |
Subject: Black History Month
| 275 | 16 | You're Looking at Me Like I Live Here and I Don't | Scott Kirschenbaum | March 29, 2012 |
Subject: Living with Alzheimer's disease
| 276 | 17 | Being Elmo: A Puppeteer's Journey | Constance Marks | April 5, 2012 |
Subject: Kevin Clash and Elmo
| 277 | 18 | When the Drum is Beating | Whitney Dow | April 12, 2012 |
Subject: Septentrional and the Music of Haiti
| 278 | 19 | Revenge of the Electric Car | Chris Paine | April 19, 2012 |
Subject: The re-emergence of the Electric car
| 279 | 20 | Facing the Storm: Story of the American Bison | Doug Hawes-Davis | April 26, 2012 |
Subject: American bison
| 280 | 21 | Circo | Aaron Schock | May 3, 2012 |
Subject: Mexican Circus family
| 281 | 22 | Summer Pasture | Lynn True, Nelson Walker, Tsering Perlo | May 10, 2012 |
Subject: Nomads in Eastern Tibet
| 282 | 23 | Precious Knowledge | Ari Luis Palos | May 17, 2012 |
Subject: Controversy over Ethnic studies in Arizona
| 283 | 25 | Left by the Ship | Emma Rossi Landi and Alberto Vendemmiati | May 24, 2012 |
Subject: Amerasian children in the Philippines
| 284 | 24 | Hell and Back Again | Danfung Dennis | May 28, 2012 |
Subject: Sgt. Nathan Harris, veteran of the War in Afghanistan (2001–present)
| 285 | 26 | We Were Here | David Weissman | June 14, 2012 |
Subject: The AIDS crisis in San Francisco
| 286 | 27 | Strong! | Julie Wyman | July 26, 2012 |
Subject: Former U.S. Olympic weightlifting team member Cheryl Haworth

=== Season 14 (2012–13) ===
"Half the Sky: Turning Oppression Into Opportunity for Women Worldwide" was a special co-presentation between Independent Lens and Show of Force.
Episode 1410 "Kind Hearted Woman" is a co-presentation with the PBS series Frontline.

| No. in season | Title | Directed by | Original release date |
|---|---|---|---|
| -- | Half the Sky: Turning Oppression Into Opportunity for Women Worldwide | Maro Chermayeff, Jamie Gordon, and Mikaela Beardsley | October 1, 2012 |
Subject: Half the Sky movement and Women's rights
| 1 | As Goes Janesville | Brad Lichtenstein | October 8, 2012 |
Subject: Controversy over 2011 Wisconsin Act 10 and effects of the Great Recession in Janesville, Wisconsin
| 2 | Love Free or Die | Macky Alston | October 29, 2012 |
Subject: Gene Robinson and Homosexuality and Anglicanism
| 3 | Solar Mamas | Jehane Noujaim and Mona Eldaief | November 5, 2012 |
Subject: Barefoot College and Women's rights
| 4 | Park Avenue: Money, Power & the American Dream | Alex Gibney | November 12, 2012 |
Subject: Wealth inequality in the United States and power
| 5 | Soul Food Junkies | Byron Hurt | January 14, 2013 |
Subject: Soul food and Obesity in the United States
| 6 | Beauty is Embarrassing | Neil Berkeley | January 21, 2013 |
Subject: Wayne White (artist)
| 7 | The Revisionaries | Scott Thurman | January 28, 2013 |
Subject: Texas Education Agency and Intelligent design in politics
| 8 | The Powerbroker: Whitney Young's Fight for Civil Rights | Bonnie Boswell, Christine Khalafian, and Taylor Hamilton | February 18, 2013 |
Subject: Whitney Young
| 9 | Ai Weiwei: Never Sorry | Alison Klayman | February 25, 2013 |
Subject: Ai Weiwei
| 10 | Kind Hearted Woman | David R. Sutherland | April 1, 2013 |
Subject: Domestic violence in Oglala Lakota community.
| 11 | The House I Live In | Eugene Jarecki | April 8, 2013 |
Subject: America's war on drugs
| 12 | Wonder Women! The Untold Story of American Superheroines | Kristy Guevara-Flanagan | April 15, 2013 |
Subject: History of Wonder Woman and other female super heroes.
| 13 | The Island President | Jon Shenk | April 22, 2013 |
Subject: Mohamed Nasheed and Climate change
| 14 | The Undocumented | Marco Williams | April 29, 2013 |
Subject: Illegal immigration to the United States
| 15 | Seeking Asian Female | Debbie Lum | May 6, 2013 |
Subject: Asian fetish and Mail-order bride
| 16 | The Invisible War | Kirby Dick | May 13, 2013 |
Subject: Sexual assault in the United States military
| 17 | Detropia | Heidi Ewing and Rachel Grady | May 27, 2013 |
Subject: Detroit and Urban decay
| 18 | The Revolutionary Optimists | Nicole Newnham and Maren Grainger-Monsen | June 17, 2013 |
Subject: Children working to alleviate effects of Poverty in India

=== Season 15 (2013–14) ===
| No. in season | Title | Directed by | Original release date |
|---|---|---|---|
| 1 | Don't Stop Believin': Everyman's Journey | Ramona S. Diaz | September 30, 2013 |
Subject: How Arnel Pineda became lead singer of Journey
| 2 | The Waiting Room | Pete Nicks | October 21, 2013 |
Subject: Health care in the United States and Highland Hospital (Oakland, California)
| 3 | The Graduates/Los Graduados | Bernardo Ruiz | October 28, 2013 |
Subject: Latinos and high school
| 4 | Indian Relay | Charles Dye | November 18, 2013 |
Subject: Native Americans in the United States and horse racing
| 5 | Young Lakota | Marion Lipschutz and Rose Rosenblatt | November 25, 2013 |
Subject: Cecilia Fire Thunder and controversy over Planned Parenthood on the Pine Ridge Indian Reservation
| 6 | Playwright: From Page to Stage | Robert Levi | December 16, 2013 |
Subject: Playwrights Tarell Alvin McCraney and Rajiv Joseph
| 7 | Jiro Dreams of Sushi | David Gelb | December 23, 2013 |
Subject: Sushi master chef Sukiyabashi Jiro
| 8 | How to Survive a Plague | David France (writer) | December 30, 2013 |
Subject: AIDS epidemic and grassroots activists ACT UP and TAG
| 9 | At Berkeley | Frederick Wiseman | January 13, 2014 |
Subject: University of California, Berkeley
| 10 | Blood Brother | Steve Hoover | January 20, 2014 |
Subject: AIDS orphans in India.
| 11 | The State of Arizona | Carlos Sandoval and Catherine Tambini | January 27, 2014 |
Subject: Arizona SB 1070 and the debate over immigration in Arizona
| 12 | Spies of Mississippi | Dawn Porter | February 10, 2014 |
Subject: Mississippi State Sovereignty Commission and Civil rights movement
| 13 | Las Marthas | Cristina Ibarra | February 17, 2014 |
Subject: The Laredo, Texas Society of Martha Washington Debutante ball
| 14 | All of Me | Alexandra Lescaze | March 24, 2014 |
Subject: Women who met via National Association to Advance Fat Acceptance
| 15 | Medora | Andrew Cohn and Davy Rothbart | March 31, 2014 |
Subject: High school basketball team in Medora, Indiana
| 16 | Brothers Hypnotic | Reuben Atlas | April 7, 2014 |
Subject: The Hypnotic Brass Ensemble and Phil Cohran
| 17 | The Trials of Muhammad Ali | Bill Siegel | April 14, 2014 |
Subject: Muhammad Ali's refusal to serve in Vietnam War and subsequent ban from boxing
| 18 | Muscle Shoals | Greg Camalier | April 21, 2014 |
Subject: The famous Muscle Shoals, Alabama music studios FAME Studios and Muscle Shoals Sound Studio
| 19 | A Fragile Trust: Plagiarism, Power, and Jayson Blair at The New York Times | Samantha Grant | May 5, 2014 |
Subject: Jayson Blair, The New York Times, and plagiarism
| 20 | Let the Fire Burn | Jason Osder | May 12, 2014 |
Subject: 1985 standoff between MOVE and Philadelphia Police Department
| 21 | God Loves Uganda | Roger Ross Williams | May 19, 2014 |
Subject: International House of Prayer's efforts to spread Christianity and promote Uganda Anti-Homosexuality Bill
| 22 | The New Black | Yoruba Richen | June 16, 2014 |
Subject: African American divide on Same-sex marriage in Maryland and Maryland Question 6

=== Season 16 (2014–15) ===
| No. in season | Title | Directed by | Original release date |
|---|---|---|---|
| 1 | Bully | Lee Hirsch | October 13, 2014 |
Subject: Bullying in United States schools
| 2 | Twin Sisters | Mona Friis Bertheussen | October 20, 2014 |
Subject: Twins adoption from China to the United States and Norway
| 3 | Brakeless | Kyoko Miyake | October 27, 2014 |
Subject: Amagasaki rail crash in Japan
| 4 | Powerless | Fahad Mustafa and Deepti Kakkar | November 3, 2014 |
Subject: Kanpur, India and Electricity sector in India
| 5 | Happiness | Thomas Balmès | November 17, 2014 |
Subject: When television and internet came to Bhutan
| 6 | Rich Hill | Andrew Droz Palermo and Tracy Droz Tragos | January 5, 2015 |
Subject: Challenges, hopes, and dreams of three young residents of a rural, impoverished American town
| 7 | Evolution of a Criminal | Darius Clark Monroe | January 12, 2015 |
Subject: Filmmaker explores the Bank robbery he committed as a teenager
| 8 | The Kill Team | Dan Krauss | January 19, 2015 |
Subject: Maywand District murders during the War in Afghanistan
| 9 | A Path Appears | Maro Chermayeff | January 26, 2015 |
Subject: Sequel to the series based on Half the Sky, as Nicholas Kristof and Sheryl WuDunn track stories of women overcoming gender-based oppression, sexual violence and sex trafficking
| 10 | Through a Lens Darkly: Black Photographers and the Emergence of a People | Thomas Allen Harris | February 16, 2015 |
Subject: African American photography from American Civil War to present
| 11 | American Denial | Llewellyn Smith, Christine Herbes-Sommers, and Kelly Thomson | February 23, 2015 |
Subject: Gunnar Myrdal and unconscious racism in the United States of America
| 12 | Little White Lie | Lacey Schwartz Delgado | March 23, 2015 |
Subject: A Jewish filmmaker discovers she may also be African-American
| 13 | Little Hope Was Arson | Theo Love | April 6, 2015 |
Subject: 2010 East Texas church burnings
| 14 | The Homestretch | Anne de Mare and Kirsten Kelly | April 13, 2015 |
Subject: Homeless teenagers in Chicago
| 15 | The Great Invisible | Margaret Brown | April 20, 2015 |
Subject: BP oil spill in the Gulf in 2010 and its aftermath
| ? | After the Storm | ? | April 27, 2015 |
Subject: "tells the story of what happens in the wake of a devastating tornado that ripped through central Alabama in 2011"
| 16 | Kumu Hina | Dean Hamer and Joe Wilson | May 4, 2015 |
Subject: Transgender Hawaiian teacher
| 17 | Born to Fly: Elizabeth Streb vs. Gravity | Catherine Gund | May 11, 2015 |
Subject: Choreographer Elizabeth Streb
| 18 | 1971 | Johanna Hamilton | May 18, 2015 |
Subject: Citizens' Commission to Investigate the FBI, FBI and COINTELPRO
| 19 | Limited Partnership | Thomas G. Miller and Kirk Marcolina | June 15, 2015 |
Subject: On one of the first Same-sex marriages, a couple then denied legal status by Immigration and Naturalization Service
| ? | In the Shadow of Ebola | Sarita Siegel and Gregg Mitman | June 22, 2015 |
Subject:

=== Season 17 (2015–16) ===
| No. in season | Title | Directed by | Original release date |
|---|---|---|---|
| ? | Immigration Battle | Shari Robertson and Michael Camerini | October 20, 2015 |
| 1 | Stray Dog | Debra Granik | November 9, 2015 |
| 2 | India's Daughter | Leslee Udwin | November 16, 2015 |
| 3 | Mimi and Dona | Sophie Sartain | November 23, 2015 |
| 4 | East of Salinas | Laura Pacheco and Jackie Mow | December 28, 2015 |
| 5 | Chuck Norris vs Communism | Ilinca Calugareanu | January 4, 2016 |
| 6 | Autism in Love | Matt Fuller | January 11, 2016 |
| 7 | In Football We Trust | Tony Vainuku and Erika Cohn | January 25, 2016 |
| 8 | No Más Bebés (No More Babies) | Renee Tajima-Peña | February 1, 2016 |
| 9 | A Ballerina's Tale | Nelson George | February 8, 2016 |
| 10 | The Black Panthers: Vanguard of the Revolution | Stanley Nelson | February 16, 2016 |
| 11 | (T)ERROR | Lyric R. Cabral and David Felix Sutcliffe | February 22, 2016 |
| 12 | Wilhemina's War | June Cross | February 29, 2016 |
| 13 | An Honest Liar | Tyler Measom and Justin Weinstein | March 28, 2016 |
| 14 | Welcome to Leith | Michael Beach Nichols and Christopher K. Walker | April 4, 2016 |
| 15 | Democrats | Camilla Nielsson | April 18, 2016 |
| 16 | My Nazi Legacy | David Evans | May 2, 2016 |
| 17 | Peace Officer | Brad Barber and Scott Christopherson | May 9, 2016 |
| 18 | The Armor of Light | Abigail Disney | May 10, 2016 |
| 19 | Dogtown Redemption | Amir Soltani and Chihiro Wimbush | May 16, 2016 |
| 20 | Trapped | Dawn Porter | June 2016 |
| 21 | T-Rex: Her Fight for Gold | Drea Cooper and Zackary Canepari | August 2, 2016 |

=== Season 18 (2016–17) ===
| No. in season | Title | Directed by | Original release date |
|---|---|---|---|
| 1 | Best of Enemies | Robert Gordon and Morgan Neville | October 3, 2016 |
| 2 | Meet the Patels | Ravi Patel and Geeta Patel | December 26, 2016 |
| 3 | Best and Most Beautiful Things | Garrett Zevgetis | January 2, 2017 |
| 4 | Containment | Robb Moss and Peter Galison | January 9, 2017 |
| 5 | What Was Ours | Mat Hames | January 16, 2017 |
| 6 | The Witness | James Solomon | January 23, 2017 |
| 7 | Birth of a Movement | Susan Gray and Bestor Cram | February 6, 2017 |
| 8 | Accidental Courtesy | Matt Ornstein | February 13, 2017 |
| 9 | TOWER | Keith Maitland | February 14, 2017 |
| 10 | The Bad Kids | Lou Pepe and Keith Fulton | March 20, 2017 |
| 11 | Ovarian Psycos | Kate Trumbull-LaValle and Joanna Sokolowski | March 27, 2017 |
| 12 | Newtown | Kim A. Snyder | April 3, 2017 |
| 13 | SEED: The Untold Story | Jon Betz and Taggart Siegel | April 17, 2017 |
| 14 | The Last Laugh | Ferne Pearlstein | April 24, 2017 |
| 15 | National Bird | Sonia Kennebeck | May 1, 2017 |
| 16 | The Prison in Twelve Landscapes | Brett Story | May 8, 2017 |
| 17 | Forever Pure | Maya Zinshtein | May 15, 2017 |
| 18 | They Call Us Monsters | Ben Lear | May 22, 2017 |
| 19 | Farmer/Veteran | D.L. Anderson, Alexandra Blair and Jeremy Lange | May 29, 2017 |
| 20 | Real Boy | Shaleece Haas and Charlotte Lagarde | June 19, 2017 |

=== Season 19 (2017–18) ===
| No. in season | Title | Directed by | Original release date |
|---|---|---|---|
| 1 | Chasing Trane: The John Coltrane Documentary | John Scheinfeld | November 6, 2017 |
The great saxophonist John Coltrane, the man and the musical artist.
| 2 | Shadow World | Johan Grimonprez | November 20, 2017 |
The billion-dollar global arms trade.
| 3 | Supergirl | Jessie Auritt | December 18, 2017 |
The story of Naomi Kutin, an ordinary Orthodox Jewish pre-teen with extraordinary powerlifting talent.
| 4 | The Untold Tales of Armistead Maupin | Jennifer Kroot | January 1, 2018 |
The story of writer Armistead Maupin, whose Tales of the City series inspired millions to claim their own truth.
| 5 | Unrest | Jennifer Brea | January 8, 2018 |
Filmmaker Jennifer Brea's struggle with Chronic Fatigue Syndrome.
| 6 | I Am Not Your Negro | Raoul Peck | January 15, 2018 |
The book James Baldwin never finished is envisioned to examine race in America then and now.
| 7 | The Force | Peter Nicks | January 22, 2018 |
Inside the long-troubled Oakland Police Department as it struggles with demands for reform during tumultuous times.
| 8 | I Am Another You | Nanfu Wang | January 29, 2018 |
A charismatic young homeless drifter who left a comfortable home life for a life on the road.
| 9 | Winnie | Pascale Lamche | February 5, 2018 |
The overshadowed life of Winnie Mandela and her contributions to bring down apartheid from the inside.
| 10 | Tell Them We Are Rising | Stanley Nelson Jr. and Marco Williams | February 19, 2018 |
The pivotal role historically black colleges and universities (HBCUs) have played over the course of 150 years in American history, culture, and identity.
| 11 | Rat Film | Theo Anthony | February 26, 2018 |
The history of Baltimore via the rat and the city's connection between infestations and economic inequity.
| 12 | Dolores | Peter Bratt | March 27, 2018 |
Activist icon Dolores Huerta, who led the fight for racial and labor justice.
| 13 | When God Sleeps | Till Schauder | April 2, 2018 |
A rap-punk-rock documentary about Iranian musician Shahin Najafi, who is forced into hiding after hardline clerics issue a fatwa for his death.
| 14 | The Art of the Shine | Stacey Tenenbaum | April 9, 2018 |
An intimate look at the people around the world who restore dignity and delight to a forgotten profession.
| 15 | What Lies Upstream | Cullen Hoback | April 16, 2018 |
The 2014 Elk River chemical spill (the unprecedented loss of clean water for over 300,000 people in West Virginia).
| 16 | Look & See: Wendell Berry's Kentucky | Laura Dunn | April 23, 2018 |
Rural America in the era of industrial agriculture, through the eyes of beloved poet and farmer Wendell Berry.
| 17 | True Conviction | Jamie Meltzer | April 30, 2018 |
After a combined 60 years in prison before exoneration, 3 Texans form a detective agency to free other innocent people.
| 18 | No Man's Land | David Byars | May 7, 2018 |
The 2016 standoff between protesters in Oregon's Malheur Refuge and federal authorities.
| 19 | ACORN and the Firestorm | Reuben Atlas and Sam Pollard | May 21, 2018 |
A sting to bring down community organizers sets off media frenzy affecting real people on all sides of political divide.
| 20 | Served Like a Girl | Lysa Heslov | May 28, 2018 |
A group of women veterans as they transition from active US military duty to civilian life with its challenges, and their participation in the "Ms. Veteran America" competition.

=== Season 20 (2018–19) ===
| No. in season | Title | Directed by | Original release date |
|---|---|---|---|
| 1 | "Wildland" | Alex Jablonski and Kahlil Hudson | October 29, 2018 |
A firefighting crew training to battle nature's most extraordinary force.
| 2 | "Dawnland" | Adam Mazo and Ben Pender-Cudlip | November 5, 2018 |
An untold story of indigenous child removal, the stakes of family separation policy are no less than cultural survival.
| 3 | "The Cleaners" | Moritz Riesewieck and Hans Block | November 12, 2018 |
The shadow industry of "content moderators", hired by Silicon Valley leaders to control what we see online. (Duration: 86 min.)
| 4 | "The Judge" | Erika Cohn | November 19, 2018 |
The story of the first-ever female judge in Palestine's religious courts who overcame a male-dominated tradition to change minds. (Duration: 81 min.)
| 5 | "Man on Fire" | Joel Fendelman | December 17, 2018 |
A community deals with the aftermath of a shocking public suicide.
| 6 | "My Country No More" | Rita Baghdadi and Jeremiah Hammerling | January 7, 2019 |
The human cost of the oil boom seen through the intimate lens of a family fighting for their agricultural way of life.
| 7 | "Rodents of Unusual Size" | Quinn Costello, Chris Metzler and Jeff Springer | January 14, 2019 |
The story of the introduction of nutria (20-pound rodents) to Louisiana and the creative efforts being used in the attempts to eradicate them.
| 8 | "RUMBLE: The Indians Who Rocked the World" | Catherine Bainbridge and Alfonso Maiorana | January 21, 2019 |
The electric story of how Native American influence shaped rock and roll, a missing chapter in music history. (Duration: 86 min.)
| 9A | "The King" | Eugene Jarecki | January 28, 2019 |
Climb into Elvis's 1963 Rolls-Royce for a musical road trip and meditation on modern America. (Duration: 107 min.)
| 9B | "Accident, MD" (short) | Dan Rybicky | January 28, 2019 |
A short documentary about America's healthcare crisis as seen in the town of Accident, Maryland during the summer before the 2016 election. (Duration: 8 min.)
| 10 | "Black Memorabilia" | Chico Colvard | February 4, 2019 |
A look at those who reproduce, consume and reclaim racially-charged memorabilia.
| 11 | "Won't You Be My Neighbor?" | Morgan Neville | February 9, 2019 |
An intimate look at America's favorite neighbor: Mister Rogers.
| 12A | "Hale County This Morning, This Evening" | RaMell Ross | February 11, 2019 |
A journey through the world of Hale County, Alabama, an intimate glimpse into the southern black experience. (Nominated for an Academy Award; Timeslot: 90 min.)
| 12B | "While I Yet Live" (short) | Maris Curran | February 11, 2019 |
A short documentary about five acclaimed quilters from Gee's Bend, Alabama as they are quilting and talk about love, religion and their fight for civil rights.
| 13 | "People's Republic of Desire" | Hao Wu | February 25, 2019 |
The stunning but lonely world of Chinese live-streaming "showrooms". (Timeslot: 90 min.)
| 14 | "Tre Maison Dasan" | Denali Tiller | April 1, 2019 |
Life with a parent in prison through eyes of their children. (Timeslot: 90 min.)
| 15 | "The Providers" | Laura Green & Anna Moot-Levin | April 8, 2019 |
Three rural healthcare providers try to make a difference in the lives of their patients against overwhelming odds. (Timeslot: 90 min.)
| 16 | "Marcos Doesn't Live Here Anymore" | David Sutherland | April 15, 2019 |
This documentary examines the US immigration system through the eyes of a couple (a decorated US Marine veteran and her undocumented husband) separated by deportation. (A special presentation of Independent Lens, FRONTLINE and VOCES; Timeslot: 120 min.)
| 17 | "Charm City" | Marilyn Ness | April 22, 2019 |
Meet the people working to stem the tide of violence in Baltimore, in Marilyn Ness's acclaimed documentary. (Timeslot: 90 min.)
| 18 | "Out of State" | Ciara Lacy | May 6, 2019 |
Follows the journeys of native Hawaiians in a prison thousands of miles from home.
| 19 | "Harvest Season" | Bernardo Ruiz | May 13, 2019 |
Documentary spotlights California's Latino winemakers and the migrant workers behind every bottle. (Timeslot: 90 min.)
| 20 | "Wrestle" | Suzannah Herbert & Lauren Belfer | May 20, 2019 |
An intimate and inspiring portrait of an Alabama high school wrestling team as they face challenges on and off the mat. (Timeslot: 90 min.)

=== Season 21 (2019–20) ===
| Prod. code | No. in season | Title | Directed by | Original airdate |
|---|---|---|---|---|
| 2101 | 1 | "Made in Boise" | Beth Aala | October 29, 2019 |
Four surrogates carry children for intended parents, developing bonds like no other. (Timeslot: 90 min.)
| 2102 | 2 | "Decade of Fire" | Vivian Vázquez Irizarry and Gretchen Hildebran | November 4, 2019 |
Discover why the Bronx burned in the 1970s displacing a quarter-million residents and meet those who chose to resist, remain and rebuild.
| 2103 | 3 | "The Interpreters" | Andrés Caballero and Sofian Khan | November 11, 2019 |
Meet local interpreters who helped US troops in Iraq and Afghanistan, now in danger themselves.
| 2104 | 4A | "Conscience Point" | Treva Wurmfeld | November 18, 2019 |
Development in the Hamptons of Long Island, including mega-mansions and the Shinnecock Hills Golf Club built atop a sacred burial ground, triggers a woman's relentless fight to protect her tribe, the Shinnecock Indian Nation, from the onslaughts of development. (Duration: 74 min.)
| - | 4B | "Jewel's Hunt" (short) | Alexandra Stergiou | November 18, 2019 |
Sixteen-year-old high school student Jewel Wilson explores what it means to come of age as an Inupiat subsistence hunter in Unalakleet, Alaska. (Timeslot: 15 min.)
| 2105 | 5 | "Attla" | Catharine Axley | December 16, 2019 |
The inspiring true story of the one-good-legged legendary Alaska Native dogsled champion George Attla is woven with his coming out of retirement to train his twenty-year-old grandnephew, Joe Bifelt, to compete in one of the world's largest dogsled sprint races.
| 2106 | 6 | "A Day in the Life of America" | Jared Leto | January 11, 2020 |
Shot over the course of 2017 Independence Day, the film depicts glimpses into the diversity and division of the United States.
| 2107 | 7 | "The First Rainbow Coalition" | Ray Santisteban | January 27, 2020 |
The Chicago Black Panther Party, the Latino group Young Lords Organization, and the Young Patriots Organization band together to confront issues such as police brutality and substandard housing.
| 2108 | 8 | "Cooked: Survival by Zip Code" | Judith Helfand | February 3, 2020 |
The July 1995 heat wave in Chicago claimed 739 lives in a single week, and became the most traumatic heat wave in U.S. history.
| 2109 | 9 | "Leftover Women" | shosh Shlam and Hilla Medalia | February 10, 2020 |
Three modern women search for Mr. Right before Chinese society deems them 'leftover' for putting jobs ahead of marriage.
| 2110 | 10 | "We Believe in Dinosaurs" | Monica Long Ross and Clayton Brown | February 17, 2020 |
The Bible and science collide over a Kentucky creationism museum and a $120 million Noah's Ark-inspired theme park.
| 2111 | 11 | "Always in Season" | Jacqueline Olive | February 24, 2020 |
The suspicious death of Lennon Lacy and a mother's quest for truth.
| 2112 | 12 | "One Child Nation" | Nanfu Wang and Jialing Zhang | March 30, 2020 |
Explores the devastating impacts of China's one-child policy.
| 2113 | 13 | "Bedlam" | Kenneth Paul Rosenberg, M.D. | April 13, 2020 |
Examines the mental health crisis through intimate stories of people in-and-out of ERs, jails and homeless camps.
| 2114 | 14 | "The Hottest August" | Brett Story | April 20, 2020 |
Raises the specter of our changing climate with interviews from ordinary New Yorkers sharing their anxieties about the future.
| 2115 | 15 | "Jim Allison: Breakthrough" | Bill Haney | April 27, 2020 |
Nobel Prize-winning immunologist James P. Allison went from small-town Texas to taking on the medical establishment.
| 2116 | 16 | "Rewind" | Sasha Joseph Neulinger | May 11, 2020 |
A vivid but ultimately hopeful portrait of a family plagued by a vicious cycle of abuse.
| 2117 | 17 | "Eating Up Easter" | Sergio M. Rapu | May 25, 2020 |
Rapa Nui is facing increasing challenges to preserve its culture and environment from tourism and modern society.
| 2118 | 18 | "Recorder: The Marion Stokes Project" | Matt Wolf | June 15, 2020 |
Radical activist-turned-recluse Marion Stokes videotaped everything on TV for thirty years in the name of truth.
| 2119 | 19 | "Pipe Dreams" | Stacey Tenenbaum | June 22, 2020 |
A new generation of talented young musicians compete in the world's most prestigious pipe organ competition.

=== Season 22 (2020–21) ===
| Prod. code | No. in season | Title | Directed by | Original airdate |
|---|---|---|---|---|
| 2201 | 1 | "Feels Good Man" | Arthur Jones | October 19, 2020 |
Chronicles the surreal story of Pepe the Frog's journey from laid-back cartoon character to registered hate symbol.
| 2202 | 2 | "Represent" | Hillary Bachelder | October 26, 2020 |
Leading up to the 2018 midterm elections, three midwestern women tackle politics on their own terms.
| 2203 | 3 | "Jonathan Scott's Power Trip" | Jonathan Scott (television personality) | November 16, 2020 |
Property Brothers' Jonathan Scott journeys across the U.S. to uncover why solar energy isn't available to all.
| 2204 | 4 | "Belly of the Beast" | Erika Cohn | November 23, 2020 |
Two women investigate a pattern of illegal sterilizations in women's prisons and battle the Department of Corrections.
| 2205 | 5 | "A Woman's Work: The NFL's Cheerleader Problem" | Yu Gu | January 4, 2021 |
Two brave cheerleaders battle the massive, male-dominated sports league the NFL for recognition, and a raise.
| 2206 | 6 | "A Day in the Life of America" | Jared Leto | January 11, 2021 |
Shot over the course of 2017 Independence Day, the film depicts glimpses into the diversity and division of the United States.
| 2207 | 7 | "9to5: The Story of a Movement" | Julia Reichert and Steven Bognar | February 1, 2021 |
Captures the real-life fight that inspired a hit and changed the American workplace.
| 2208 | 8 | "Women in Blue" | Deirdre Fishel | February 8, 2021 |
Female officers in the Minneapolis Police Department fight for gender equity and police reform from the inside.
| 2209 | 9 | "Mr. SOUL!" | Melissa Haizlip | February 22, 2021 |
Explores the first nationally broadcast all-Black variety show on public television, Ellis Haizlip's SOUL!
| 2210 | 10 | "Coded Bias" | Shalini Kantayya | March 22, 2021 |
Exposes prejudices and threats to civil liberty in facial recognition algorithms and artificial intelligence.
| 2211 | 11 | "Down a Dark Stairwell" | Ursula Liang | April 12, 2021 |
A Chinese American cop's (Peter Liang) killing of Akai Gurley, an innocent Black man, sets two marginalized communities to seek racial justice.
| 2212 | 12 | "Philly D.A." | Ted Passon, Yoni Brook and Nicole Salazar | April 20, 2021 |
Eight-part inside look at the tumultuous first term of Philadelphia's unapologetic progressive District Attorney, Larry Krasner.
| 2213 | 13 | "The Donut King" | Alice Gu | May 21, 2021 |
Meet the Donut King, Ted Ngoy, the Cambodian refugee who built a multi-million-dollar empire baking America's favorite pastry.
| 2214 | 14 | "Two Gods" | Zeshawn Ali and Aman Ali | June 21, 2021 |
Portrait of community, faith, and healing through the eyes of a Muslim casket maker and his mentees.
| 2215 | 15 | "The People vs. Agent Orange" | Alan Adelson and Kate Taverna | June 28, 2021 |
Two women, one American and one Vietnamese, fight to hold the chemical industry accountable for a devastating legacy.

=== Season 23 (2021–22) ===
| Prod. code | No. in season | Title | Directed by | Original airdate |
|---|---|---|---|---|
| 2301 | 1 | "Cured" | Patrick Sammon and Bennett Singer | October 11, 2021 |
When homosexuality was considered a mental illness to be "cured", LGBTQ+ activists fought back.
| 2302 | 2 | "Ferguson Rises" | Mobolaji Olambiwonnu | November 8, 2021 |
Michael Brown Sr. seeks justice after a white police officer kills his son in Ferguson.
| 2303 | 3 | "Storm Lake" | Jerry Risius and Beth Levison | November 15, 2021 |
Inside the family-run newspaper keeping local journalism alive.
| 2304 | 4 | "Duty Free" | Sian-Pierre Regis | November 22, 2021 |
Fired from a lifelong job, a 75-year-old mom teams up with her son to reclaim her future through bucket list adventures.
| 2305 | 5 | "Home From School: The Children of Carlisle" | Geoffrey O'Gara | November 23, 2021 |
130 years after Native American boys died at an Indian boarding school, their tribe tries to bring them home.
| 2306 | 6 | "A Reckoning in Boston" | James Rutenbeck | January 17, 2022 |
A white filmmaker collaborates with Clemente Course students of color to reckon with Boston's racial history.
| 2307 | 7 | "Missing in Brooks County" | Lisa Molomot and Jeff Bemiss | January 31, 2022 |
The deadliest part of a migrant's journey is just beyond the border. For those missing, one man offers a last hope.
| 2308 | 8 | "Owned: A Tale of Two Americas" | Giorgio Angelini | February 7, 2022 |
Exposé on how the American housing policy market has been manipulated for years in discriminatory ways.
| 2309 | 9 | "Bulletproof" | Todd Chandler | February 14, 2022 |
In an era of mass shootings, take a provocative look at what Americans will do to feel safe in schools.
| 2310 | 10 | "Apart" | Jennifer Redfearn | February 21, 2022 |
In a country leading the world in incarcerating women, three mothers fight to rebuild their lives.
| 2311 | 11 | "Writing with Fire" | Rintu Thomas and Sushmit Ghosh | March 28, 2022 |
Meet the fearless women journalists of India's only all-female newspaper. It was the first Indian film nominated for an Academy Award for Best Documentary Feature Film.
| 2312 | 12 | "AWARE: Glimpses of Consciousness" | Frauke Sandig and Eric Black | April 25, 2022 |
Brilliant researchers go on a journey to investigate the mysteries of consciousness.
| 2313 | 13 | "Try Harder!" | Debbie Lum | May 2, 2022 |
At San Francisco's academic pressure cooker Lowell High School, stressed-out seniors chase college dreams.
| 2314 | 14 | "When Claude Got Shot" | Brad Lichtenstein | May 9, 2022 |
After being shot in the face by a teenager, can law student Claude find it in himself to forgive his attacker?
| 2315 | 15 | "Scenes from the Glittering World" | Jared Jakins | May 16, 2022 |
On the Navajo Nation reservation, Indigenous teens at one of the most remote schools in America plan their futures.

=== Season 24 (2022–23) ===
| Prod. code | No. in season | Title | Directed by | Original airdate |
|---|---|---|---|---|
| 2401 | 1 | "Hazing" | Byron Hurt | September 12, 2022 |
Explores how abusive rituals reflect our desire to belong—even if taken to sometimes deadly lengths.
| 2402 | 2 | "TikTok, Boom." | Shalini Kantayya | October 24, 2022 |
Explores the power and complexity of technology through the lens of TikTok and the Gen Z influencers who know it best.
| 2403 | 3 | "Move Me" | Kelsey Peterson and Daniel Klein | November 7, 2022 |
A dancer paralyzed with a spinal cord injury tests the limits of her recovery while adapting to life with a disability.
| 2404 | 4 | "Children of Las Brisas" | Marianela Maldonado | January 2, 2023 |
In Venezuela, the power of music is put to the test for El Sistema youth orchestra.
| 2405 | 5 | "The Big Payback" | Erika Alexander and Whitney Dow | January 16, 2023 |
The passage of the first-ever tax-funded reparations bill for Black Americans stirs up a debate.
| 2406 | 6 | "No Straight Lines" | Vivian Kleiman | January 23, 2023 |
Five queer comic book artists journey from the underground comix scene to mainstream acceptance.
| 2407 | 7 | "The Picture Taker" | Phil Bertelsen | January 30, 2023 |
The vibrant life of Ernest Withers—civil rights photographer, and FBI informant—was anything but black and white.
| 2408 | 8 | "Outta the Muck" | Ira McKinley and Bhawin Suchak | February 7, 2022 |
The people of Pahokee, Florida rise "outta the muck" to celebrate family history and big-time football.
| 2409 | 9 | "Love in the Time of Fentanyl" | Colin Askey | February 13, 2023 |
A supervised drug consumption site gives hope to a marginalized community ravaged by the overdose crisis.
| 2410 | 10 | "Storming Caesars Palace" | Hazel Gurland-Pooler | March 20, 2023 |
How Vegas activist Ruby Duncan's grassroots movement of moms fought for basic income guarantee.
| 2411 | 11 | "Hidden Letters" | Violet Du Feng and Zhao Qing | March 27, 2023 |
Modern women in China keep alive the tradition of Nüshu, a secret written language.
| 2412 | 12 | "Free Chol Soo Lee" | Julie Ha and Eugene Yi | April 24, 2023 |
The rollercoaster life story of Chol Soo Lee, a Korean immigrant wrongfully convicted of murder.
| 2413 | 13 | "Matter of Mind: My ALS" | Anna Moot-Levin and Laura Green | May 1, 2023 |
Three people with ALS confront complex choices in this intimate exploration.
| 2414 | 14 | "Sam Now" | Reed Harkness | May 8, 2023 |
Coming-of-age documentary about generational trauma follows Sam Harkness from age 11 to 36 as his middle-class Seattle family is heartbroken and unsure of what to do after his mother suddenly leaves them.
| 2415 | 15 | "Silent Beauty" | Jasmín Mara López | May 15, 2023 |
One woman's journey to heal from childhood sexual abuse evolves into a family bonding over generational trauma.
| 2416 | 16 | "Mama Bears (film)" | Daresha Kyi | June 20, 2023 |
Conservative, Christian beliefs have defined their lives. Now they're championing their LGBTQ+ children.

=== Season 25 (2023–24) ===
| Prod. code | No. in season | Title | Directed by | Original airdate |
|---|---|---|---|---|
| 2501 | 1 | "Sansón and Me" | Rodrigo Reyes | September 19, 2023 |
The life story of an incarcerated young man, told through dramatic reenactments.
| 2502 | 2 | "El Equipo" | Bernardo Ruiz | October 9, 2023 |
An unlikely collaboration changes the course of forensic science and international human rights.
| 2503 | 3 | "Three Chaplains" | David Washburn | November 7, 2023 |
Muslim chaplains work for change inside the U.S. military, fighting for equality and religious freedom.
| 2504 | 4 | "A Town Called Victoria" | Li Lu | January 2, 2023 |
When arson strikes the local mosque, Victoria, Texas must reckon with its troubled past. Three-part series.
| 2505 | 5 | "Beyond Utopia" | Madeleine Gavin | January 9, 2024 |
The story of families who risk everything escaping North Korea.
| 2506 | 6 | "Racist Trees" | Sara Newens and Mina T. Son | January 22, 2024 |
In Palm Springs, a historically Black neighborhood fights to remove a divisive wall of trees.
| 2507 | 7 | "Razing Liberty Square" | Katja Esson | January 29, 2024 |
The Liberty Square public housing community in Miami becomes ground zero for climate gentrification.
| 2508 | 8 | "Sister Úna Lived a Good Death" | Parthiv Parekh | February 5, 2024 |
A wisecracking nun with stage IV cancer teaches others that death doesn't have to be the end.
| 2509 | 9 | "Breaking the News" | Heather Courtney, Princess A. Hairston, and Chelsea Hernandez | February 19, 2024 |
Women and LGBTQ+ journalists launch startup The 19th* to buck a broken news media system.
| 2510 | 10 | "Greener Pastures" | Samuel-Ali Mirpoorian | March 25, 2024 |
Four Midwestern farm families persevere through climate change, industrialization, and mental health crises.
| 2511 | 11 | "If Dreams Were Lightning: Rural Healthcare Crisis" | Ramin Bahrani | March 25, 2024 |
With rural hospitals closing at alarming rates, a look at some of the people trying to get help in healthcare deserts.
| 2512 | 12 | "A Thousand Pines" | Sebastián Díaz Aguirre and Noam Osband | April 1, 2024 |
Over the course of a season, Oaxacan guest workers plant trees across America's forests.
| 2513 | 13 | "Matter of Mind: My Parkinson's" | Anna Moot-Levin and Laura Green | April 8, 2024 |
Three individuals navigate their lives with determination in the face of Parkinson's disease.
| 2514 | 14 | "One With the Whale" | Jim Wickens, Peter Chelkowski, and Yaari Walker | May 1, 2024 |
An Alaska Native family maintains a subsistence life on a tiny Bering Sea island where, if you don't hunt, you die.
| 2515 | 15 | "Space: The Longest Goodbye" | Ido Mizrahy | May 8, 2024 |
NASA psychologists prepare astronauts for the extreme isolation of a three-year-long mission to Mars.
| 2516 | 16 | "The Tuba Thieves" | Alison O'Daniel | May 20, 2024 |
The central mystery of this unconventional documentary isn't about theft; it's about the nature of sound itself.

=== Season 26 (2024–25) ===
| Prod. code | No. in season | Title | Directed by | Original airdate |
|---|---|---|---|---|
| 2601 | 1 | "One Person, One Vote?" | Maximina Juson | September 30, 2024 |
A look at the Electoral College through the eyes of four presidential electors during the 2020 United States presidential election.
| N–A | Short | "History of White People in America" | Ed Bell, Pierce Freelon, Jonathan Halperin, Aaron Keane, and Drew Takahashi | October 7, 2024 |
Musical animated series of shorts dedicated to telling diverse stories that chronicle the shaping of race relations in America.
| N–A | Short | "United States of Comedy" | Habib Yazdi | November 12, 2024 |
Series of shorts about emerging voices in stand-up comedy from across America, each trying to make it big.
| 2602 | 2 | "Make Peace or Die: Honor the Fallen" | Manny Marquez | November 24, 2024 |
A Marine Corps veteran makes it his mission to help Gold Star families of the fallen, and find healing himself.
| 2603–2607 | 3–7 | "Dallas, 2019" | Darius Clark Monroe | January 3, 2025 |
Five-part series showing a cross section of life in Dallas the year before the pandemic hit.
| 2608 | 8 | "Minted" | Nicholas Bruckman | January 6, 2025 |
The rise and fall of the NFT (Non-fungible token) phenomenon that transformed the art world.
| 2609 | 9 | "Without Arrows" | Jonathan Olshefski and Elizabeth Day | January 13, 2025 |
A champion grass dancer returns home to South Dakota after 13 years to reconnect with his Indigenous culture.
| 2610 | 10 | "The Strike" | JoeBill Muñoz and Lucas Guilkey | February 3, 2025 |
a small movement against solitary confinement turned into a massive 2013 California prisoner hunger strike.
| 2611 | 11 | "The In Between" | Robie Flores | February 10, 2025 |
A filmmaker returns to her hometown on the Mexico-United States border to reflect on growing up fronterizo.
| 2612 | 12 | "Skin of Glass" | Denise Zmekhol | February 17, 2025 |
How the turbulent history of a filmmaker's architect father's iconic building in São Paulo reflects Brazil's own struggles.
| 2613 | 13 | "Bike Vessel" | Eric D. Seals | February 24, 2025 |
A father and son take a 350-mile bike ride in a quest for health and bonding.
| 2614 | 14 | "Home Court" | Erica Tanamachi | March 24, 2025 |
The coming-of-age story and rise of Ashley Chea, a Cambodian American basketball prodigy.
| 2615 | 15 | "WE WANT THE FUNK!" | Stanley Nelson and Nicole London | April 8, 2025 |
The syncopated story of funk music, from its roots to the explosion of '70s urban funk and beyond.
| 2616 | 16 | "Free for All: The Public Library" | Dawn Logsdon and Lucie Faulknor | April 29, 2025 |
How public libraries shaped a nation and remain a beloved sanctuary for Americans today.
| 2617 | 17 | "Matter of Mind: My Alzheimer's" | Anna Moot-Levin and Laura Green | May 5, 2025 |
Three families are transformed when a loved one is diagnosed with Alzheimer's disease.
| 2618 | 18 | "And So It Begins" | Ramona Diaz | May 12, 2025 |
During the historic 2022 presidential race in the Philippines, a grassroots movement emerges to protect truth from growing threats to democracy and journalism.
| 2619 | 19 | "Who is Michael Jang?" | Michael Jacobs | May 19, 2025 |
Elusive photographer Michael Jang shares his wondrous work with the world.

=== Season 27 (2025-26) ===
| Prod. code | No. in season | Title | Directed by | Original airdate |
|---|---|---|---|---|
| N–A | Short | "The Opioid Trilogy, Episode 2: Do No Harm" | Joanna Rudnick | September 16, 2025 |
One woman’s journey from heroin addiction to healing, recovery, and hope.
| N–A | Short | "The Opioid Trilogy, Episode 3: Coming Home" | Joanna Rudnick | September 23, 2025 |
A Milwaukee woman’s journey from addiction to healing reshapes recovery for her community.
| 2701 | 1 | "Cracking the Code: Phil Sharp and the Biotech Revolution" | Bill Haney | October 6, 2025 |
Phil Sharp’s RNA discovery reshaped science, medicine, and the global biotech industry.
| 2702 | 2 | "Ratified" | Sabaah Folayan and Deborah R Draper | October 20, 2025 |
A bipartisan coalition continues a century-long fight to add gender equality into the Constitution.
| 2703 | 3 | "Life After" | Reid Davenport | November 3, 2025 |
A filmmaker investigates assisted dying through the lens of disabled voices missing from the debate.
| 2705 | 4 | "Vivien's Wild Ride" | Vivien Hillgrove | January 26, 2026 |
When her eyesight begins to fade, a film editor reimagines belonging and what it truly means to see.
| 2706 | 5 | "The Librarians" | Kim A Snyder | February 9, 2026 |
Librarians across the U.S. examine how restrictions on library content are shaping communities.
| 2707 | 6 | "The Inquisitor" | Angela Tucker | February 23, 2026 |
Meet Barbara Jordan: a civil rights icon whose powerful voice masked a complex private life.
| 2708 | 7 | "Keep Quiet and Forgive" | Sarah McClure | March 23, 2026 |
An Amish sexual assault survivor breaks her silence, sparking a movement for justice and reform.
| 2709 | 8 | "The Tallest Dwarf" | Julie Forrest Wyman | April 6, 2026 |
A filmmaker seeks belonging in the little people community and explores dwarfism within her family.
| 2710 | 9 | "BACKSIDE: The Unseen Hands of Horse Racing" | Raúl O. Paz-Pastrana | April 13, 2026 |
Behind the Kentucky Derby's glamour, unseen workers keep racing’s biggest stage running.
| 2711 | 10 | "Natchez" | Suzannah Herbert | May 11, 2026 |
Natchez, Mississippi, is famous for its antebellum homes, but what’s left out of the tours?
| 2712 | 11 | "Light of the Setting Sun" | Vicky Du | May 18, 2026 |
One family. Four generations shaped by displacement and trauma.
| 2713 | 12 | "Third Act" | Tad Nakamura | May 25, 2026 |
A filmmaker honors his father's (Robert A. Nakamura) legacy of art, activism, and resilience across generations.
