= Black Reel Award for Outstanding Independent Documentary =

Motion picture award for documentary

- Country: United States
- Presented by: The Black Reel Awards (BRAs)
- First award: Black Reel Awards of 2010
- Most recent winner: Mr. Soul! (Black Reel Awards of 2021)
- Website: blackreelawards.com

This article lists the winners and nominees for the Black Reel Award for Outstanding Independent Documentary. This award is given to the directors and was first awarded during the 2010 ceremony.

== Winners and nominees ==
Winners are listed first and highlighted in bold.

=== 2010s ===
Year	Film	Director	Ref
2010
2010	**Without Bias**	**Kirk Fraser**	
2010	Herskovits at the Heart of Blackness	Llewellyn M. Smith	
2010	Still Bill	Damani Baker and Alex Vlack	
2011
2011	**For the Best and for the Onion**	**Sani Elhadj Magori**	
2011	Gefilte Fish	Shelly Kling	
2011	One of These Mornings	Valery Lyman	
2012
2012	**Infiltrating Hollywood: The Rise and Fall of the Spook Who Sat By the Door**	**Christine Acham and Clifford Ward**	
2012	Brown Babies	Regina Griffin	
2012	Burn: The Evolution of An American City	Harold Jackson III	
2012	Gang Girl: A Mother's Journey to Save Her Daughter	Valerie Goodloe	
2012	The Manuscripts of Timbuktu	Zola Maseko	
2012	Zero Percent	Tim Skousen	
2013
2013	**Soul Food Junkies**	**Byron Hurt**	
2013	BMF: The Rise and Fall of Hip-Hop Drug Empire	Dan Sikorski	
2013	Contradictions of Fair Hope	S. Epatha Merkerson and Rockell Metcalf	
2013	From Fatherless to Fatherhood	Kobie Brown	
2013	Justice for Sale	Femeke and Isla van Velzen	
2014
2014	**The New Black**	**Yoruba Richen**	
2014	Africa: The Beat	Javier Arias Bal, Polo Vallejo and Manuel Velasco	
2014	I Want My Name Back	Roger Paradiso	
2014	Lenny Cooke	Benny and Joshua Safdie	
2014	Unheard: Black Women in Civil Rights	Nev Nnaji	
2015
2015	**25 to Life**	**Mike Brown**	
2015	Evolution of a Criminal	Darius Clark Monroe	
2015	Oscar Micheaux: The Czar of Black Hollywood	Bayer Mack	
2015	Through a Lens Darkly: Black Photographers and the Emergence of a People	Thomas Allen Harris	
2016
2016	**Mary Lou Williams: The Lady Who Swings the Band**	**Carol Bush**	
2016	Adina Howard 20: A Story of Sexual Liberation	Gezus Zaire	
2016	Be Known	Dwayne Johnson-Cochran	
2016	Cody High: A Life Remodeled Project	Walter V. Marshall	
2016	Romeo is Bleeding	Jason Zeldes	
2017	—N/a		
2018
2018	**Tell Them We Are Rising: The Story of Black Colleges and Universities**	**Stanley Nelson Jr.**	
2018	Back to Natural: A Documentary Film	Gillian Scott-Ward	
2018	Quest	Jonathan Olshefski	
2018	Yemanja: Wisdom From the African Heart of Brazil	Donna Roberts & Donna Reed	
2018	Zo! Making of Skybreak!	Donnie Seales Jr.	
2019
2019	**Sammy Davis Jr.: I've Gotta Be Me**	**Sam Pollard**	
2019	Basquiat: Rage to Riches	David Schulman	
2019	Lorraine Hansberry: Sighted Eyes/Feeling Heart	Tracey Heather Strain	

=== 2020s ===
Year	Film	Director	Ref
2020
2020	**No Lye: An American Beauty Story**	**Bayer Mack**	
2020	16 Bars	Sam Bathrick	
2020	The Remix: Hip Hop x Fashion	Lisa Cortes & Farah X	
2021
2021	**Mr. Soul!**	**Melissa Haizlip**	
2021	The Sit-In: Harry Belafonte Hosts the Tonight Show	Yoruba Richen	
2021	With Drawn Arms	Glenn Kaino & Afshin Shahidi	
2022
2022	100 Years from Mississippi	Tarabu Betserai Kirkland	
2022	Big Chief, Black Hawk	Jonathan Isaac Jackson	
2022	I Still Breathe	Alfred George Bailey	
2022	Little Satchmo	John Alexander	
2022	Unzipped: An Autopsy of American Inequality	Colin K. Gray	

== Multiple nominations and wins ==
=== Multiple nominations ===
2 Nominations

- Bayer Mack
- Yoruba Richen
