= East of Salinas =

- Country of origin: United States
- Original language: English

Production
- Running time: 72 minutes

Original release
- Release: December 28, 2015

East of Salinas is a 2015 American television documentary film which follows the life of an 8-year-old boy, Jose Anzaldo, the son of Mexican migrant farmworkers living near Salinas, California and his teacher, Oscar Ramos. It was directed by Jackie Mow and Laura Pacheco. The film premiered in December 2015 as part of the PBS documentary series Independent Lens.
