= Pan African Film Festival =

Film festival in Los Angeles, US

Pan African Film Festival (PAFF) is a non-profit corporation in Los Angeles, California, United States, that states its goal is to promote "cultural understanding among peoples of African descent" through exhibiting art and film. It hosts an Oscar-qualifying film festival and an arts festival in Los Angeles in February of each year. The Los Angeles Times in 2013 called the film festival "the largest black film festival" in the United States.

== Background ==
The festival was founded in 1992 by actors Danny Glover, Ja'net Dubois, and executive director Ayuko Babu. Babu had no ties to Hollywood and was working as a financial consultant before he contributed to finding the film festival. Glover and actress Whoopi Goldberg co-hosted the festival in 1992.

One of the main goals was to expose others to African films because many of the films were not being screened and going unnoticed. Babu states, "A showcase festival, maybe two of them. First, try one in Hollywood. That would get the attention of the movie crowd and would stimulate international interest. Then, try Washington that would draw in the political community." Another goal was to connect other African people to each other because there is so much diversity amongst African people.

It featured over 40 films by Black directors from four continents. The Los Angeles Times said the films had universal themes as well as African themes: "the overthrow of colonial governments, the clash between modern values and traditional values, and tales of gifted artists". Films at the first festival included Sarraounia, Heritage Africa, and Lord of the Street. In 2013, the film festival attracted approximately 30,000 patrons, and the arts festival attracted around 75,000. In 2014, the film festival featured 179 films from 46 countries. The films included feature-length documentaries, short documentaries, narrative feature films, narrative short films, and web series.

== Films ==
=== Tsotsi (2005) ===
Directed by Gavin Hood, the film shows what life is like in South Africa as a youth. The themes revolved around violence, redemption, and humanity.

=== Dry (2014) ===
Directed by Stephanie Okereke, which is about child marriage and is inspired by a true story. Okereke first learned about child marriage going on in Nigeria when she attended college. She wanted to bring this issue to the media to bring awareness. It got so much attention that Gambia's government banned child marriage.

== Awards ==
The Pan African Film & Arts Festival presents annual awards recognizing achievement in narrative, documentary, and short filmmaking. Categories include Jury Awards, Audience Awards, Programmers' Awards, and other special honors.

Past Winners
Year	Award Category	Award	Country	Title	Director
2024	Jury Award	Best Feature Narrative	United States	We Grown Now	Minhal Baig
2024	Jury Award	Best First Feature Narrative	Brazil	Power Alley	Lillah Halla
2024	Jury Award	Best Feature Documentary	United States	Max Roach: The Drum Also Waltzes	Ben Shapiro (director) and Sam Pollard (filmmaker)
2024	Jury Award	Best First Feature Documentary	Ghana	Brief Tender Light	Arthur Musah
2024	Jury Award	Best Short Narrative	South Africa	The Last Ranger	Cindy Lee
2024	Jury Award	Best Short Documentary	United States	Own the 8 Count	Child
2024	Audience Favorite	Narrative Feature	Ethiopia	Doka	Kidist Yilma
2024	Audience Favorite	Narrative Feature	United States	Outlaw Posse (film)	Mario Van Peebles
2024	Audience Favorite	Documentary Feature	United Kingdom	HumaniTree: A Story of Us Humans	Nuakai Aru
2024	Audience Favorite	Documentary Feature	United States	Respect My Crown: The Rise of African American Women in California Politics	Pamela Bright-Moon
2024	Audience Favorite	Short Narrative	United States	Superman Doesn’t Steal	Tamika Lamison
2024	Audience Favorite	Short Documentary	United States	The Orchestra Chuck Built	Christopher Stoudt
2024	Programmers' Award	Best Narrative Feature	United States	Outlaw Posse (film)	Mario Van Peebles
2024	Programmers' Award	Best Documentary Feature	United States	One Person, One Vote?	Maximina Juson
2024	Programmers' Award	Best Short	United States	Inner Demons	Jasmine J. Johnson
2024	Janet Dubois	Best Narrative Feature	United States	Bob Marley: One Love	Reinaldo Marcus Green
2024	Janet Dubois	Best Documentary	United States	Sing! Fight! Sing! Fight! From LeRoi to Amiri	Colin Still
2024	Janet Dubois	Best Short	United States	As the Cookie Crumbles	Aimiende Negbenebor Sela
2024	Janet Dubois	International Feature Award	United States	For the Love of the Motherland	Theodros “Teddy” Teshome
2023	Jury Award	Best Feature Narrative	United Kingdom	Rye Lane	Raine Allen-Miller
2023	Jury Award	Best First Feature Narrative	Nigeria / United Kingdom	A Song From the Dark	Ogo Okpue
2023	Jury Award	Best Feature Documentary	France / United States	King of Kings: Chasing Edward Jones	Harriet Marin Jones
2023	Jury Award	Best First Feature Documentary	United States	Wade in the Water: A Journey into Black Surfing and Aquatic Culture	David Mesfinn
2023	Jury Award	Best Short Narrative	United States	True Story: God Tells Bad Jokes	Matthew Law
2023	Jury Award	Best Short Documentary	United States	American Justice on Trial: People vs. Newton	Andrew Abrahams & Herb Ferrette
2023	Audience Favorite	Narrative Feature	United States	First	Jahmela Yarbrough & Brandon Yarbrough
2023	Audience Favorite	Documentary Feature	France / Italy / United States	Hargrove	Eliane Henri
2023	Audience Favorite	Short Narrative	Haiti/United States	Port of a Prince	JR Aristide
2023	Audience Favorite	Short Documentary	United States/Sierra Leone	Ifine	Adisa Septuri & Ebony Gilbert
2023	Programmers' Award	Narrative Feature	South Africa	The Honeymoon	Bianca Isaac
2023	Programmers' Award	Documentary	Cape Verde / Egypt / Ghana / Guinea / Bissau / Kenya / Morocco / Senegal / South Africa / Tanzania	The Africologist: The Chronicles of Africa	Valerio Lopes
2023	Programmers' Award	Short Narrative	Jamaica	Raw Materials	Sosiessia Nixon-Kelly
2023	Programmers' Award	Short Documentary	United States	Team Dream	Luchina Fisher
2023	PAFF Executive	Narrative Feature	Senegal / Mali / Italy / France / Canada	Dancing the Twist in Bamako	Robert Guédiguian
2023	PAFF Executive	Documentary Feature	United States	Fantastic Negrito: Have You Lost Your Mind Yet	Yvan Iturriaga & Francisco Nuñez
2023	PAFF Executive	Short Narrative	United States	We Were Meant To	Tari Wariebi
2023	PAFF Executive	Short Documentary	United States / Sierra Leone	Ifine	Adisa Septuri & Ebony Gilbert
2022	Jury Award	Best Feature Narrative	Chad	Lingui, the Sacred Bonds	Mahamat-Saleh Haroun
2022	Jury Award	Best First Feature Narrative	United States	Queen of Glory	Nana Mensah
2022	Jury Award	Best Feature Documentary	United States	Buddy Guy: the Blues Chase the Blues Away	Charles Todd & Devin Amar
2022	Jury Award	Best First Feature Documentary	South Africa	Africa and I	Othmane Zolati & Chris Green
2022	Jury Award	Best Short Narrative	United States	Slow Pulse	Marshall Tyler
2022	Jury Award	Best Short Documentary	Cuba / United States	Cuba in Africa	Negash Abdurahman
2022	Programmers' Award	Narrative Feature	Nigeria	Ayinla	Tunde Kelani
2022	Programmers' Award	Documentary	United Kingdom	Race Today	Wayne G Saunders
2022	Programmers' Award	Short Narrative	United States	2 Eye Drops from Normal	Mora Carew
2022	Programmers' Award	Short Documentary	United States	For Love & Legacy	A.K. Sandhu
2022	Audience	Feature Narrative	United States	Remember Me: The Mahalia Jackson Story	Denise Dowse
2022	Audience	Feature Documentary	United States	The Dream Whisperer	Eric Drath
2022	Audience	Feature Documentary	United States	Ferguson Rises	Mobolaji Olambiwonnu
2022	Audience	Short Narrative	United States	Contraban	Chelsea Hicks
2022	Audience	Short Documentary	United States	Crawford – The Man the South Forgot	Carol Devoe
2022	Janet Dubois	Narrative	United States	A Brother’s Whisper	Jacinto Taras Riddick
2022	Janet Dubois	Documentary	United States / Canada / Ethiopia / France / Germany / Jamaica / UK	Grandpa was an Emperor	Constance Marks
2021	Jury Award	Best Feature Narrative	South Africa	Back of the Moon	Angus Gibson
2021	Jury Award	Best First Feature Narrative	Australia	Caged Birds	Fredrick Leach
2021	Jury Award	Best Feature Documentary	United States	Firestarter - The Story of Bangarra	Wayne Blair, Nel Minchin
2021	Jury Award	Best First Feature Documentary	United States	Hollywood's Architect: The Paul R. Williams Story	Royal Kennedy Rodgers, Kathy McCampbell Vance
2021	Jury Award	Best Short Narrative	Egypt	Tuk-Tuk	Mohamed Kheidr
2021	Festival Award	Narrative Feature Award	Nigeria	The Milk Maid	Desmond Ovbiagele
2021	Festival Award	Contemporary Vision Award	United States	Who Is Gatsby Randolph?	Kobie Randolph
2021	Festival Award	Documentary Feature	Canada / France / United Kingdom	Uprooted - The Journey of Jazz Dance	Khadifa Wong
2021	Festival Award	Short Narrative or Documentary	United States	The Cypher	Letia Solomon
2021	Festival Award	Best Actor	United States	Chase Gutzmore, Standing Ovation	Chase Gutzmore, Standing Ovation

== Notable directors and actors ==
- Joseph Gaï Ramaka
- Omari Hardwick
- Nicole Beharie
- Stephanie Okereke
- Gavin Hood

== See also ==
- Pan-Africanism
- List of film festivals
