= Parliament Funkadelic: One Nation Under a Groove =

2005 documentary film

- Genre: Documentary
- Written by: Yvonne Smith
- Directed by: Yvonne Smith
- Narrated by: Eddie Griffin
- Country of origin: United States
- Original language: English

Production
- Producer: Harlene Freezer
- Editors: Sikay Tang; Scott Doniger; Susan Skoog
- Running time: 53 minutes
- Production companies: Brazen Hussy Productions; ITVS

Original release
- Network: PBS; Independent Lens
- Release: October 11, 2005

Parliament Funkadelic: One Nation Under A Groove is a documentary broadcast in the US on PBS in October 2005 as part of the Independent Lens series. The documentary chronicles the development of the Parliament-Funkadelic musical collective, led by the producer, writer and arranger George Clinton. Parliament-Funkadelic: One Nation Under A Groove was developed by Brazen Hussy Productions, based in New York City and led by director Yvonne Smith.

The documentary combines archival footage, contemporary interviews with P-Funk band members, and stylized animation. It follows the evolution of the band from the early days of doo-wop to its induction into the Rock and Roll Hall of Fame in 1997.

It is narrated by the comedian Eddie Griffin. It is notable for showing footage of P-Funk in 1969 from the WGBH series Say Brother (now called Basic Black).

== Interviews ==
=== P-Funk members ===
- George Clinton
- Bootsy Collins
- Bernie Worrell
- Billy Bass Nelson
- Garry Shider
- Ray Davis
- Fuzzy Haskins
- Grady Thomas
- Calvin Simon
- Cordell Mosson
- Dawn Silva
- Jeanette Washington
- Ron Scribner
- Cholly Bassoline
- Tom Vickers
- Ron Dunbar
- Pedro Bell
- Overton Loyd
- Ronald "Stozo" Edwards

=== Others ===
- Nona Hendryx
- Rick James
- Shock G
- Ice Cube
- Harvey McGee
- Cecil Holmes
- Armen Boladian
- Rickey Vincent
- Reginald Hudlin

== Reception ==
Alynda Wheat of Entertainment Weekly said of the special: "they've influenced everyone from Prince to the Red Hot Chili Peppers, yet even P-Funk fans know more about the band's psychedelic space-pyramid mythology than its origins as a doo-wop group. It's understandable given the complexity of their history (label skirmishes, infighting, dual identities). In spite of all that, Parliament and its wild antics defined the '70s rock-soul fusion that became funk. This documentary ably traces the rise (and decline) of P-Funkmasters George Clinton, Bootsy Collins, and the crew, giving them their due as creators of 'a complete aesthetic revolution'."

In his review for the Detroit Free Press, Mike Duffy opined the documentary "explores P-Funk's history, cultural importance and blissfully kinetic, dance-perfect music ... filmmaker Yvonne Smith has smartly traced the sometimes overlooked history of Clinton's fascinating musical pilgrimage from New Jersey hairdresser and creative force behind a 1960s doo-wop group called the Parliaments to the 1970s Detroit funk wizard who imaginatively fired his bop gun and hit the boogaloo bull's-eye with a whole new groove". He also pointed out how "P-Funk's spaced-out Mothership mythology and the group's liberating musical fusion of R&B and rock 'n' roll have influenced a wildly eclectic range of artists from Prince to the Talking Heads and Public Enemy to the Red Hot Chili Peppers".

Diane Werts of Newsday noted how "Bernie Worrell's keyboard thump and Eddie Hazel's guitar sparked the sampling artistry of hip-hop, the next aesthetic to rise from George Clinton's roots ... testifying to that for director Yvonne Smith are Ice Cube, De La Soul, Shock G of Digital Underground and The Red Hot Chili Peppers ... even Rick James acknowledged the Clinton influence; all those P-Funk offshoots (Bootsy Collins, Parlet, The Brides of Funkenstein) led the way for James and Prince to attempt their own mini-music empires". She also highlighted the "abundant vintage concert footage, though it can barely hint at the wild ride of a late-'70s P-Funk extravaganza".

== See also ==
- List of Independent Lens films
