= Sabrina Schmidt Gordon =

American documentary filmmaker

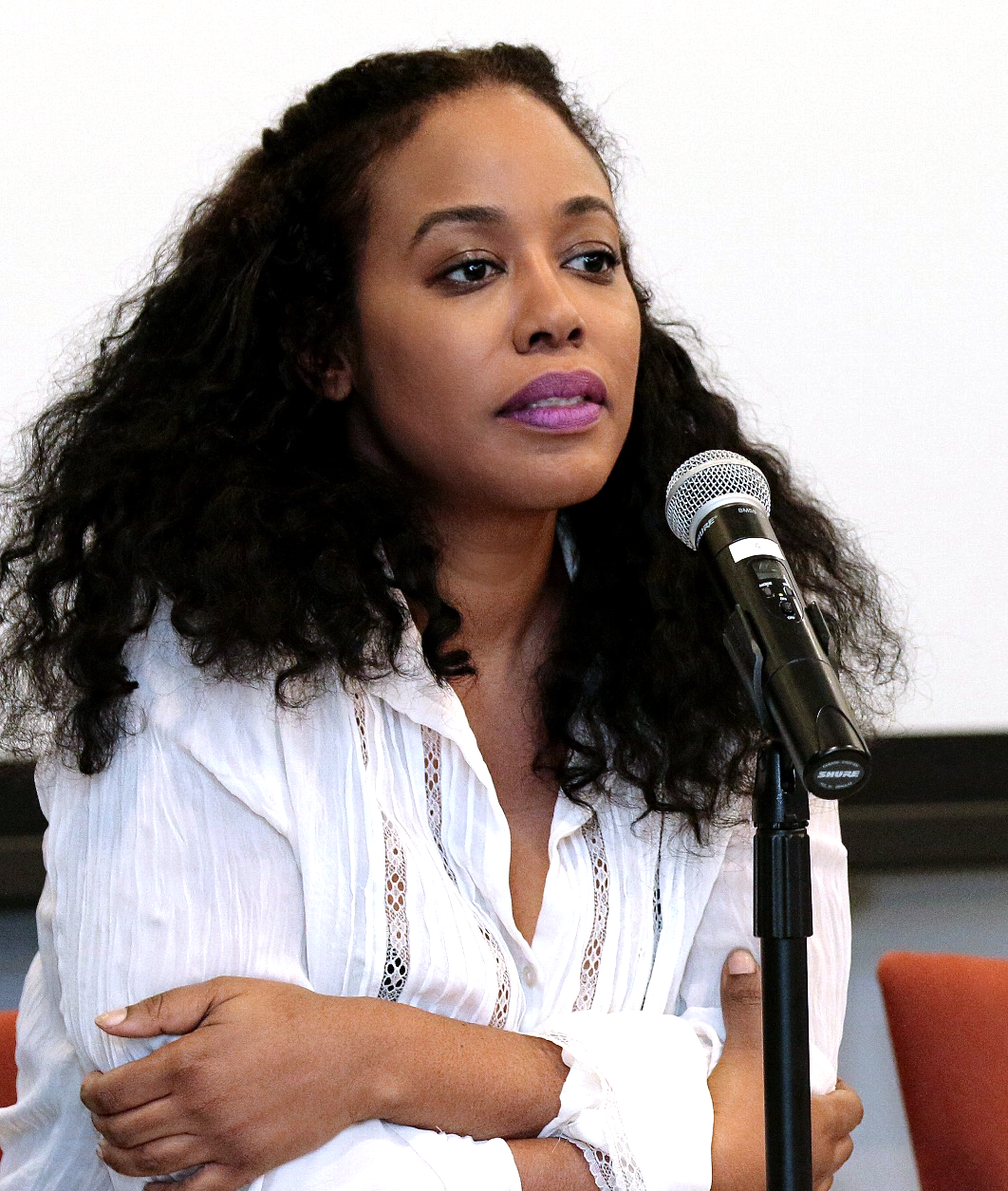
- Education: New York University
- Occupation: Filmmaker

Sabrina Schmidt Gordon is an American documentary filmmaker. She is known for producing and editing films on cultural and social issues. In 2018, she was invited to become a member of The Academy of Motion Picture Arts and Sciences (AMPAS).

Gordon co-produced and edited DOCUMENTED, a documentary about Jose Antonio Vargas, a journalist and immigration activist. DOCUMENTED was nominated for the 2015 NAACP Image Award for Outstanding Documentary. She won ADIFF 2015's Public Award for the Best Film Directed by a Woman of Color for BaddDDD Sonia Sanchez, about poet and activist Sonia Sanchez. The film was broadcast on America ReFramed and nominated for a News and Documentary Emmy Award for Outstanding Arts & Culture Documentary.

Other notable filmography include Hip Hop: Beyond Beats and Rhymes, produced with Byron Hurt, and Quest, which was nominated for the 2018 Independent Spirit Award for Best Documentary Feature, the 2019 Peabody Award and the 2019 News and Documentary Emmy Award for Outstanding Documentary and Outstanding Social Issue Documentary.

Gordon graduated from New York University and is an adjunct faculty member at Columbia University.

== Filmography (partial) ==
- Seeds (Premiere: Sundance Film Festival and winner of the Grand Jury Prize for Documentary, 2025)
- Black Girls (Peacock) (Premiere: Tribeca Film Festival, 2024; Sundance BrandStorytelling Nominee, 2025)
- Victim/Suspect (Netflix) (Premiere: Sundance Film Festival, 2023)
- To the End (Hulu) (Premiere: Sundance Film Festival, 2022)
- Quest (POV - PBS) (Premiere: Sundance Film Festival)
- BaddDDD Sonia Sanchez (America ReFramed - PBS) (Premiere: Full Frame Documentary Film Festival, 2015)
- DOCUMENTED (CNN Films) (Premiere: AFI Docs)
- Mrs. Goundo's Daughter (Afropop - PBS) (Premiere: AFI Docs)
- Hip Hop: Beyond Beats and Rhymes (Independent Lens - PBS) (Premiere: Sundance Film Festival)
