= Doki Doki (short film) =

- Promotional poster
- Directed by: Chris Eska
- Written by: Chris Eska
- Produced by: Aya Mitsuhashi
- Starring: Endô Yumi; Hayato Sugano; Sae Takenaka
- Narrated by: Haruki Iwakiri
- Cinematography: Yasuhisa Tanida
- Edited by: Chris Eska
- Music by: Mark Mitchell
- Release date: 2003
- Running time: 30 minutes (original); 49 minutes (director's cut)
- Country: Japan
- Language: Japanese

Doki Doki (ドキドキ) is a 2003 Japanese short drama film written, directed, and edited by American filmmaker Chris Eska. It explores the themes of social isolation and disconnect felt by people on the crowded daily commuter trains in Tokyo.

== Plot ==
Every day, Yumi travels on the same early morning Tokyo commuter train, seeing the same people in the same seats of the same carriage. They never acknowledge each other, and Yumi often wonders about their lives. Of particular interest is Yosuke, who attended the same pre-school as Yumi but apparently no longer recognizes her. After a chain of events disrupts the normal commute, Yumi takes the opportunity to secretly follow Yosuke through the streets of Tokyo. Before she leaves the train, she shares a moment of connection with the shy and awkward schoolgirl Makiko. While Yumi discovers more about Yosuke and eventually meets him, Makiko deals with school bullies and struggles to relate to her classmates and family. As evening comes, all three of their lives intersect.

== Cast ==
- Endô Yumi as Yumi
- Hayato Sugano as Yosuke
- Sae Takenaka as Makiko
- Haruki Iwakiri as narrator (voice)
- Chris Eska as mail carrier
- Yuri Kaburagi as madame
- Tatsuyuki Katsuki as salaryman
- Hitomi Kobayashi as mean boy
- Tomoko Namiki as mean girl
- Hayato Sugano as Yosuke
- Sae Takenaka as Makiko
- Chiaki Yanagimoto as amusement park staff

== Production ==
Eska created Doki Doki as part of his studies at the UCLA School of Theater, Film and Television. It takes its title from the onomatopoeiac sound of a beating heart in Japanese sound symbolism, and was shot on the trains and streets of Tokyo and Yokohama.

== Release ==
Doki Doki was aired as part of the PBS series Independent Lens on December 21, 2004, where it was introduced by Susan Sarandon.

== Reception ==
Doki Doki has a rating of 100% on Rotten Tomatoes (albeit from a single review) and an average rating of 7.4/10 from 174 reviews on IMDb.
