= One Person, One Vote? =

American documentary film

- Official release film poster
- Directed by: Maximina Juson
- Written by: Maximina Juson
- Produced by: Maximina Juson, Daresha Kyi, Christie Herring (co-producer)
- Cinematography: Maximina Juson, Martina Radwan, Michael Vargas
- Edited by: Maximina Juson, Michael Vargas, Sari Gilman
- Music by: Mark Batson
- Production company: HUMovies (Humans Understanding Machinery)
- Distributed by: PBS (Independent Lens)
- Release date: 2024
- Running time: 78 minutes
- Country: United States
- Language: English

One Person, One Vote? is a 2024 American documentary film about the United States Electoral College directed by Maximina Juson. The film explores the history, structure, and contemporary role of the Electoral College in U.S. presidential elections.

The film made its world premiere at the Pan African Film Festival in Los Angeles where it won the Programmers' Award for Best Documentary Feature, and was later broadcast nationally on PBS as the season opener for the Independent Lens series.

The project received funding support from the National Endowment for the Humanities (NEH).

The film was distributed for public television through the Independent Television Service (ITVS).

== Synopsis ==
The documentary explores the origins of the Electoral College during the Constitutional Convention, including its ties to compromises involving slavery and the disproportionate political influence granted to enslaver states through mechanisms such as the Three-fifths Compromise. It also examines how the system functions in contemporary presidential elections.

Through interviews and historical context, the film follows four presidential electors from the 2020 presidential election—a Republican elector, a Democratic elector, a Green Party elector, and a Kanye West elector—as well as scholars, historians, and grassroots activists both supporting and opposing the National Popular Vote Interstate Compact, to illustrate the mechanics and implications of the electoral process. The film also examines efforts to challenge or influence the certification of electoral votes following the 2020 election, including events surrounding January 6, 2021.

== Production ==
The film premiered on September 30, 2024, as the season opener for Season 26 of PBS's Independent Lens series.

One Person, One Vote? was directed, written, and produced by Maximina Juson. Animation by Pierre Bennu.

== Reception ==
Salon, in an article entitled "One Person, One Vote Finally Explains the Electoral College in an Engaging Way", described the film's approach to explaining the Electoral College and its contemporary relevance.

Forbes interviewed Juson alongside presidential electors Derrick Wilburn (Republican) and Polly Baca (Democrat), as well as Independent Lens executive producer Lois Vossen and Columbia Journalism School Dean Jelani Cobb. In the interview, Juson discussed the importance of public understanding of the Electoral College as a foundation for informed discussion about presidential elections, adding, "Let's dialogue, not demonize."

Deadline wrote that the film highlights how "The framers [of the Constitution] gave people no right to elect their president..." in its coverage of the documentary.

The film was also featured in a segment on The Daily Show in which host Michael Kosta interviewed Dean Cobb accompanied by a clip from the film.

Overly Honest Reviews wrote that the film, "allow[s] for a panoramic understanding of the Electoral College" while encouraging viewers to form their own opinions.

== Educational screenings ==
Following its broadcast, the film was screened at academic and cultural institutions, including New York University's Center for Black Visual Culture, the Hammer Museum in Los Angeles with UCLA School of Law, and Rollins College.
