= Why Can't We Be a Family Again? =

2002 film

- Film poster
- Directed by: Murray Nossel; Roger Weisberg
- Written by: Roger Weisberg
- Produced by: Deborah Clancy; Murray Nossel; Julie Sacks; Roger Weisberg
- Narrated by: Ossie Davis
- Cinematography: Ed Marritz
- Edited by: Lisa Shreve
- Production company: Public Policy Productions
- Distributed by: Filmakers Library
- Release date: 2002
- Running time: 27 minutes
- Country: United States
- Language: English

Why Can't We Be a Family Again? is a 2002 American short documentary film directed by Roger Weisberg and Murray Nossel about two African American brothers in Brooklyn struggling to reunite with their mother, a recovering drug addict. It was nominated for an Academy Award for Best Documentary Short. It later aired on Independent Lens.

== See also ==
- List of documentary films
