= Home From School: The Children of Carlisle =

2021 documentary film

Home From School: The Children of Carlisle is a 2021 documentary film. The film tells the story of a group of Northern Arapaho who seek to recover the remains of Arapaho children buried in the 1880s on the grounds of the Carlisle Indian Industrial School in Carlisle, Pennsylvania.

The film aired on Independent Lens on PBS on November 23, 2021.
