= Maximina Juson =

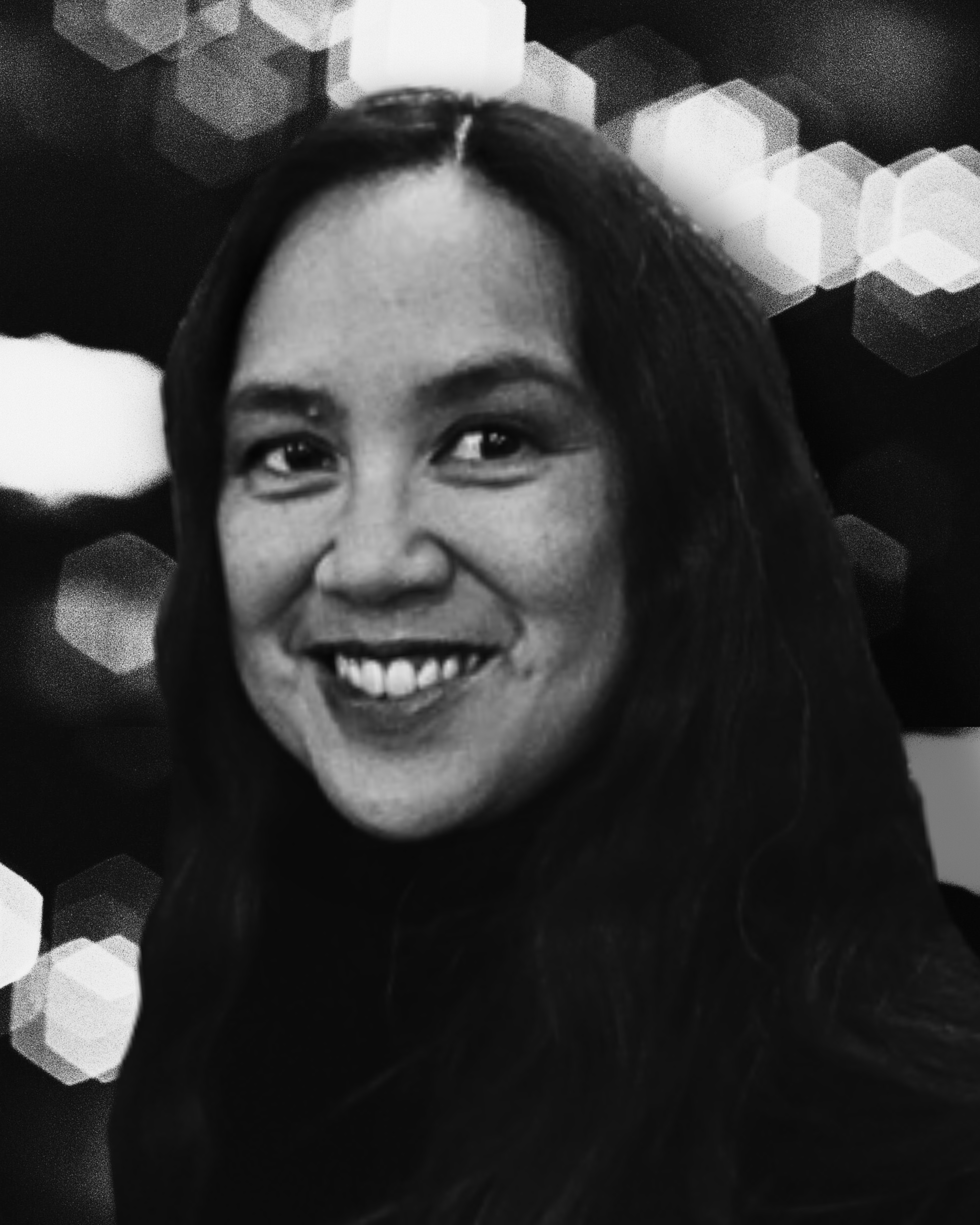
- Maximina Juson (2026)
- Occupations: Filmmaker, producer
- Known for: One Person, One Vote?

Maximina Juson is an American documentary filmmaker and producer. She directed the 2024 documentary film One Person, One Vote?, which examines the history and contemporary function of the United States Electoral College. The film premiered on PBS as part of the documentary series Independent Lens.

Juson is the founder of the Los Angeles-based production company HUMovies (Humans Understanding Machinery).

== Career ==
Juson directed, produced, wrote and edited One Person, One Vote?, a documentary examining the Electoral College through the experiences of presidential electors from the 2020 United States presidential election. The film received support from the National Endowment for the Humanities.

Salon.com described the film as "a film that explains the Electoral College in an engaging way. Forbes covered the project citing quotes from the film's participants which included real-world electors from the 2020 presidential election. Deadline noted how the film sheds light on the system's inner workings that very few Americans understand. The film was featured in a segment on The Daily Show.

Juson leads civic engagement and media literacy initiatives through the organization "Civics Is Sexy," which has collaborated with civic, cultural, and educational institutions relating to civic engagement through the arts.

Juson has also participated in discussions and programming focusing on elections, media literacy, civic engagement with organizations and institutions including the American Civil Liberties Union, the NAACP, the League of Women Voters, New York University, and the Hammer Museum, and local media outlets nationwide.

== Filmography ==
Year	Title	Role
2024	One Person, One Vote?	Director, producer, writer, editor
2022	Mama Bears	Consulting producer, additional camera
2020	Harlem Rising: A Community Changing the Odds	Producer
