= Lacey Schwartz Delgado =

American filmmaker and Second Lady of New York (born 1977)

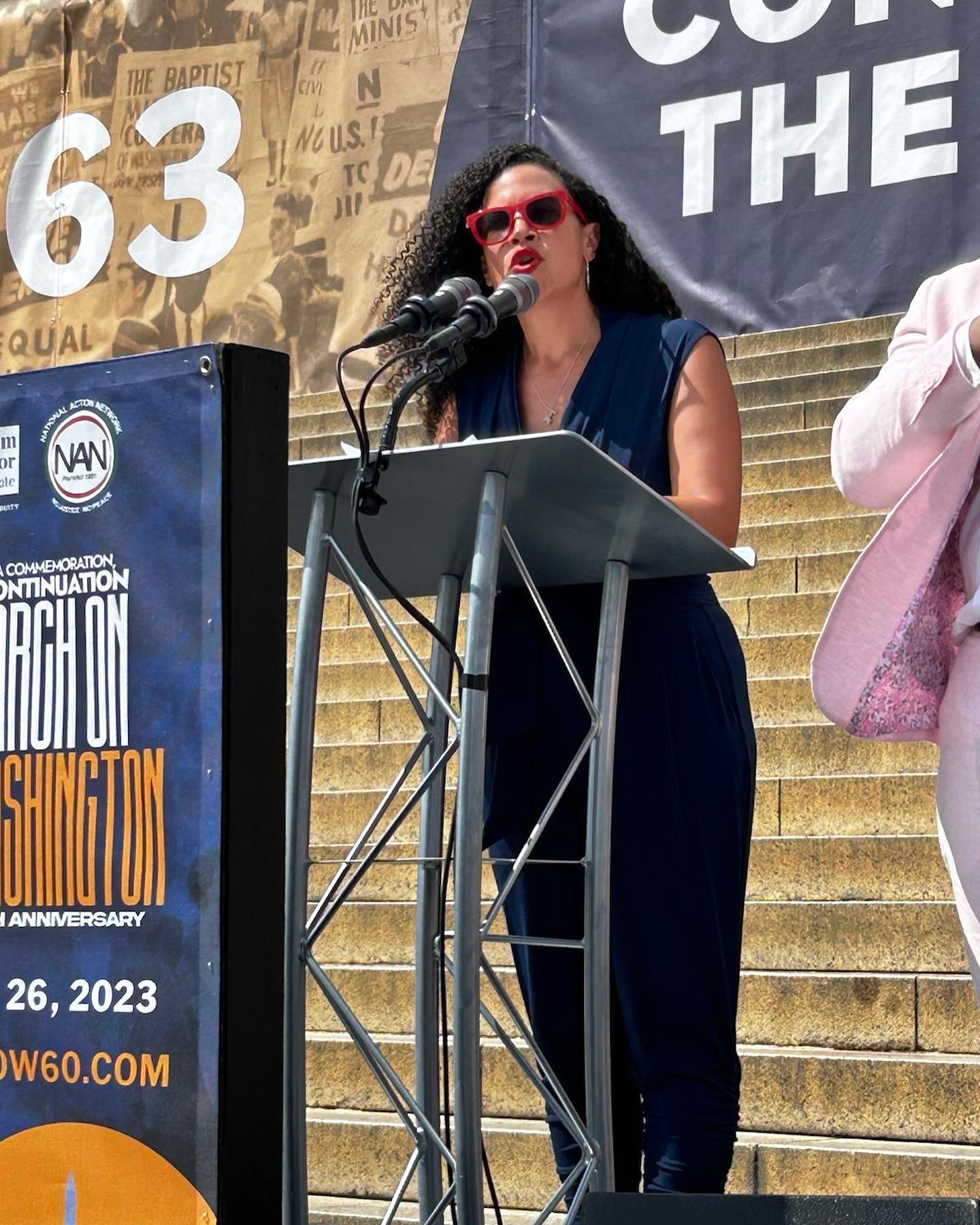

Second Lady of New York
- Assumed role May 25, 2022
- Lieutenant Governor: Antonio Delgado
- Preceded by: Cathleen Benjamin

Personal details
- Born: Lacey Alexandra Schwartz; January 28, 1977 (age 49)
- Spouse: Antonio Delgado (m. 2011)
- Children: 2
- Education: Georgetown University (BA); Harvard University (JD)
- Occupation: Filmmaker
- Known for: Little White Lie

Lacey Schwartz Delgado (née Lacey Alexandra Schwartz; born January 9, 1977) is an American filmmaker. She is the second lady of New York as the wife of lieutenant governor Antonio Delgado. Schwartz Delgado is notable for her 2015 PBS documentary Little White Lie.

== Early life ==
Schwartz Delgado was born on January 9, 1977. She is the daughter of Peggy Schwartz. She was raised by Robert and Peggy Schwartz in Woodstock, New York and is Jewish.

She attended Kingston High School.

Schwartz Delgado did not check the racial identity box on her college admission form, but was admitted as a black student at Georgetown University based on her photograph. During college, she learned that she was biracial and that Rodney Parker, an African American man, was her biological father. Schwartz graduated with a Bachelor of Arts cum laude with a major in government and a minor in studio arts from Georgetown University in 1998.

She earned a Juris Doctor at Harvard Law School in 2003.

== Career ==
Schwartz Delgado has worked as a managing director at Truth Aid and as a director of outreach at Be'chol Lashon.

As a filmmaker, Schwartz Delgado is best known for her 2015 PBS documentary, Little White Lie. In the documentary, Schwartz Delgado tells the story of her discovery of her true racial identity. She was raised to believe she was white and Jewish, but began to question her lineage during high school and college. When she was growing up, her family attributed her dark features to an ancestor who was a Sicilian Jew with a dark complexion. Following her first year of college, Schwartz Delgado confronted her mother and learned that she was the product of an affair her mother had with an African-American man.

Schwartz Delgado became the second lady of New York in 2022 by virtue of her husband's appointment as lieutenant governor.

== Personal life ==
In 2011, Schwartz married Antonio Delgado. Her husband previously served as U.S. Representative from New York's 19th congressional district and was appointed as Lieutenant Governor of New York in 2022 by Governor Kathy Hochul. They have identical twin sons.

Schwartz Delgado is Black and Jewish.

Honorary titles
Preceded by Cathleen Benjamin	Second Lady of New York; 2022–present	Current holder
