= Hip-Hop: Beyond Beats and Rhymes =

- Directed by: Byron Hurt
- Written by: Byron Hurt
- Produced by: Byron Hurt and Sabrina Schmidt Gordon
- Starring: Busta Rhymes; Chuck D; Clipse; Doug E. Fresh; Fat Joe; Jadakiss; M-1; Mos Def; Talib Kweli
- Cinematography: Bill Winters
- Edited by: Sabrina Schmidt Gordon
- Release dates: January 24, 2006 (Sundance Film Festival); February 20, 2007 (PBS)
- Running time: 56 minutes
- Country: United States
- Language: English

Hip-Hop: Beyond Beats and Rhymes is a 2006 documentary film written, produced, and directed by Byron Hurt. The documentary explores the issues of masculinity, violence, homophobia, and sexism in hip hop music and culture, through interviews with artists, academics, and fans. Hurt's activism in gender issues and his love of hip-hop caused him to feel what he described as a sense of hypocrisy, and began working on the film. The premiere of the film took place at the Sundance Film Festival, and was welcomed by a standing ovation. It has also won Best Documentary at the San Francisco Black Film Festival and the Audience Award at the Roxbury Film Festival. On February 20, 2007 the film aired on the PBS Emmy-winning documentary series, Independent Lens.

== Interviews ==
The film features interviews with many hip-hop artists including Busta Rhymes, Chuck D, Clipse, Doug E. Fresh, Fat Joe, Jadakiss, M-1, Tim'm West, Mos Def, and Talib Kweli. Hip-Hop: Beyond Beats and Rhymes also features academics such as Dr. James Peterson of Pennsylvania State University, Professor William Jelani Cobb of Spelman College, and Michael Eric Dyson of the University of Pennsylvania. Activists, journalists and poets such as Kevin Powell, Sarah Jones, and the Hip Hop Minister Conrad Tillard are also interviewed.

== Noted moments ==
Of the one-hour documentary, media outlets largely focused on three specific interviews:

Interviews with students of Spelman College regarding a protest against the appearance of Rapper Nelly, who originally contacted the school to have a bone marrow drive take place on campus. The student body asked the rapper to hold a forum to discuss his video "Tip Drill," in which he is seen sliding a credit card down the back side of a woman. In response, the rapper canceled plans to hold the bone marrow drive at the school.

An interview with Rapper Busta Rhymes in which the rapper walked out when confronted with a question about homophobia in the rap community. Rhymes is quoted as saying: "I can't partake in that conversation," followed by, "With all due respect, I ain't trying to offend nobody. . . What I represent culturally doesn't condone [homosexuality] whatsoever." When asked if the hip-hop culture would ever accept a homosexual rapper, Busta Rhymes then exited the interview.

To reveal the effect of the commodification of women in hip-hop, Hurt interviewed concertgoers at the BET Spring Fling in Daytona, FL. Hurt was appalled by the actions of black youth at the concert, who were indiscreetly touching and taking videos of women. One young man that was interviewed commented that "Look how they dress” to justify the actions of the men at the event. In this segment of the documentary, Byron claims that the objectification of women in hip-hop lyrics and music videos has taught young men to view women as sex objects for their own personal pleasure.

Many media outlets focused on the interview with activist and rapper, Chuck D of the rap group Public Enemy. The rapper was quoted as stating: "BET is the cancer of black manhood in the world, because they have one-dimensionalized us and commodified us into being a one-trick image. We're [shown] throwing money at the camera; we're flashing jewelry that could give a town in Africa water. We got $160 million contracts, 'cuz we got happy niggas." The rapper also stated a link existed between the sales of hip-hop music to young white Americans, and the amount of pressure on black artists to create more of that content: sex and violence.
