= Quest (2017 film) =

- Film poster
- Directed by: Jonathan Olshefski
- Produced by: Sabrina Schmidt Gordon
- Edited by: Lindsay Utz
- Music by: Christopher Rainey; T. Griffin
- Production company: Quest Fury Sound
- Distributed by: First Run Features
- Release date: January 21, 2017 (Sundance Film Festival)
- Running time: 105 minutes
- Country: United States
- Language: English

Quest is a 2017 American documentary film following a north-Philadelphia family over eight years. The film is directed by Jonathan Olshefski and produced by Sabrina Schmidt Gordon.

== Synopsis ==
Over an eight-year period, Quest closely follows the Rainey family—Christopher “Quest” Rainey, his wife Christine’a “Ma Quest,” their daughter P.J., along with Christine’a’s adult son William and his infant son—as they navigate life in a struggling North Philadelphia neighborhood.

The film opens with the couple’s wedding and shows Quest supporting the household through paper routes while Christine’a works at a women’s shelter. P.J., just eight years old at the beginning, is introduced as a budding basketball player with musical aspirations. William is battling a brain tumor while caring for his own young son. The family household also becomes a creative hub—Quest runs “Freestyle Fridays” in their basement recording studio, giving neighborhood youth an outlet for music and self-expression.

Interwoven through daily routines—braiding hair, school bus walks, family meals—the film stakes its emotional core in the small, tender moments. Political and social currents anchor the timeline: Obama’s re-election, Sandy Hook, Hurricane Sandy, and later Trump’s campaign address the family directly. A sudden neighborhood tragedy—P.J. being struck by stray gunfire—marks a painful turning point that the family endures with quiet resilience.

Through the unfolding years and challenges, *Quest* reveals both the fragility and strength embedded in the Raineys’ family life and their tight-knit—but beleaguered—community.

== Release ==
Quest premiered on January 22, 2017 at the Sundance Film Festival. It was also screened at the True/False Film Festival and the Zurich Film Festival, among others. It was released theatrically on December 8, 2017. After its theatrical release, it was aired on the PBS show POV.

=== Critical response ===
Quest was met with positive reviews from critics during its festival screenings. Guy Lodge of Variety gave the film a positive review, writing that director Olshefski and editor Utz "beautifully [carve] out a film that feels at once narratively firm and organically shaped from over 300 hours of footage across the years". Brian Tallerico, writing for RogerEbert.com, wrote that Quest "transcends that simple set-up to feel like something greater through the marvelous likability and relatability of the Raineys".

On review aggregator website Rotten Tomatoes, the film has an approval rating of 98% based on 61 reviews, and an average rating of 7.88/10. The website's critical consensus reads, "Simultaneously sweeping and intimate, Quest uses one family's experiences to offer trenchant, wide-ranging observations about modern American life." On Metacritic, the film has a weighted average score of 88 out of 100, based on 18 critics.

Quest was nominated for the 2018 Independent Spirit Award for Best Documentary Feature. After airing on television, Quest was nominated for the 2019 News and Documentary Emmy Award for Outstanding Documentary and Outstanding Social Issue Documentary.
