= Barbara Smith Conrad =

American opera singer

- Born: Barbara Louise Smith; August 11, 1937; Atlanta, Texas, U.S.
- Died: May 22, 2017 (aged 79); Edison, New Jersey, U.S.
- Education: The University of Texas at Austin
- Occupations: Singer, educator
- Website: www.whenirisefilm.com

Barbara Smith Conrad (August 11, 1937 – May 22, 2017) was an American opera singer. A mezzo-soprano, she performed with the Metropolitan Opera, Vienna State Opera, Teatro Nacional in Venezuela, and many others. She was also an educator, co-directing the Wagner Theater Program, which she co-founded, and maintaining a private studio as well as taking up multiple artist residencies.

Conrad received national attention when, in 1957, her work as a student performer became central in a racial controversy. Cast in a role opposite a white performer, the African-American Conrad was removed from the role at The University of Texas at Austin as a result of pressure on school administration from the Texas Legislature.

Conrad's life has been depicted in the film When I Rise (2011).

== Early years ==
Born Barbara Louise Smith, the youngest of five children, she was raised in Center Point near Pittsburg, Texas. She was interested in music from early childhood, performing with her siblings in their Baptist church. She entered the University of Texas at Austin in 1956 as one of the first class of African-American undergraduates. The following year, she was cast in the role of Dido, Queen of Carthage, in the student production of Dido and Aeneas. Controversy among the student body and fear of bad publicity over her romantic pairing in the role with a white student led Joseph Norwin "Joe" Chapman of the Texas Legislature to advise the university's president to intervene, and the part was taken away from Conrad two weeks before the opera was set to open. Local and student media protested the decision, as did eight other legislators in Texas, and the story was picked up by Time. The national coverage of the controversy and decision led popular singer Harry Belafonte to offer to pay Conrad's way at any institution she chose. Conrad, who had advocated for integration of the University of Texas, elected to remain there despite losing the role and graduated with a Bachelor of Music in 1959. She adopted her father's first name, Conrad, as her stage name when she joined the Equity entertainment labor union because another Barbara Smith was already registered.

== Career ==
Although Conrad did not take up Belafonte's offer to change schools, expenses paid, she benefited from his patronage after graduation, when he introduced her to his circles in New York. Her expenses were paid by Eleanor Roosevelt, who had also learned of Conrad through the controversy surrounding the mixed-racial pairing of her role. It began a long career for Conrad, who performed leading roles with many opera companies internationally, including among others the Metropolitan Opera, the Vienna State Opera, Teatro Nacional in Venezuela, Houston Grand Opera, New York City Opera, and Pittsburgh Opera. She played a featured role in the 1977 ABC movie Eleanor and Franklin: The White House Years as American contralto Marian Anderson. She also performed alongside orchestras such as the New York Philharmonic and the London, Boston, Cleveland, and Detroit symphonies and performed by invitation at both the White House in 1987 and for Pope John Paul II in New York City in 1995.

As an educator, Conrad established a private studio, as well as offering artist residencies and master classes. She was a co-founder of the Wagner Theater Program at the Manhattan School of Music, dedicated to training performers for Wagnerian roles, and served as its vocal director.

The University of Texas offers a scholarship in the name of Conrad, whom they named a distinguished alumna in 1985.

== Death ==
On May 22, 2017, Conrad died in Edison, New Jersey at the age of 79 from complications related to Alzheimer's disease. On June 11, 2017, Conrad was buried in the Texas State Cemetery in Austin, Texas.

== Legacy ==
As part of his tribute to Conrad, University of Texas at Austin President Gregory L. Fenves stated that “Barbara Conrad was a trailblazer — from her Precursor days at UT in 1956 and throughout her distinguished opera career,” and that "Her accomplishments and tenacity represent an important chapter in the university’s history. We will miss her talents and presence on the Forty Acres and beyond." Opera Wire journalist Katharine Baran paid tribute by acknowledging, among other things, Conrad's esteemed career in New York City. Braun stating that "Conrad, an acclaimed mezzo-soprano, sang at the most esteemed stages across the globe, from New York’s Metropolitan Opera to the Vienna State Opera" and that "By 1965, Conrad was appearing with the New York City Opera in the lead female role of George Gershwin's "Porgy and Bess” and in 1985 she appeared at the Met’s company premiere of “Porgy and Bess” and returned to that opera house often in her career."

=== When I Rise ===
Conrad is the focus of the feature-length documentary When I Rise, produced by James Moll and Michael Rosen and directed by Mat Hames. Don Carleton, executive director of UT Austin's Briscoe Center for American History, was the film's executive producer. The documentary was aired on PBS in 2011.

Festivals:
- WORLD PREMIERE: South by Southwest Film Festival, Austin, Texas (March 2010)
- Dallas International Film Festival, Dallas, Texas (April 2010)
- Hot Docs Canadian International Documentary Festival, Toronto, Canada (May 2010)
- Indianapolis International Film Festival (July 2010)
- New York City International Film Festival (August 2010)
- New Orleans Film Festival (October 2010)
- Starz Denver Film Festival (November 2010)
- Santa Barbara International Film Festival (January 2011)
- San Diego Black Film Festival (January 2011)

Awards and nominations:
- Winner: Audience Award Feature - Indianapolis International Film Festival
- Winner: Black Expressions Award - Indianapolis International Film Festival
- Nominee: Music Documentary Award – International Documentary Awards (IDA)
- Winner: Social Justice Award for Documentary Film - The Fund for Santa Barbara (Santa Barbara International Film Festival)

== Awards and honors ==
- 1985: Distinguished Alumnus Award - The Ex-Students' Association of The University of Texas
- 1986: Barbara Smith Conrad Endowed Presidential Scholarship in Fine Arts, at The University of Texas at Austin
- 2009: Texas House of Representatives passes a Resolution to Honor Barbara Smith Conrad:
- 2011: Texas Medal of Arts Awards – Lifetime Achievement
- 2013: Life Time Achievement Award, National Black History Month in Palm Springs, CA.
