= Erika Cohn =

American film producer

Erika Cohn is an American movie director and producer. Cohn is a Emmy and Peabody recipient. She is also the founder of the Idle Wild Films, Inc. Company.

== Education ==
She attended Chapman University and Hebrew University and earned degrees in Film Production, Middle Eastern studies, and Acting Performance. Erika is also a photographer and a U.S. Ambassadorial Film Scholar in Israel and Palestine.

== Filmography ==
- When the Voices Fade (2006)
- Giant Steps (2008)
- La Guerrera (2008)
- God in America (2010)
- In Football We Trust (2015)
- The Judge (2017)
- Belly of the Beast (2020)

== Awards and fellowships ==
Cohn and her films have been awarded Emmy and Peabody awards. She was awarded a Directors Guild of America award for When the Voices Fade. She was recognized by Variety as a leading documentary filmmaker "to watch in 2017." She was listed in Doc NYC's "40 Under 40" list for 2019. Her "Win from Within" series for Gatorade was nominated 2016 Webby award. In 2016 she was a National MediaMaker Fellow and was admitted to the CPB Producer's Academy. In 2017 she was a Rauschenberg Foundation Artist as Activist Fellow.
