= Get the Fire =

- Directed by: Nancy du Plessis
- Release date: December 2003
- Running time: 60 minutes

Get the Fire: Young Mormon Missionaries Abroad is a United States PBS-sponsored documentary, by the independent filmmaker Nancy du Plessis. It examines the experiences of some Mormon missionaries who questioned their religious beliefs after serving their missions. It premiered in December 2003 and was 60 minutes long.

Some Mormon missionaries, including those serving missions in a foreign culture, may begin to question their religious upbringing and belief system. Get the Fire follows three LDS missionaries during their two-year missions in Germany. The documentary opens with the three future missionaries at their respective homes prior to knowing where they will serve. Surrounded by their family, each boy opens a mission call informing them they will serve in the Munich, Germany mission. The documentary follows them along the full two years of their mission from the Missionary Training Center until they leave the mission and return home. The film shows missionaries proselyting in public squares, knocking door to door, struggling with a foreign language, congregating in zone and district meetings, and meeting with the mission president. Topics covered include missionary slang, leaving a girlfriend at home, missionary morale, and relationships with family at home. The three missionaries appear to remain dedicated and faithful to their mission in the film.

The documentary juxtaposes the sanguine views of the missionaries in Germany with interviews of former missionaries who have left the church. These interviews present a look at the experience of both young American and foreign-born Mormon missionaries and explore issues they have with the church. As these changed Mormon missionaries struggle to reconcile their intense, religious experience with a new outlook on life, they realize their perceptions about black and white, dogmatic thinking have changed.
