= Belly of the Beast (2020 film) =

- Film poster
- Directed by: Erika Cohn
- Music by: Omar Fadel
- Release date: June 11, 2020 (HRW)
- Running time: 82 minutes
- Country: United States
- Language: English

Belly of the Beast is a 2020 documentary film by Erika Cohn about the illegal sterilization practices in the Central California Women’s Facility and other female penitentiaries. Made over a period of seven years, the 82-minute movie documents the fight of one inmate (Kelli Dillon) and her lawyer against the Department of Corrections.

Their investigations inside prison, with assistance from outside allies, uncover statewide criminal practices ranging from poor healthcare, sexual abuse and assault, coercive sterilizations, and the targeting of women of color.

The film was supported by the Tribeca Film Institute through the Gucci Tribeca Documentary Fund (2015), the TFI Network (2017), and the TFI Pond5 Program (Spring 2019). 20% of proceeds from the film went to support the Women and Justice Project.

== Reception ==
It was the Opening Night Film at the Human Rights Watch Film Festival in 2020 and was named a New York Times Critic's Pick. The Washington Post listed the film as "a movie to stream" in October 2020. It was in the American Library Association's 2022 list of Notable Films for Adults. On Rotten Tomatoes, the film has an aggregated score of 100% based on 17 critic reviews, and 83% based on general audience reviews.
