= Mat Hames =

American independent filmmaker (born 1971)

Mat Hames is an American independent filmmaker known for the PBS documentary series Power Trip: the Story of Energy, as well as his two Independent Lens documentaries When I Rise and What Was Ours. He was knighted by King Albert II for his documentary film about Belgian Resistance escape lines in World War II Last Best Hope.
