= Mama Bears =

- Official release poster
- Directed by: Daresha Kyi
- Produced by: Daresha Kyi; Laura Tatham
- Cinematography: Amy Bench
- Edited by: Hajer S. I. Salem; Kelly Creedon
- Music by: Gil Talmi
- Production company: Mama Bears Documentary LLC
- Distributed by: PBS (Independent Lens)
- Release date: 2022
- Running time: 91 minutes
- Country: United States
- Language: English

Mama Bears is a 2022 American documentary film directed by Daresha Kyi. The film follows a network of conservative Christian mothers who become advocates for LGBTQ rights after supporting and affirming their LGBTQ children.

The documentary premiered at South by Southwest in 2022 and later aired nationally on PBS as part of the documentary series Independent Lens on June 20, 2023.

== Synopsis ==
The film documents the experiences of conservative Christian mothers who refer to themselves as “mama bears” because of their advocacy on behalf of the LGBTQ community. Through the stories of Sara Cunningham, Kimberly Shappley, two "mama bears," and Tammi Terrell Morris, a young African American lesbian, the documentary examines the tensions between religious belief, family relationships, and LGBTQ acceptance.

The film also explores the growth of the Mama Bears support network and organizations such as Free Mom Hugs, which advocate for LGBTQ youth and families.

== Production ==
Director/producer Daresha Kyi began developing the project after learning about the Mama Bears support network through media coverage involving Kimberly Shappley and her transgender daughter Kai.

The film received support from organizations including the International Documentary Association, ITVS, Chicken & Egg Pictures, and the Southern Documentary Fund.

Kyi has stated that the film was intended to encourage dialogue around LGBTQ acceptance within conservative Christian communities.

== Release ==
Mama Bears premiered at South by Southwest in March 2022.

The film screened at over 100 film festivals including the Full Frame Documentary Film Festival, and The Seattle International Film Festival, was part of the Southern Circuit Tour of Independent Filmmakers community screening series and on the streaming platform Kinema.

The documentary was broadcast nationally on PBS through Independent Lens in June 2023.

== Reception ==
The Hollywood Reporter described the three families in Mama Bears as providing "a kaleidoscopic lens for understanding the tensions between faith, gender and sexuality."

Writing for Collider, Therese Lacson described the film as a “touching documentary” examining parents who evolve toward acceptance and advocacy for LGBTQ communities.

Review aggregator website Rotten Tomatoes reports an approval rating of 87% based on critic reviews.
