= They Call Us Monsters =

They Call Us Monsters is a 2016 American documentary directed and produced by Ben Lear. The film documents the experience of three juveniles: Juan Gamez, Antonio Hernandez and Jarad Nava. The teenagers participate in a screenwriting class at Barry J. Nidorf Juvenile Hall in Los Angeles, California, with producer Gabriel Cowan.

== Premise ==
The documentary follows three young juvenile offenders who signed up for a screenwriting class with producer Gabriel Cowan as they await their respective trials in Los Angeles County. Arrested at 16, Jarad faces 200 years-to-life for four attempted murders; Juan, also arrested at 16, faces 90-to-life for first-degree murder; Antonio was arrested at 14 and faces 90-to-life for two attempted murders.
