= Soul Food Junkies =

2012 documentary film

- Directed by: Byron Hurt
- Produced by: Lisa Durden
- Distributed by: PBS
- Release date: 2012
- Country: United States

Soul Food Junkies is a 2012 documentary directed by Byron Hurt and produced by Lisa Durden. The film explores the history and culinary tradition of soul food, and its relevance to African-American culture and identity. The film also documents black people that have modified their diet towards eating more vegetables.

== Critical reception ==
HuffPost said "At its core, Soul Food Junkies succeeds in doing precisely what it calls for: to make healthy food part of popular culture. Byron Hurt isn't ready to abandon Soul Food. He just wants it to be healthier. He is not alone, and he has taken the debate on food to another level."

NPR wrote "Director Byron Hurt's highly personal, often funny film explores how traditional Southern comfort fare became entwined with African-American identity.

== See also ==
- List of films about food and drink
