= Byron Hurt =

American film director (born 1969)

- Born: Byron Patrick Hurt; 1969 (age 56–57); United States
- Education: Northeastern University
- Spouse: Kenya Felice Crumel (m. 2006)
- Website: bhurt.com

Byron Patrick Hurt (born 1969) is an American activist, lecturer, writer, and award-winning documentary filmmaker.

== Biography ==
Byron Hurt attended Northeastern University to study journalism. While attending Northeastern, Hurt played football as a quarterback, and founded God Bless the Child Productions before graduating in 1993.

Upon graduation he was hired by the university's Center for the Study of Sport in Society to help form the Mentors in Violence Prevention (MVP) program with the purpose of educating young black men about gender and sexual violence. This experience led Hurt to produce and direct the documentary I Am A Man: Black Masculinity in America. Hurt is also the former associate director of the United States Marine Corps gender violence prevention program.

In 2010, he hosted the Emmy-nominated television show, Reel Works with Byron Hurt. His documentary Hip-Hop: Beyond Beats and Rhymes premiered at the 2006 Sundance Film Festival and broadcast nationally on PBS in 2007. His film Soul Food Junkies received the Best Documentary Award at the 2012 American Black Film Festival and aired on PBS' Independent Lens in January 2013.

In 2022, he released a documentary on Hazing, exploring the culture of hazing following the tragic hazing deaths of young people.

== Personal life ==
On September 30, 2006, Byron Hurt married Kenya Felice Crumel at their home in Plainfield, New Jersey.

== Filmography ==
- Moving Memories: The Black Senior Video Yearbook
- I Am A Man: Black Masculinity in America
- Hip-Hop: Beyond Beats and Rhymes
- Barack & Curtis: Manhood, Power, & Respect
- Soul Food Junkies
