= Independent Lens =

Television documentary film series (began 1999)

- Genre: Documentary
- Country of origin: United States
- No. of seasons: 28
- No. of episodes: 405 (list of episodes)

Production
- Executive producers: Lois Vossen, Royd Chung
- Running time: 60-120 minutes or multi-part docuseries
- Production company: Independent Television Service

Original release
- Network: PBS
- Release: August 9, 1999 – present

Independent Lens is a weekly television series airing on PBS featuring documentary films made by independent filmmakers. Past seasons of Independent Lens were hosted by Angela Bassett, Don Cheadle, Susan Sarandon, Edie Falco, Terrence Howard, Maggie Gyllenhaal, America Ferrera, Mary-Louise Parker, and Stanley Tucci, who served two stints as host from 2012-2014.

The series began in 1999 and for three years aired 10 episodes each fall season. In 2002, PBS announced that the series would relaunch the following year with ITVS as the production company, under the leadership of Sally Jo Fifer and Lois Vossen, and would expand to 29 primetime episodes a year. The 2025-2026 season is regarded as the 27th season for the series.

Independent Lens has won six Primetime Emmy Awards and 20 films have won News & Documentary Emmy Awards. In 2012, "Have You Heard From Johannesburg?" won for Exceptional Merit in Documentary Filmmaking; in 2007, A Lion in the House won for Exceptional Merit in Nonfiction Filmmaking; and A Lion's Trail won in 2006 for Outstanding Cultural and Artistic Programming. Three other films won for Best Documentary: Billy Strayhorn: Lush Life in 2008, Be Good, Smile Pretty in 2004, and Sing Faster: The Stagehands' Ring Cycle in 2000. Four Independent Lens films won News & Documentary Emmys in 2017 alone: The Armor of Light; (T)error; Best of Enemies; and In Football We Trust. As well, seven Independent Lens films garnered Academy Award nominations for Best Documentary: Enron: The Smartest Guys in the Room (2006), The Weather Underground (2004), Waste Land (2010), Hell and Back Again (2011), How to Survive a Plague (2012), I Am Not Your Negro (2016), and Hale County This Morning, This Evening (2018). Other awards conferred upon Independent Lens films include the George Foster Peabody Award, International Documentary Association Documentary Awards, Alfred I. duPont–Columbia University Award, and Sundance Film Festival Awards.

== Audience Award ==
Independent Lens previously gave out an annual Audience Award. The TV viewing audience was invited to rate each episode of the series (through online voting), and an award was given to each season's winner. Winners of the Audience Award have included:

- 2003 Heart of the Sea
- 2004 Jimmy Scott: If You Only Knew
- 2005 On a Roll
- 2006 The Devil's Miner
- 2007 China Blue
- 2008 Na Kamalei: The Men of Hula
- 2009 Adjust Your Color: The Truth of Petey Greene
- 2010 Mine
- 2011 Two Spirits
- 2012 Strong! and Have You Heard from Johannesburg?
- 2013 The Revisionaries
- 2014 Don't Stop Believin': Everyman's Journey
- 2015 Kumu Hina
- 2016 Trapped
- 2017 They Call Us Monsters
- 2018 Unrest
- 2019 Out of State

== Critical reception ==
Independent Lens has received generally positive reviews from television critics. David Zurawik of The Baltimore Sun called the series "one of the nation’s finest and most daring producers of documentaries."
