= Howard Nathan =

American basketball player (1972–2019)

Personal information
- Born: January 21, 1972 Peoria, Illinois, U.S.
- Died: July 28, 2019 (aged 47) Peoria, Illinois, U.S.
- Listed height: 5 ft 11 in (1.80 m)
- Listed weight: 175 lb (79 kg)

Career information
- High school: Manual (Peoria, Illinois)
- College: DePaul (1991–1992); Louisiana–Monroe (1993–1994); Northwest Arkansas CC (1994–1995)
- NBA draft: 1995: undrafted
- Playing career: 1995–1999
- Position: Point guard
- Number: 14
- Coaching career: 2014–2017

Career history

Playing
- 1995: Omaha Racers
- 1995–1996: Atlanta Hawks
- 1998–1999: Rockford Lightning

Coaching
- 2014–2017: Manual HS (assistant)

Career highlights
- McDonald's All-American (1991); Second-team Parade All-American (1991); Illinois Mr. Basketball (1991)

Career NBA statistics
- Points: 13
- Steals: 3
- Assists: 2
- Stats at NBA.com
- Stats at Basketball Reference

Howard Nathan Jr. (January 21, 1972 – July 28, 2019) was an American professional basketball player. Born in Peoria, Illinois, Nathan attended DePaul University, Northeast Louisiana University (now University of Louisiana at Monroe) and Northwest Arkansas Community College. He played 5 games during the 1995–96 NBA season with the Atlanta Hawks, averaging 2.6 points and 0.4 assists per game.

Nathan attended Manual High School in Peoria and was named Illinois Mr. Basketball in 1991. He appears in the 1994 documentary film Hoop Dreams as the victor of Arthur Agee's John Marshall Metropolitan High School Commandos in the 1991 Illinois high school basketball championship tournament. Shaun Livingston called Nathan "the greatest player to come out of Peoria at the high school level."

Nathan was paralyzed after an allegedly drunk driver drove into his Oldsmobile in Peoria on July 30, 2006. He returned to Manual High School as an assistant coach from 2014 to 2017. On July 9, 2019, Nathan's heart stopped twice after he collapsed in his Peoria home. He was taken to OSF Saint Francis Medical Center where he died on July 28, 2019, at the age of 47.

On February 6, 2020, the area where Nathan grew up on the corner of Madison Park Terrace and Proctor Street in Peoria was honored as "Howard Nathan Jr. Court".
