= Glynn Watson Jr. =

American basketball player (born 1997)

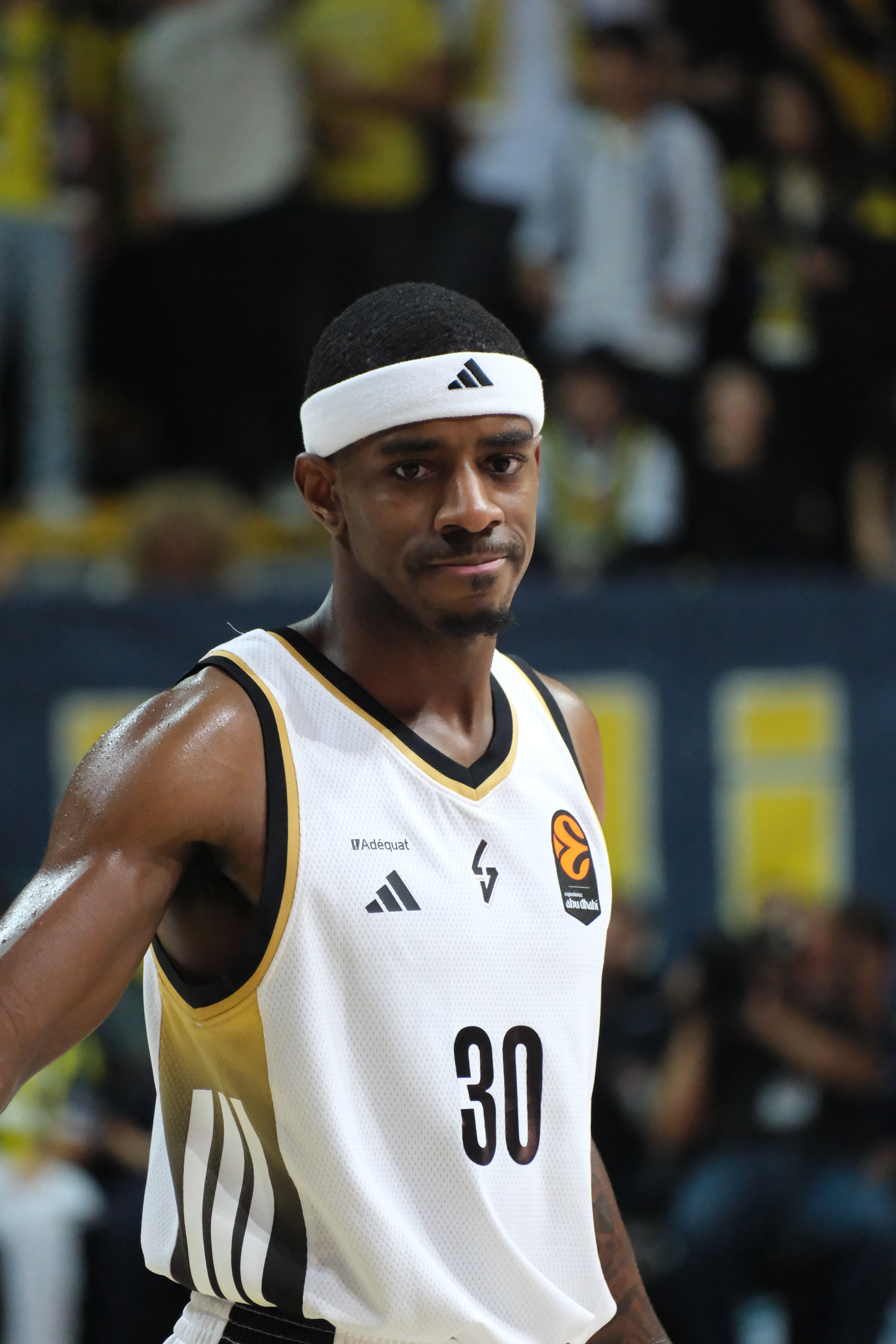
- Watson with ASVEL Basket in 2025

No. 30 – Umana Reyer Venezia
- Position: Point guard
- League: LBA; EuroCup

Personal information
- Born: March 9, 1997 (age 29) Chicago, Illinois, U.S.
- Listed height: 6 ft 0 in (1.83 m)
- Listed weight: 180 lb (82 kg)

Career information
- High school: St. Joseph (Westchester, Illinois)
- College: Nebraska (2015–2019)
- NBA draft: 2019: undrafted
- Playing career: 2019–present

Career history
- 2019–2020: Lavrio
- 2021: Kolossos Rodou
- 2021–2022: Þór Þorlákshöfn
- 2022: Trefl Sopot
- 2022–2023: Jonava
- 2023–2024: Telekom Baskets Bonn
- 2024–2025: BCM Gravelines-Dunkerque
- 2025–2026: ASVEL
- 2026–present: Reyer Venezia

Career highlights
- Icelandic Super Cup winner (2021)

Glynn Juwan Watson Jr. (born March 9, 1997) is an American professional basketball player for Reyer Venezia of the Italian Lega Basket Serie A (LBA) and the EuroCup. He played four years of college basketball with the Nebraska Cornhuskers of the Big Ten Conference. A consensus top 100 recruit out of high school, Watson became Nebraska's first four-star and Rivals Top 150 signee in program history.

== High school career ==
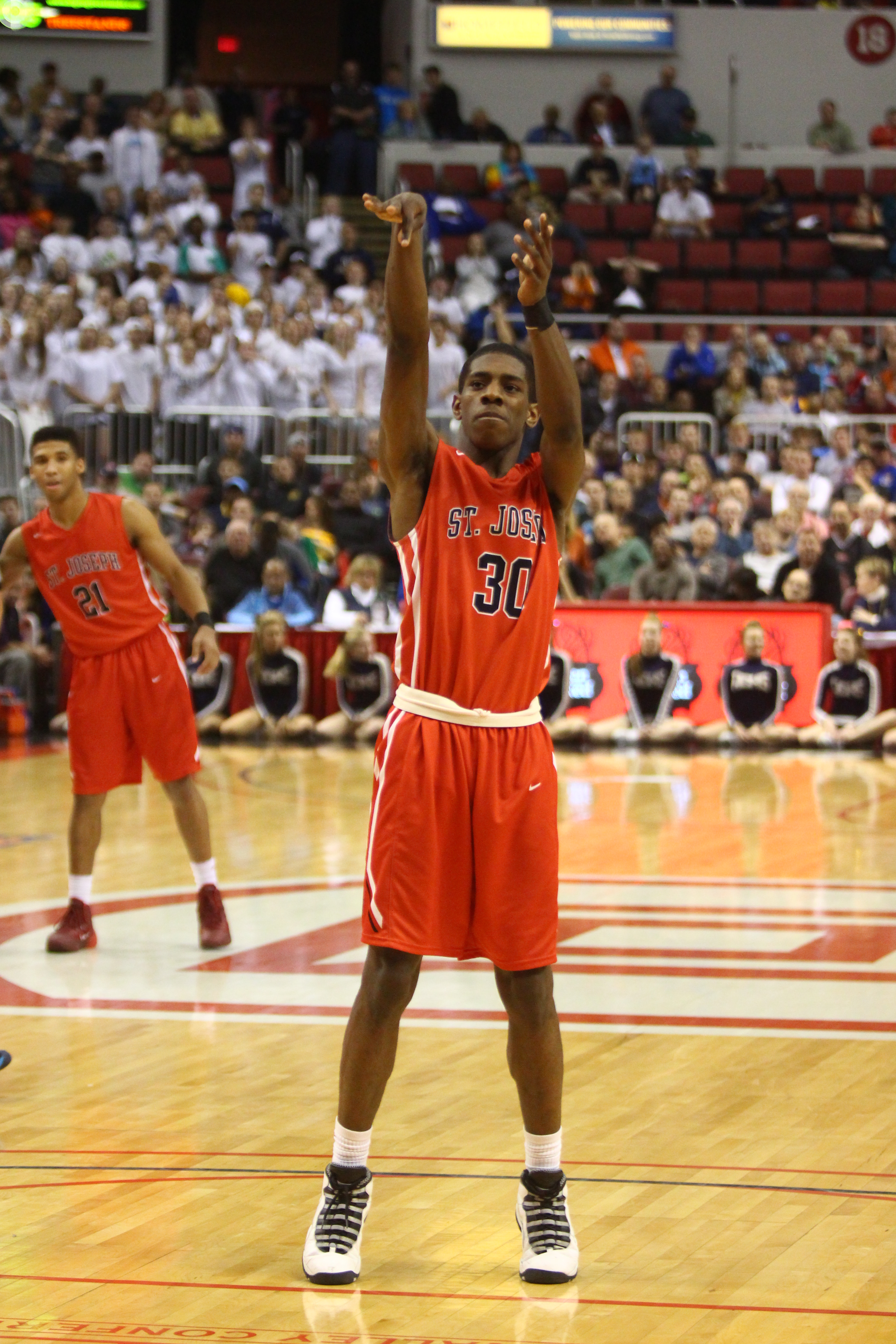
Watson at the line in the 2015 IHSA 3A championship game victory

Watson played for legendary high school coach Gene Pingatore at St. Joseph High School in Westchester, Illinois. As a senior, he averaged 15.5 points, 4.3 rebounds, 4.0 assists, and 3.0 steals per game in leading the Chargers to a 29–6 record and the school's second state title. In all, Watson had nine games of at least 20 points as a senior. For his efforts, he earned first-team all-state honors from the Illinois Basketball Coaches Association and Champaign News-Gazette in 2015. In addition, Watson was a second-team choice by the Chicago Tribune (all classes) and Chicago Sun Times (Class 3A). Watson played summer ball for the Illinois Wolves, one of the top AAU teams in the region.

== Recruitment ==
A consensus four-star prospect, Watson was ranked among the top 100 players in the country by every recruiting service and was ranked as high as 66 nationally by Scout.com, which also ranked him as the seventh-best point guard in the class of 2015, and No. 73 on ESPN.com’s top-100 seniors. He received offers from Creighton, DePaul, Iowa, Marquette, Maryland, Nebraska, Penn State, Purdue, Tennessee, and West Virginia. Watson committed to Nebraska on August 31, 2014, two days after taking his first and only official visit to Nebraska.

College recruiting
Name	Hometown	School	Height	Weight	Commit date
Glynn Watson Jr. PG	Bellwood, IL	Saint Joseph High School	5 ft 11 in (1.80 m)	160 lb (73 kg)	Aug 31, 2014
Glynn Watson Jr. PG	Recruit ratings: Scout: Rivals: 247Sports: (84)				
Overall recruit ranking: Scout: 66, 7 (PG) Rivals: 82, 12 (PG) ESPN: 73, 10 (PG)
Note: In many cases, Scout, Rivals, 247Sports, On3, and ESPN may conflict in their listings of height and weight.; In these cases, the average was taken. ESPN grades are on a 100-point scale.; Sources: "2015 Nebraska Basketball Commitment List". Rivals.; "Men's Basketball Recruiting". Scout.; "ESPN – Nebraska Cornhuskers Basketball Recruiting 2015". ESPN.; "Scout.com Team Recruiting Rankings". Scout.; "2015 Team Ranking". Rivals.

== College career ==
=== Freshman year ===
Watson started the 2015–2016 season coming off the bench for the Cornhuskers. In his collegiate debut, Watson played 22 minutes, tallying six points, three rebounds, three assists, and two steals in Nebraska's victory over Mississippi Valley State. On December 1, 2015, in his eighth collegiate game, Watson hit a game-tying three-pointer with 18.9 seconds left to send the Cornhuskers and then 21st ranked Miami (FL) to overtime. On December 13, 2015, Watson scored 13 of his career-high 17 points in the second half to lead the Cornhuskers back from an 11-point deficit to defeat Rhode Island. Watson made his first career start on December 22, 2015 against Prairie View A&M and has been a fixture in the Cornhuskers' starting lineup since. The Illinois native reached double figures in six of his first 11 conference games, including an impressive 17 point performance in Nebraska's victory at Illinois. On February 15, 2016, Watson was named Big Ten Conference Freshman of the Week, becoming the first Cornhusker to win the award since Shavon Shields in February 2013.

=== Sophomore year ===
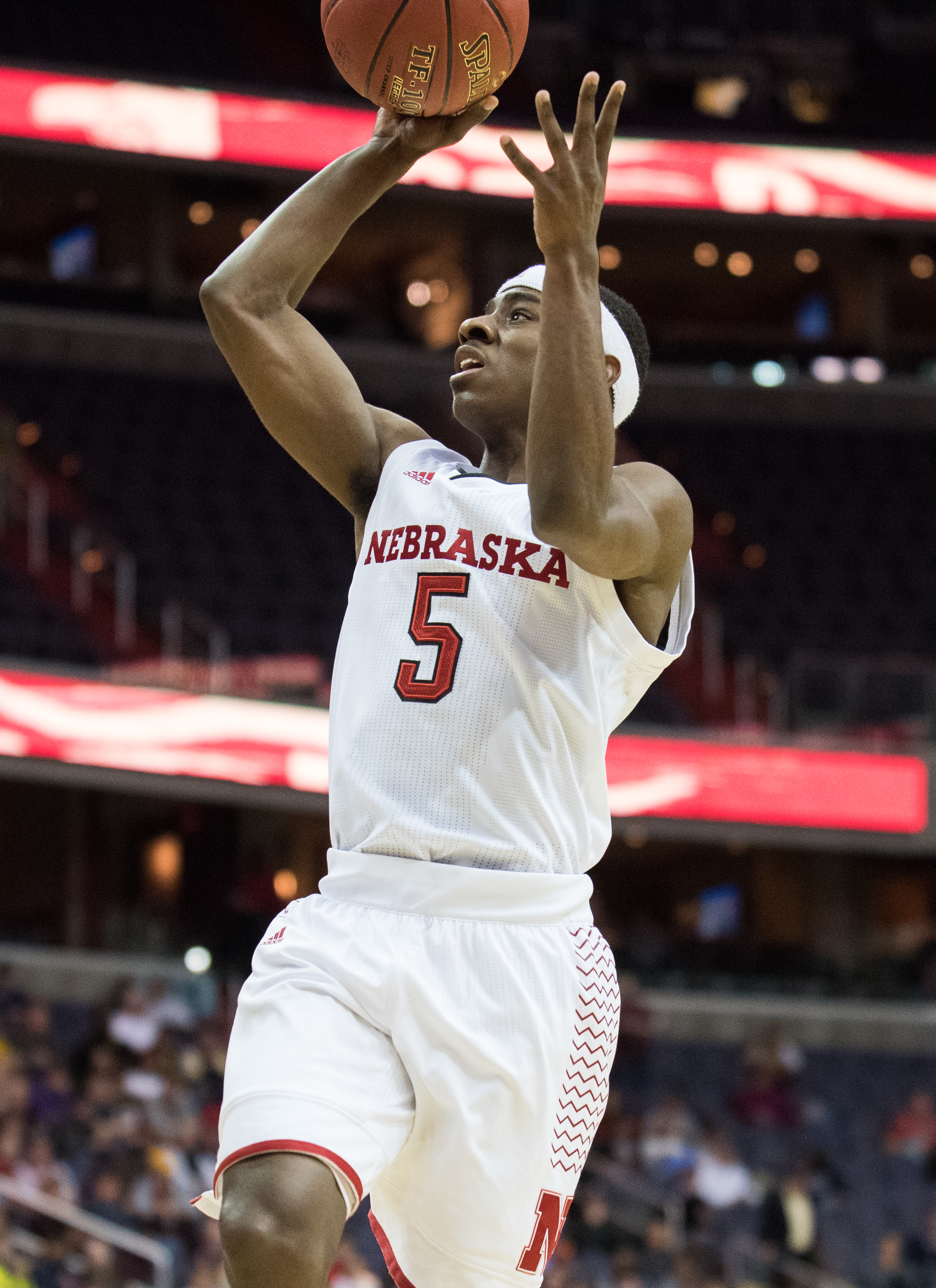
Watson in March 2017

Watson opened the 2016–2017 season with a career high 23 points in the Cornhuskers 83–61 victory over Sacramento State. As a sophomore, Watson averaged 13 points, 3.0 rebounds, and 2.6 assists per game.

=== Junior year ===
As a junior, Watson averaged 10.5 points and 3.2 assists per game.

=== Senior year ===
As a senior, Watson averaged 13.6 points, 4.1 rebounds, and 3.1 assists per game. He helped Nebraska reach its second straight NIT. He had five 20-point games and averaged 18.9 points per game in his final nine games. Watson finished his career with 1,532 points, 11th in program history. After the season, he participated in the 2019 Dos Equis 3X3U National Championship.

== Professional career ==
=== Lavrio (2019–2020) ===
After going undrafted in the 2019 NBA draft, Watson Jr. signed his first professional contract overseas with Lavrio of the Greek Basket League, on August 9, 2019. In 20 games, he averaged 8.0 points, 1.7 rebounds, and 1.8 assists.

=== Kolossos Rodou (2021) ===
On February 16, 2021, Watson signed with another Greek Basket League club, Kolossos Rodou, replacing Ty Lawson. In 8 games, he averaged 8.0 points, 2.6 rebounds and 2.0 assists per game.

=== Þór Þorlákshöfn (2021–2022) ===
In August 2021, Watson signed with reigning Icelandic champions Þór Þorlákshöfn. On 2 October 2021, he had 16 points, 11 rebounds and 8 assists in Þór's 113–100 win against Njarðvík in the Icelandic Super Cup.

=== Trefl Sopot (2022) ===
On August 16, 2022, Watson signed with Trefl Sopot of the Polish Basketball League (PLK). On December 21, he left the club on a mutual agreement.

=== CBet Jonava (2022–2023) ===
On December 22, 2022, Watson signed with CBet Jonava of the Lithuanian Basketball League (LKL).

=== Telekom Baskets Bonn (2023–2024) ===
In August, 2023, Watson signed with the Telekom Baskets Bonn of the German Basketball Bundesliga (BBL).

=== BCM Gravelines–Dunkerque (2024–2025) ===
On July 30, 2024, Watson was announced to have signed with BCM Gravelines-Dunkerque of the LNB Élite.

=== ASVEL (2025–2026) ===
On August 10, 2025, Watson signed with LDLC ASVEL of the LNB Élite and the EuroLeague.

=== Reyer Venezia (2026–present) ===
On July 2, 2026, Watson signed with Reyer Venezia of the Italian Lega Basket Serie A (LBA).

== Career statistics ==
Legend
GP	Games played	GS	Games started	MPG	Minutes per game
FG%	Field goal percentage	3P%	3-point field goal percentage	FT%	Free throw percentage
RPG	Rebounds per game	APG	Assists per game	SPG	Steals per game
BPG	Blocks per game	PPG	Points per game	**Bold**	Career high

=== College ===
Year	Team	GP	GS	MPG	FG%	3P%	FT%	RPG	APG	SPG	BPG	PPG
2015–16	Nebraska	34	16	24.3	.389	.267	.792	1.9	2.4	1.2	.1	8.6
2016–17	Nebraska	31	29	31.6	**.417**	**.397**	**.810**	3.0	2.6	**1.6**	.1	13.0
2017–18	Nebraska	33	32	29.7	.347	.291	.780	3.3	**3.2**	1.4	**.2**	10.5
2018–19	Nebraska	**36**	**36**	**34.5**	.414	.383	.791	**4.1**	3.1	1.1	.1	**13.6**
Career		134	113	30.1	.393	.349	.793	3.1	2.9	1.3	.1	11.4

== Personal life ==
Watson is the son of Sabrina Watson and Glynn Watson Sr. He has two older brothers (DeAndre and Demetri McCamey) and two sisters (Kiera and Monique). Older brothers DeAndre and Demetri both also starred at St. Joseph High School. Demetri was a three-time All-Big Ten pick at the University of Illinois, earning first-team honors in 2009–10.

St. Joseph High School had the distinction of being the only school which had produced a pair of 1,000-point scorers for Nebraska, as Clifford Scales (1988–91) and Carl Hayes (1990–92) both played for Coach Gene Pingatore. Scales and Hayes both scored 1,136 points at Nebraska and played major roles in the Huskers’ school-record 26-win team in 1990–91. Now St. Joseph High School can claim a trio of 1,000-point scorers for Nebraska. On February 13, 2018, Watson joined the club, going over 1,000 points for his career.
