= Madagascar, a Journey Diary =

- Directed by: Bastien Dubois
- Written by: Bastien Dubois
- Produced by: Ron Dyens; Aurélia Prévieu
- Edited by: Boubkar Benzabat
- Music by: Rabaza
- Release date: 2009
- Running time: 11 minutes
- Country: France
- Language: French

Madagascar, a Journey Diary is a 2009 11-minute French animated film. It was nominated for an Academy Award in 2011.

== Plot ==
Famadihana is an ancient Malagasy custom that means "the turning of the dead". A symbol of the importance of the worship of ancestors, and a chance to move the remains of ancestors from their first tomb to their final resting place, it is an occasion for festivities, dance and the sacrifice of zebus. The movie is filmed like the travel journey of a Western traveler in search of these customs. The pages turn, the drawings come to life, and the luxuriant landscapes of Madagascar appear one after another. The celebrations may commence.

== Awards ==
In January 2011, Madagascar, a Journey Diary was nominated for an Oscar for Best Animated Short. It selected at Sundance and Dawn Breakers International Film Festival in 2009.
