= Gene Pingatore =

American basketball player and coach (1936–2019)

Biographical details
- Born: October 25, 1936; Cicero, Illinois, U.S.
- Died: June 26, 2019 (aged 82); Westchester, Illinois, U.S.

Playing career
- 1954–1958: Loyola (CA)

Coaching career (HC unless noted)
- 1960–1968: St. Joseph HS (IL) (assistant)
- 1969–2019: St. Joseph HS (IL)

Head coaching record
- Overall: 1,035–383

Accomplishments and honors

Championships
- 2 Illinois state (1999–AA, 2015–3A)

Eugene Louis Pingatore (October 25, 1936 – June 26, 2019) was an American basketball coach who served as the head boys' basketball coach at St. Joseph High School in Westchester, Illinois, a suburb of Chicago. In 50 seasons as head coach at St. Joseph, he compiled a record of 1,035–383—the most wins of any Illinois high school basketball coach—and led his teams to two Illinois High School Boys Basketball Championships, in 1999 and 2015. In the late 1970s, Pingatore mentored Isiah Thomas, who went on to star in college basketball for the Indiana Hoosiers and in the National Basketball Association (NBA) for the Detroit Pistons. Pingatore was also featured in the 1994 documentary film Hoop Dreams, which followed the lives of William Gates and Arthur Agee, who played for Pingatore at St. Joseph.

Pingatore was born on October 25, 1936, in Cicero, Illinois. He attended Providence St. Mel School in the East Garfield Park area of Chicago, where he played on the school's basketball team, which won Chicago Catholic League and city championships in 1954. After high school, Pingatore went to Loyola University of Los Angeles—now known as Loyola Marymount University—where he played college basketball, lettering for the Loyola Lions from 1954 to 1958. Following his graduation from Loyola, Pingatore returned to the Chicago-area and was hired as freshman basketball coach at St. Joseph when the school opened in 1960. He succeeded Pat Callahan as head coach in 1969.

Pingatore died at his home, in Westchester, on June 26, 2019.
