= William J. Keester =

- Born: June 6, 1889; Chicago, Illinois, United States
- Died: September 14, 1967 (aged 78) Salisbury, Maryland, United States
- Allegiance: United States
- Branch: United States Coast Guard
- Service years: 1907–1949
- Rank: Rear admiral
- Conflicts: World War I; World War II
- Awards: Coast Guard Commendation Medal
- Alma mater: United States Coast Guard Academy

William J. Keester was a rear admiral in the United States Coast Guard.

== Biography ==
Keester was born on June 6, 1889, in Chicago, Illinois. He graduated from John Marshall Metropolitan High School in 1907. in 1916, he married Verna A. Short. Keester died on September 14, 1967, in Salisbury, Maryland.

== Career ==
Keester entered the School of Instruction of the Revenue Cutter Service in 1907. He received his commission in 1910 and was then assigned to the USRC Seminole.

In 1912, while serving aboard the USRC Manning, Keester took part in the rescue and relief of those effected by the eruption of Mount Katmai. He and his crew received a letter commendation from President William Howard Taft.

After serving aboard the USCGC Unalga (WPG-53) and the USRC Mackinac, the United States Revenue Cutter Service merged with the United States Life-Saving Service to form the Coast Guard in 1915. During World War I, he was assigned to the USRC Yamacraw In April 1917, Lt. Keester received a Secretarial Commendation for lifesaving efforts associated with the grounding of the tanker Louisiana off Ocean City, Maryland on March 4, 1917. <Secretary of the Treasury Special Order No.16, April 2, 1917>.

Following the war, Keester was stationed in Green Bay, Wisconsin. In 1923, he enrolled in the Naval War College. The following year, he was named Executive Officer of the USCGC Tampa (WPG-48). In 1926, Keester assumed command of the USS Jouett (DD-41). Afterwards, he was assigned to the Coast Guard Yard.

In 1930, Keester returned to the Yamacraw as Commanding Officer. During this time, he was awarded the Coast Guard Commendation Medal. He then commanded the USCGC Mendota (WHEC-69) from 1933 to 1934 and spent time assisting the United States Naval Observatory.

During World War II, Keester was Captain of the Port of Baltimore before being stationed in Washington, D.C., Palm Beach, Florida and St. Augustine, Florida. Afterwards, he served as Inspector in Chief of the Coast Guard until 1946, at which time he returned to the Coast Guard Yard as Commanding Officer. He remained there until his retirement in 1949.
