= Uncle Hathi =

Animated children's show

Uncle Haathi and his Friends — Creepy the Mischief Maker is an animated children's television show in India. The show was introduced in North America as a selection to the 2008 Dawn Breakers International Film Festival in Arizona, United States.

- Director: Shayam Lal
- Writer/Producer: Elham Mohajer
- Animators: Shyam Lal, R. K. Sudarshan, Anurag Singh, Devendra Singh, Abhishek Sing, Vineet Satulay
