= Tsehai Loves Learning =

Ethiopian children's television series

- Genre: Puppetry
- Created by: Bruktawit Tigabu; Shane Etzenhouser
- Opening theme: "Tsehai Memar Tewedalech" chant
- Ending theme: "Tsehai Memar Tewedalech" xylophone instrumental
- Country of origin: Ethiopia
- Original languages: Amharic (primarily); Oromo; Tigrinya

Production
- Producer: Whiz Kids Workshop
- Running time: 10–15 minutes

Original release
- Network: EBC; Amhara TV; MoE
- Release: 17 September 2006 – present

Tsehai Loves Learning (Amharic: ፀሀይ መማር ትወዳለች) is an Ethiopian children's television series produced by Whiz Kids Workshop which is owned by husband-and-wife Bruktawit Tigabu and Shane Etzenhouser. It premiered on 17 September 2006. The show's characters are a giraffe puppet and similar animated characters speaking the local language of Amharic, with translations into seven languages. It reaches an estimated 2,800,000 to 5,000,000 children. It was introduced to the US and Europe by the Dawn Breakers International Film Festival in 2008.

In June 2008, the show won the "Next Generation" prize at the Prix Jeunesse International. In October that year, the show won the Japan Prize International Contest for Educational Media's award for world's best educational pre-school media. It won two major awards in Asia.

== Premise ==
Centered around the titular character portrayed by giraffe sock, it was commissioned to support the Ministry of Education for 1st and 4th grade. The show reaches over five million children aged 3–10 each week.

Tsehai Loves Learning broadcast mainly on three networks. Initially it aired on EBC and on Amhara Television. The Ministry of Education channel is the mainstream network.

The show modelled American television series Sesame Street, in which the puppet could interact with backdrop environments and using letters, numbers and shapes. According to creator, it is used to help children's visual understanding and reading skills. By implementing traditional graphical art, it creates awareness of Ethiopian culture. Tsehai Loves Learning is the first Ethiopian television show to use puppets and animation. The show also offers awareness of subjects facing the country: child slaves and orphanages.

== Recognition ==
The show earned awards, including a 6,000 euro prize, and sponsorship by Australian Children's Television Foundation, BBC, Disney Germany, KRO, Nickelodeon International, and ZDF.

In June 2008, the show won the "Next Generation" prize at the Prix Jeunesse International, an awards ceremony aimed towards children's television. In October, the show won the Japan Prize International Contest for Educational Media's award for world's best educational pre-school media. It won two major awards in Asia.

According to Etzenhouser "the Prix Jeunesse prize recognized 'Tsehai Loves Learning' for its social impact as well as the quality of the production relative to its low budget. The Japan Prize focuses on the educational value of the content, so 'Tsehai' has now been recognized internationally for quality, social impact, and educational value."

UNESCO planned to support four programs. Private company Jolly Jus distributes DVDs.

=== Franchise ===
Tsehai Loves Learning
- Created by: Whiz Kids Workshop

Print publications
- Book(s): 33 English books; 24 health themed books; 18 supplementary books in Afaan Oromo; 18 supplementary books in Amharic
- Short stories: 30 Amharic books; 33 Afaan Oromo books
- Comics: 2

Official website
- www.tsehai.com
