= Arthur Agee =

American basketball player

Personal information
- Born: October 22, 1972 (age 54) Chicago, Illinois, U.S.
- Listed height: 6 ft 2 in (1.88 m)

Career information
- High school: Marshall (Chicago, Illinois)
- College: Mineral Area (1991–1993); Arkansas State (1993–1995)
- NBA draft: 1995: undrafted
- Playing career: 1995–1996
- Position: Guard

Career history
- 1995–1996: Winnipeg Cyclone

Arthur Agee Jr. (/ˈeɪdʒiː/; born October 22, 1972) is an American former professional basketball player. He was one of two Chicago-area basketball players whose lives were chronicled in the 1994 documentary Hoop Dreams. Agee played college basketball for the Arkansas State Red Wolves and professionally with the Winnipeg Cyclone of the International Basketball Association.

== Early life ==
Agee is the second child and first son of Arthur "Bo" Agee Sr. and Sheila Agee. During his younger years, he lived in the north side of the Chicago area near where William Gates, the other star of Hoop Dreams, lived. By the time the movie began filming, the Agees had moved to the West Garfield Park neighborhood, which remained Agee's home until his graduation. Upon graduation from grammar school in 1987, he was discovered by part-time, unofficial talent scout Earl Smith, who convinced the Agee family to send Agee to St. Joseph's High School, a private, predominantly white, suburban school.

== High school ==
In the fall of 1987, Agee began his freshman year at St. Joseph High School, the same school that Isiah Thomas, Agee's childhood hero, attended. Because the school was 90 minutes from his home, Agee awoke around 5:30 AM daily and took public transportation to reach his destination. Early in his high school career, when his parents were unable to pay the school's tuition payments, Agee left St. Joseph's and attended John Marshall High School, an inner-city school. In his senior year, he helped the Marshall Commandos win the 1991 Public League Championship and finish third in the state championship. Agee's high school was defeated by Manual High School that was led by future NBA player Howard Nathan.

== College and thereafter ==
After graduating from Marshall, Agee starred at Mineral Area College, and played for two years at Arkansas State on a scholarship. He is a member of Phi Beta Sigma. Although Agee played at a Division I school, he never achieved his dream of playing in the National Basketball Association.

In 1995, Agee joined the Winnipeg Cyclone of the International Basketball Association, playing only one season for the Cyclone. In 1996, Agee turned down a contract with the CBA's Connecticut Pride so that he could take a role in the film Passing Glory with Hoop Dreams director Steve James.

In 2004, he launched a Hoop Dreams clothing line with the slogan "Control Your Destiny". In 2021, Agee connected with his Hoop Dreams co-star William Gates and producer Matt Hoffar to launch The Hoop Dreams Podcast, in partnership with the Unlearning Network, a Vancouver-based media company.

On December 15, 2004, his father, Arthur "Bo" Agee Sr., was killed while attempting to run from at least one robber. A Chicago man was charged by Berwyn police, but acquitted of killing Arthur Agee Sr.

In 2007 Agee starred in the documentary film Hoop Reality.
