= St. Joseph High School (Westchester, Illinois) =

Location
- 10900 West Cermak Road; Westchester, Illinois 60154; United States; 41.849264°N 87.89341°W

Information
- Type: Private
- Motto: Vincit Qui Laborat (Victory Belongs to Those Who Work)
- Denomination: Roman Catholic
- Established: 1960
- Status: closed
- Closed: 2021
- Oversight: Archdiocese of Chicago
- Teaching staff: 26 (2020-2021)
- Grades: 9—12
- Gender: Coeducational
- Enrollment: Coed Peak: 887 (2008) Lowest: 185 (2020-2021)
- Campus type: suburban
- Colors: red white black
- Fight song: Charger Fight Song
- Athletics conference: Chicago Catholic League
- Mascot: Joe Charger
- Team name: Chargers
- Accreditation: North Central Association of Colleges and Schools
- Newspaper: The Lance
- Yearbook: The Blazon
- Tuition: US$10,400
- Affiliation: Christian Brothers
- Website: http://www.stjoeshs.org

St. Joseph High School (or St. Joe's) was a Roman Catholic, coeducational, college prep school in Westchester, Illinois, and was sponsored by the De La Salle Christian Brothers.

St. Joseph High School became accredited by the North Central Association of Colleges and Secondary Schools in 1987 and was approved by the Illinois State Board of Education. St. Joe's was a member of the National Catholic Educational Association and the Christian Brothers Educational Association. The school was also a member of the Illinois High School Association (IHSA) and the Chicago Catholic League (CCL).

== Admission ==
Students came from more than 40 elementary schools from the western suburbs and the City of Chicago. The students were accepted for admission based on the entrance exam, grade school records, and teachers’ recommendations for freshman year. Transfer students were accepted based on their academic records, discipline reports, and recommendations.

== History ==
St. Joseph High School exteriors (left to right) Construction and former St. Joseph Building (1840 S. Mayfair Avenue).

Samuel Stritch, Cardinal Archbishop of Chicago, invited the Christian Brothers to start a new high school in Westchester, Illinois. Construction of the original building (1840 S. Mayfair Ave.) began on July 2, 1959. Ground was broken, concrete was poured, and the first bricks of St. Joseph High School (the 1840 S. Mayfair Ave. address) were laid in 1959. Though classes began at the new school on September 7, 1960, work on the building continued through early 1961. The school was dedicated on September 16, 1961 by Cardinal Stritch's successor, Cardinal Albert Gregory Meyer. In July 1963, St. Joseph High School received state recognition as a three-year high school and was granted full approval as a member of the Illinois High School Association. By the spring of 1964, the educational program had developed to such an extent that the school was given full recognition by the State of Illinois as a four-year high school.

The school earned national attention in the 1994 documentary film Hoop Dreams. The subjects of the film, William Gates and Arthur Agee, were both students at the school, and both played on the basketball team under head coach Gene Pingatore.

In 2004, the school became the first Catholic high school in the state of Illinois to enter an all wireless, all laptop learning campus. Every student and teacher received an IBM/Lenovo laptop computer which they either purchased or leased from the school.

St. Joseph was an all-male institution until 2005, when Francis George, O.M.I., Cardinal Archbishop of Chicago, permitted the school to become coed in light of the closing of Immaculate Heart of Mary High School, the neighboring all-female institution. Prior to the opening of school in 2006, St. Joseph's purchased the former grounds and building of the Immaculate Heart of Mary High School, and started the second semester of the 2006–07 school year by moving classes into the building. The original St. Joseph High School building's classrooms are became vacant since 2007 with the gym used primarily for athletic facilities from 2007-2021 before it too was vacated. The entire plot of land including the former St. Joseph building, Christian Brothers residence (also vacant since 2006), and current school with former convent were placed under a TIF district for the Village of Westchester's redevelopment plans.

On April 13, 2021, the Board of Directors announced the closure of the school after the end of the 2020–21 school year. In July 2021, The SJHS memorabilia was archived and will be preserved in a number of locations including the Christian Brothers of the Midwest District Office as well as at the Village of Westchester Hall. St. Joseph High School worked with Winternitz Industrial Auctioneers & Appraisers to host a two day online only auction for the rest of the contents. As of April 13, 2022, approximately 1 year after the school announced its closure, all three buildings were still standing but vacant. The 29.25-acre lot of land was put up for sale to satisfy a large mortgage. The entire property was co-listed for sale through two commercial real estate brokerage firms, Anne Dempsey with Collier’s International and Andrew Polivka, The Polivka Group LLC. St. Joseph High School’s remaining administrators worked with the Village of Westchester and the Christian Brothers to sell the entire parcel.

The entire property was purchased by West 40 for $8 million dollars in 2023. The school building on Cermak Road now serves as new offices and an auxiliary school. The original high school building as well as the Christian Brothers Residence next door were demolished shortly after the purchase as they were deemed too dilapidated beyond repair, only the crumbling parking lot remains to this day.

== Great Seal ==
St. Joseph High School’s Great Seal.

In the center is the crest of the De La Salle Christian Brothers, also known as the Brothers of the Christian Schools, the Catholic congregation who sponsors St. Joseph High School. At the top of the crest is the Latin phrase Signum Fidei, which means "Sign of the Faith", and is the motto of the Brothers. Below the Brothers’ crest is the broken shield, the family emblem of St. John Baptist De La Salle, the 17th-century French saint who founded the Christian Brothers. Below it hangs the star of Bethlehem, a symbol used by Lasallian schools around the world.

On one side of the star of faith is the symbol of the Atomic Age which depicts the school's dedication to learning and technology. On the other side is the hammer and chisel representing the school's patron saint, Saint Joseph the Worker, who was noted for his simple, but hard work as a carpenter and as the legal father of Christ.

The entire crest is surrounded by plumes and a knight’s helmet, representing the English tradition of the Village of Westchester.

Finally, at the top of the great seal of St. Joseph High School is the school motto, “Vincit Qui Laborat,” which means “He conquers, who labors.” Directly below the school seal is a cross to indicate Roman Catholic Church.

== Academics ==
There were three academic programs in which students pursued coursework: Honors, College Prep (A), and College Prep (B).

Coursework was broken down into three divisions:

- Applied Sciences: Mathematics, Science, Computer/Technology, Physical Education
- Language Arts: English, Fine Arts, Spanish
- Social Sciences: Religious Studies, Business, Social Studies

The school offered the following AP courses: Calculus, English Literature and Composition, Studio Art, Spanish Language, and European History

In addition, students had the opportunity to take certain business courses online through Triton College.

Every spring, St. Joseph High School hosted ChargerFest and (since 1995) sponsored its US$10,000 Super Raffle, which were the school’s biggest fundraisers. ChargerFest featured a buffet, door prizes, additional raffles, games, and music.

In December 2005, St. Joseph High School hosted an event entitled “Becoming a True Leader,” which featured prominent leaders of today sharing leadership experiences and advice with the entire St. Joe's student body and visitors. Cardinal George began the program by blessing the St. Joseph community and the school’s past heritage and new initiatives.

== Athletics ==
St. Joseph was a member of the Chicago Catholic League.

- The school won the 1998—99 Illinois High School Association boys' basketball championship.
- St. Joe's Head Basketball Coach Gene Pingatore and alumnus Isiah Thomas were both members of the first class of the East Suburban Catholic Conference’s Hall of Fame in 2006. The school won the 2014–15 Illinois High School Association class 3A boys' basketball championship.
- The boys' basketball program is covered extensively in the 1994 documentary Hoop Dreams, which features two inner city Chicago players, William Gates and Arthur Agee, commuting to Westchester to attend the school due to its basketball program.
- 2016-17 St. Joseph Football Team had its best season in school history going 7–3, winning Conference for the first time ever on a varsity level and qualifying for the IHSA State Playoffs for the first time.

== Notable alumni ==
- Andy Frederick (class of 1973) was an offensive tackle in the National Football League (1977–85) and was a member of the Super Bowl XII champion Dallas Cowboys and the Super Bowl XX champion Chicago Bears.
- William Gates (class of 1991) basketball player; subject of the 1994 documentary Hoop Dreams
- Steven Harris is a professional actor.
- Wood Harris is a professional actor and younger brother of Steve Harris.
- Demetri McCamey (class of 2007) was a basketball guard for the Illinois Fighting Illini men's basketball team; he currently plays professionally in Japan
- Amal McCaskill was a professional basketball player, playing in the NBA (1996–97, 2001–04).
- Cameron Meredith (class of 2010) is an American football wide receiver for the New Orleans Saints of the NFL
- Saba, a rapper from Chicago who has done work with many rappers such as J. Cole, Chance the Rapper, and more.
- Isiah Thomas (class of 1979) NBA player, coach, executive, member of the 50 Greatest Players in NBA History team
- Evan Turner (class of 2007) is a former All-American, 2010 John Wooden Award winner and National Player of the Year at Ohio State (2007-2010); he currently plays guard/forward for the Minnesota Timberwolves
- Glynn Watson (class of 2015) is a college basketball player for the University of Nebraska-Lincoln and the younger brother of Demetri McCamey
- Pierre Walters, former NFL player for the Kansas City Chiefs and current mixed martial artist
