= Bernie Leahy =

American football player (1908–1978)

No. 6
- Position: Halfback

Personal information
- Born: August 15, 1908; Chicago, Illinois, U.S.
- Died: March 12, 1978 (aged 69); Walnut Creek, California, U.S.
- Listed height: 5 ft 11 in (1.80 m)
- Listed weight: 180 lb (82 kg)

Career information
- High school: St. Mel (Chicago, Illinois)
- College: Notre Dame (1928–1931)

Career history
- Chicago Bears (1932); Chicago Shamrocks (1932)

Awards and highlights
- 2× National champion (1929, 1930)
- Stats at Pro Football Reference

Bernard Phillip Leahy (August 15, 1908 – March 12, 1978) was an American professional football halfback who played one season with the Chicago Bears of the National Football League (NFL). He played college football at the University of Notre Dame.

== Early life and college ==
Bernard Phillip Leahy was born on August 15, 1908, in Chicago, Illinois. He attended St. Mel High School in Chicago. He did not play football until his third year of high school due to lack of weight. Leahy also played basketball in high school and helped St. Mel win the national Catholic basketball championship.

Leahy then enrolled at the University of Notre Dame. However, he did not initially join the football team and instead worked as a secretary at Notre Dame for two years to fund his education. He joined the Notre Dame Fighting Irish football team in 1928 and was a three-year letterman from 1929 to 1931. The Fighting Irish were named national champions by various selectors in both 1929 and 1930.

== Professional career ==
In July 1932, it was reported that Leahy had signed with the Chicago Bears. He played in one game for the Bears that year, recording one carry for one yard. He joined the independent Chicago Shamrocks later in the 1932 season.

== Personal life ==
Leahy died on March 12, 1978, in Walnut Creek, California.
