= Rabaza =

- Origin: Madagascar
- Genres: Kilalaka, tsapiky
- Members: R. Christo Benny

Rabaza is a musical group from Taolagnaro (Fort Dauphin) on the southern coast of Madagascar. They perform a blend of traditional musical styles, including kilalaka, tsapiky and mangaliba. The group was founded by R. Christo Benny, who had previously founded and co-led the group Hazolahy from 1998 to 2004. The band seeks to revitalize the musical traditions of the southern region of Anosy and primarily uses local instruments like the hazolahy drum, belamaky, pitiky langay, kasaky and langoro. Both albums enjoyed strong success across the island. The band has toured throughout Madagascar and the Indian Ocean islands and has participated in numerous regional music festivals. A song by Rabaza entitled Mifaneva was used in a film "Madagascar: Carnet de Voyage", which was nominated for an Oscar in the category "Best Animated Short Film" in 2011.

Rabaza "Mifaneva" (2008)
Mangaliba as performed by Rabaza, featuring the kabosy

== See also ==
- Music of Madagascar
