= 50 Films to See Before You Die =

2006 British television programme

50 Films to See Before You Die was a television programme first shown on Channel 4 on Saturday 22 July 2006, to celebrate the relaunch of Film4 as a free-to-air TV channel available to digital terrestrial homes in the United Kingdom.

== Criteria ==
It consisted of a list of 50 films compiled by film critics and personalities. Each film was "chosen as a paragon of a particular genre or style". Apocalypse Now was chosen as the #1 film.

Nine films on the list are from the 2000s, twelve from the 1990s, nine from the 1980s, nine from the 1970s, and only eleven movies from all the years prior to 1970.

Three of the 50 films on the list were produced or distributed by Channel 4's own Film4 Productions – Sexy Beast (#5), Trainspotting (#25) and Secrets & Lies (#49).

== See also ==
- 50 Documentaries to See Before You Die
