= 50 Documentaries to See Before You Die =

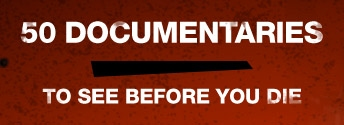
- Genre: Documentary
- Presented by: Morgan Spurlock
- Country of origin: United States
- Original language: English
- No. of seasons: 1
- No. of episodes: 5

Production
- Executive producers: Jim Fraenkel (series producer/director); Tom Barbor-Might
- Producers: Jason Berger; Jesse Dixon; Neil Edson; Toby Lichtig; Mark J. Marraccini
- Editors: Gabriel Edvy; Kieran Ridgers; Steven McInerney; Paul Mills; David Thompson
- Running time: 52 minutes
- Production companies: Kids at Play Media; Current TV

Original release
- Network: Current TV
- Release: 2 August – 30 August 2011

50 Documentaries to See Before You Die is a 2011 television special aired on Current TV. Presented by Morgan Spurlock, the series features a ranking of fifty documentary films.

== Summary ==
This limited series, presented by Morgan Spurlock and on the television network Current TV, featured what editors regard as fifty of the most influential and/or important documentary films from the 25 years prior to the series' debut. It aired in five hour-long episodes, each detailing ten entries on the list in a clip show format. In association with the series, Current TV aired some of the documentaries featured on the list.

The fifty titles were selected by a panel including film professor Michael Renov, International Documentary Association's then-president Eddie Schmidt, and television executive Brian Graden.

== Episodes ==
=== "Life After Donkey Kong" ===
- 43. When the Levees Broke: A Requiem in Four Acts, by Spike Lee (2006)
- 42. Catfish, by Henry Joost and Ariel Schulman (2010)
- 41. The King of Kong: A Fistful of Quarters, by Seth Gordon (2007)

=== "The Boy Who Loves Jesus Grows Up" ===
- 33. Tongues Untied, by Marlon Riggs (1989)
- 32. Dogtown and Z-Boys, by Stacy Peralta (2001)
- 31. Jesus Camp, by Rachel Grady and Heidi Ewing (2006)

=== "When Morgan Spurlock Met Mr. Brainwash" ===
- 23. The Eyes of Tammy Faye, by Fenton Bailey (2000)
- 22. Dixie Chicks: Shut Up and Sing, by Barbara Kopple and Cecilia Peck (2006)
- 21. Exit Through the Gift Shop, by Banksy (2010)

=== "When Morgan Spurlock Went to a Drag Ball" ===
- 13. The Fog of War, by Errol Morris (2003)
- 12. Bowling for Columbine, by Michael Moore (2002)
- 11. Paris Is Burning, by Jennie Livingston (1990)

=== "Top 10 Docs to See Before You Die" ===
- 3. Roger & Me, by Michael Moore (1989)
- 2. The Thin Blue Line, by Errol Morris (1988)
- 1. Hoop Dreams, by Steve James (1994)

== See also ==
- 50 Films to See Before You Die
- International Documentary Association top 25 documentaries
- Capturing Reality: The Art of Documentary
