= El espíritu de mi mamá =

- DVD cover
- Directed by: Ali Allie
- Written by: Ali Allie
- Produced by: Ali Allie
- Starring: Johana Martinez
- Release date: September 1, 1999 (MFF)
- Running time: 78 minutes
- Country: Honduras
- Language: Spanish

El espíritu de mi mamá ("The Spirit of my Mother") is a Spanish language feature film by Ali Allie about Garifuna woman's journey home to Honduras to embrace her cultural roots. It premiered at SXSW in 1999 and later at Dawn Breakers International Film Festival. It was released on DVD in 2002 by Vanguard Cinema and was the first fictional movie featuring Garifuna actors in leading roles. It features an extended religious ritual segment with traditional Garifuna songs and traditional punta dance.

== Synopsis ==
A meditative and dramatic tale of a young woman's remarkable journey to her forgotten homeland. Sonia is a single mother living in Los Angeles, far removed from her Garifuna—West African, Arawak and Carib Indian—roots. Haunted by memories of an American soldier she once loved and dreaming of her dead mother, Sonia searches for answers among the mundane landscape, but finds few. After getting fired from her job as a nanny, Sonia journeys to Honduras to grant her mother's request to perform a ceremony that will let her rest in peace. As her elders teach her the sacred Garifuna ritual, Sonia begins to embrace her own nearly forgotten and rich cultural roots, as well as her identity as a mother to a daughter of her own. Set amidst the Honduran landscape and punctuated by traditional Garifuna music, Spirit of my Mother is a story about one woman's transformation as she learns to embrace the past and move gracefully into the present. -- N. Isaacs, Mill Valley Film Festival

== Theatrical Screenings ==
- SXSW (Texas)
- FESPACO (Burkina Faso)
- Black International Cinema (Berlin)
- ZIFF (Tanzania)
- Urban World (New York)
- The World Film Festival (Montreal)
- Jornada de Cinema da Bahia (Brazil)
- CineLatino (San Francisco)
- Los Angeles Latino International Film Festival
- Cinema of the Americas (Miami)
- Film Arts (San Francisco)
- Savannah Film Festival (Georgia)
- African Diaspora International Film Festival (New York)
- Pan African Film Festival (Los Angeles)
- Pan-Cultural Film Festival (Houston)
- Ann Arbor Film Festival (Michigan)
- Chicago Latino International Film Festival (Illinois)
- Athens Film Festival (Ohio)
- Cine-Fiesta (Montreal)
- Smithsonian National Museum (Washington DC)

== World Premiere Program Notes ==
"An altogether original take on the mother/daughter story, The Spirit of My Mother (El espíritu de mi mamá) is a unique film essay. Blending narrative and documentary techniques, director Allié tells the story of one woman’s quest to reach out to her mother, and to the ancestral traditions and endangered culture of the Garifuna." -- Heather Courtney, SXSW Film Festival

== Reviews ==
"An ethnographic dramatic debut which makes up in sincerity what it obviously lacked in available coin... paints vivid portrait of the culture" -- Variety
