= Dawn Breakers International Film Festival =

- Location: Traveling/International
- No. of films: 100+
- Language: Multilingual
- Website: http://www.dbiff.com

Dawn Breakers International Film Festival (DBIFF) was an international travelling film festival held in various cities throughout the world from 2007 to 2015. The festival debuted in Phoenix, Arizona and was later held in San Diego, Houston and Zürich. DBIFF was recognized as an important festival and nominated at the 2014 annual list of MovieMaker's "Top 25 Film Festivals of the World" in the Social Cause category. Selected films from this festival has received theatrical distribution, television broadcast and four Academy Award nominations.

== Background ==
The Festival is a non-profit organization focused on showcasing films and filmmakers who produce positive films. It has shown both independent and commercial films in the past few years. The filmmakers submit from around the world and there are no restrictions on what is accepted as long as it meets the theme of the festival. DBIFF is one of the few festivals in the world that also accepts Television, Music Videos and Websidoes in their selection. Several publications have covered the festival and the films including the Indian Express, the BNS, and the Samoan news.

Since it is a traveling festival and may take place more than once within a year, it is also named by "Takes" alongside the year.

== 2007 / Take 1 ==
The festival took place in San Diego with a circle of invited guests and audiences only. A number of films were screened through the two-day festival, however no public announcement of the official selections were made as there were no selection process that year and all films were invites only.

== 2008 / Take 2 ==
In 2008, it attracted some 500 attendees each day and a total of 1000 for both days from around the world. Films shown in the festival were selected from around the globe, some countries included India, Australia, United States, Spain, United Kingdom, Cambodia, France, Malaysia, Hungary, Pakistan, Canada and Ethiopia.

=== Films ===
- Armed - Music video, Justin Baldoni's directorial debut
- A Boy from Jenjarom - Short documentary
- Ardia - Short film
- Corde - Short documentary
- Choke - Short film
- Donkey In Lahore - Full-length documentary, Tribeca winner
- Justice - Short film
- Little Mosque on the Prairie - Television show
- Son Maloso - Music Video
- The Gallery - Short film
- The Prayer - Short film
- The Wayfarer - Full-length documentary
- Tsehai Loves Learning - Animated television show (Ethiopia)
- Uncle Hathi - Animated television show (India)

== 2009 / Take 3 ==
The 2009, also known as Take 3 Dawn Breakers International Film Festival took place in Zürich from December 26, 2009, to December 31, 2009. This year's line-up included twice as many films as last year and took place over five days.

=== Films ===
- 18:44, Short film, New Zealand, World Premier
- Afghan, Short film
- Amor in Motion, Short film, World Premier
- Antes Que O Mundo Acabe (Before the World Ends), Feature film, World Premier
- Arising to Serve, Full-length doc, World Premier
- Baber Makes An Entrance – Little Mosque on the Prairie, TV, World Premier
- Chase, Short film, World Premier
- IL Diavlo (The Devil), Short film
- El Espiritu de mi Mama, Feature film (Mexico), World Premier
- Essences & Particularities, Experimental, World Premier
- Fast Slow Dissolving Tablets, Short film, World Premier
- Fragile, Short film
- The Fashioner, Documentary, World Premier
- From Reservation to Revelation, Documentary, World Premier
- Got You, Music video, World Premier
- Hossein Amanat - Baha'i Architect, Documentary, World Premier
- The Voyages of Jenny Alexandria, Animation
- Lie Zi (Master Lie), Animation, World Premier
- Light Upon Light, Short film, World Premier
- The Lost City, Short film
- Method Acting, Short film
- Murder With Impunity, Webcast, World Premier
- My New Home, Short film
- The Power of Forgiveness, Documentary, World Premier
- The Promise of World Peace, Documentary, World Premier
- The Providence Effect, Documentary International Premier
- Red Fish, Short film
- Social Studies, Short film, World Premier
- Speak and Lie, Animation, World Premier
- School, Short film, World Premier
- The Study Circle, Webcast, World Premier
- Tanha-e (Solitude), Animation
- Tokaheya Inajin - The First to Arise, Documentary, World Premier
- Two Men, Two Cows, Two Guns, Short film
- United for Baha'i Human Rights, Webcast, World Premier
- What Goes Around Comes Around, Music Video,

== 2010 / Take 4 ==
The 2010 film festival took place in the United States in the city of San Diego. It was scheduled for November 26 through 27 at the Sheraton Hotel across San Diego International Airport. On November 13, 2010, a press release announced the festival's official selection which included 44 films in all categories.

William Sears (Baháʼí) a popular TV host from the 1950s was honored during the festival. Two of this year's selection are shortlisted for the 83rd Academy Awards. and one was nominated. Most of this year's selection were either world or international premiers.

=== Films ===
Below is a particle list of the selected films with notes about each film.

- A Cut Above
- Adam – The Man
- All Birds Whistle
- Aqueous Duende - experimental film
- Annie, Forget Your Gun
- Y aquellas (And These)
- Bobo & Kipi - TV show from Congo
- Das Verlorene Paradies (Paradise Lost)
- Dr. Elham Show Websisodes from South Africa
- Enoch Olinga
- Feeling from Afghanistan
- Faith in Common starting Anthony Azizi Music by KC Porter
- Escuchar (Listen) - Spain
- The Butterfly Circus funded by Doorstep
- Hemels Bewegen (The Conquest of High Passes)
- Plastic & Glass - French experimental
- Out of Sight
- No Longer There - Music video of Carl Young by Jack Lenz
- Nebeneinander (Side By Side)
- Madregot (Stairs)
- Madagascar, carnet de voyage, nominated for the Oscars
- Linger - Singapore's new wave
- Letters to Ourselves
- Jewel in the Lotus - about the House of Worship in India
- Glenn, The Flying Robot feature film from Ireland
- The Secret Friend
- The Road Home Student Oscar winner
- The Last Conversation - about the Persecution of Baháʼís
- The Invigilator
- Hands of the Cause - four volume film about the Hands of the Cause
- Straight Ahead
- Shoghi Effendi (documentary) about Shoghi Effendi
- Roca Bon - exploring the art of Mark Tobey
- River to Reef - environmental film
- Kol Shtut (Any Little Thing)
- Laredo, Texas
- To Comfort You
- Where There is Love - video of Elika Mahony
- Vostok Station
- Us (film)
- Urs (film)
- Zero on the Oscar shortlist

== 2011 / Take 5 ==
A two-day festival was held in Houston. This festival marked DBIFF's premier in the south and the first major event to be held in the Houston Community Center.

A Media Boot Camp in association with the BMS was held during the ABS conference in San Francisco in August 2011.

== 2012 / Take 6 ==
Take 6 / 2012 festival takes place in Switzerland.

=== Take 6 Films ===
- 20zwoelf (20zwoelf) / Christian Stahl / Animation / Germany / Switzerland Premiere
- Amen! / Moritz Mayerhofer / Animation / Germany / Switzerland Premiere
- Andersartig (Different) / Dennis Stein-Schomburg / Animation / Germany / Switzerland Premiere
- Baed Az Class (After The Class) / Fereshteh Parnian / Short Narrative / Iran / World Premiere
- Batang Aquarium (Aquarium Kids) / Eleazar L. Del Rosario / Documentary / Philippines / International Premiere
- Bestiaire / Denis Côté / Documentary / Canada / France / Switzerland Premiere
- Booze Culture / Graeme Noble / Short Narrative / United Kingdom / World Premiere
- Chant Supplications Together: Tap Into the Power of Devotional Singing / Nancy A. Watters / Documentary / Canada / World Premiere
- D'Symmetrie vum Päiperlek (The Symmetry of the Butterfly) / Paul Scheuer and Maisy Hausemer / Feature Narrative / Luxembourg / International Premiere
- Don't Hug Me I'm Scared / Joseph Pelling, Becky Sloan / Short Narrative / UK / Switzerland Premiere
- Ei voor later / Marieke Schellart / Documentary / Netherlands / Switzerland Premiere
- Faced out / Omar Nayef / Documentary / Egypt / World Premiere
- Fast in a Day / Afshin Rohani, Sahba Saberian, Victoria Eyton / Documentary / UK / World Premiere
- Father's Chair (A Cadeira Do Pai) / Luciano Moura / Feature Narrative / Brazil / Switzerland Premiere
- Felix (Felix) / Anselm Belser / Short Narrative / Germany / Switzerland Premiere
- Finding Ambrosia / Colin Scully / Short Narrative / United States / World Premiere
- Fishing Without Nets / Cutter Hodierne / Short Narrative / Kenya / Switzerland Premiere
- Freedom / Khaled Hafi / Short Narrative / Algeria, France, Tunisia / International Premiere
- Geschwister (Siblings) / Joya Thome / Short Narrative / Germany / Switzerland Premiere
- Good Error / Mo'men Abd Elsalam / Animation / Egypt / World Premiere
- Guilford Street (Οδός Γκύλφορδ) / Christos Ouzounis / Short Narrative / Greece / World Premiere
- Haraka (Motion) / Sarah Rozik / Documentary / Egypt / World Premiere
- Here in the Last Moment / Nicola Trombley / Experimental / USA / World Premiere
- Home / Yann Arthus-Bertrand / Documentary / France / World Premiere
- Iranian Taboo / Reza Allamehzadeh / Documentary / Netherlands, U.S.A. / Switzerland Premiere
- Jesus and Buddha: Practicing Across Traditions / John Ankele, Anne Macksoud / Documentary / United States / World Premiere
- l'île (the island) / Pauline Delwaulle / Documentary / France / International Premiere
- Landscape of the Elderly / Rami el Harayri & Maarten Stoltz / Short Narrative / Netherlands / Switzerland Premiere
- Logging Sports / Andreas Attai / Documentary / USA / World Premiere
- Lotus Sutra / Deepak Verma, Neha Chopra / Documentary / India / World Premiere
- Luminous Journey: Abdu'l-Baha in America, 1912 / Tim Perry / Documentary / United States / World Premiere
- May 1926 / Tasnim Mustafa / Short Narrative / Egypt / World Premiere
- Memoria / Yihwen Chen / Short Narrative / Malaysia / European Premiere
- Memories / Ferhat Alpözen / Short Narrative / Turkey / World Premiere
- Morning Prayer / Nabil Moghaddam / Music Video / Canada / World Premiere
- My Last Days / Justin Baldoni / Documentary / USA / World Premiere
- Neue Nähe / Sonja Vukovic, Christian Stahl / Short Narrative / Germany / Switzerland Premiere
- New Light / Sahba Sanai / Short Narrative / Australia / World Premiere
- Old Angel (老天使) / Yen-Ting Chiang / Animation / Taiwan (ROC) / World Premiere
- Otis Under Sky / Anlo Sepulveda / Feature Narrative / USA / International Premiere
- Occupy Skepticism / Juan Sebastian Barreneche / Documentary / United States / World Premiere
- Peter Bossman dobrodošel (Welcome Peter Bossman) / Simon Intihar / Documentary / Slovenia / Switzerland Premiere
- Raising the Titanic / Alex Mitchell / Documentary / United States / World Premiere
- Reiko's Hina Dolls / Komaki Matsui / Short Narrative / Canada, USA / World Premiere
- Sailor / Brittany Gustafson / Short Narrative / United States of America / World Premiere
- Silence and Desire (Sessizlik ve Özlem) / Imren Tuzun / Short Narrative / Turkey / European Premiere
- Scorpions (Skorpionit) / Simo Hakalisto / Documentary / Finland / World Premiere
- Sol de Verano (Summer's sun) / David Dely / Music Video / Hungary, Colombia / World Premiere
- Super Soul Sunday / Devon Gundry / Television / USA / International Premiere
- Rustman (Zhangis katsi) / Giorgi Tavartkiladze / Short Narrative / Georgia / World Premiere
- The Dance / Pardis Parker / Short Narrative / Canada / Switzerland Premiere
- The Gospel of Us / Dave McKean / Feature Narrative / United Kingdom / World Premiere
- The Most Beautiful Flower Blooms in Winter / Vic Barnes / Short Narrative / United States / World Premiere
- The Photograph / Sonbol Taefi, Sohail Sabetian / Music Video / New Zealand, Ireland, China / World Premiere
- The Settler / Maram Ashour / Short Narrative / United Arab Emirates / International Premiere
- The Sweatshop / Chin Tangsakulsathaporn / Short Narrative / United States / European Premiere
- Thomas Hempel / Regieassistent (Thomas Hempel - First Assistant Director) / Short Narrative / Germany / World Premiere
- Thunder May Have Ruined The Moment / Pete Monro / Experimental / USA / World Premiere
- Transit in a green landscape / Sonja van Kerkhoff, Sen McGlinn / Music Video / New Zealand / Switzerland Premiere
- Truks / Joao Inacio / Documentary / Brazil / International Premiere
- Txiki / Sergio San Martin / Documentary / Spain / Switzerland Premiere
- Uncle Hathi and His Friends - The pink Rabbit / Hamed Mohajer / Animation / India / World Premiere
- Under the Staircase / Kimia Ferdowsi Kline / Documentary / United States / International Premier
- West Gilgo Mural Project / John Bragino / Documentary / United States / International Premiere

=== Hueman Photography Contest ===
The festival announced a photography contest that would showcase the works of its finalists during the film festival.

== 2013 / Take 7 ==
The festival was held in Scottsdale, Arizona over two days and was the first time to be coordinated locally. It was the second time DBIFF proceeds went to charity, the first being Houston.

== 2014 / Take 8 ==
Submission period for the 2014 film festival took place over three months and ended in December 2013.

== 2015 / Take 9 ==
The 2015 festival was held online with content being broadcast from New York. The festival moved submission system to FilmFreeway.
