= Hoop Dreams =

1994 American documentary film

- Theatrical release poster
- Directed by: Steve James
- Written by: Frederick Marx; Steve James
- Produced by: Frederick Marx; Steve James; Peter Gilbert
- Starring: William Gates; Arthur Agee
- Cinematography: Peter Gilbert
- Edited by: Frederick Marx; Steve James; William Haugse
- Music by: Ben Sidran
- Production company: Kartemquin Films
- Distributed by: Fine Line Features (United States); Capitol Films (Overseas)
- Release date: October 14, 1994 (United States)
- Running time: 171 minutes
- Country: United States
- Language: English
- Budget: $700,000
- Box office: $11.8 million

Hoop Dreams is a 1994 American documentary film directed by Steve James, and produced by Frederick Marx, James, and Peter Gilbert, with Kartemquin Films. It follows the story of two African-American high school students, William Gates and Arthur Agee, in Chicago and their dream of becoming professional basketball players.

Hoop Dreams was originally intended to be a 30-minute short film produced for PBS; the filming of the special led to five years of filming and 250 hours of footage. Hoop Dreams premiered at the 1994 Sundance Film Festival, where it won the Audience Award for Best Documentary. It won numerous other awards in the 1994 season, although it was not nominated for the Academy Award for Best Documentary Feature, which led to a massive public outcry. Despite its length (171 minutes) and unlikely commercial genre, it received high critical and popular acclaim, and grossed over $11 million worldwide.

Hoop Dreams was ranked #1 on the Current TV special 50 Documentaries to See Before You Die. In 2005, the film was selected for preservation in the United States National Film Registry by the Library of Congress as being "culturally, historically, or aesthetically significant". The International Documentary Association's members ranked Hoop Dreams as the best documentary of all time in 2007.

== Plot ==
In 1987, William Gates and Arthur Agee, two African-American teenagers, are recruited by a scout from St. Joseph High School in Westchester, Illinois, a predominantly White high school with an outstanding basketball program. The team is led by Gene Pingatore, who coached National Basketball Association (NBA) Hall of Fame player Isiah Thomas when Thomas played at St. Joseph. Agee and Gates are both from poor African-American neighborhoods in Chicago, Illinois: Gates lives in the Cabrini–Green projects, while Agee and his family reside in West Garfield Park. Both boys face 90-minute commutes to the school each way.

In their freshman year, Gates starts on the varsity team at St. Joseph and helps them win the sectional title, earning a mention from The Sportswriters on TV as possibly "the next Isiah Thomas", although St. Joseph is eliminated in the super-sectionals in a narrow loss to St. Francis de Sales High School. Meanwhile, Agee plays on the freshman team and struggles both on the court and in the classroom.

At the end of the year, Agee is kicked out of St. Joseph as his family is unable to pay his tuition; Gates's fees are covered by his sponsor, the president of Encyclopedia Britannica, who also helps him find a white collar summer job. Agee's rejection from St. Joseph damages his self-confidence, and he plays poorly for the high school team at John Marshall High School, coached by Luther Bedford. In his sophomore year, Gates again starts on the varsity team. St. Joseph is eliminated by Gordon Tech in the sectional finals, and Gates struggles with the weight of expectations from his brother, Curtis, who was a talented player in his own right but never made it to the pros and has now transferred his unfulfilled aspirations onto his younger brother.

In their junior year, both boys face challenges. Gates suffers a knee injury that requires surgery and months of rehabilitation, while Arthur's mother, Sheila, loses her job and the family goes on welfare as Arthur's father, Bo, has walked out and become addicted to drugs. Bo later gives up drugs and returns to the family, and Sheila earns a nursing degree. During this time, the Agee household takes in Arthur's close friend, Shannon, who is escaping an abusive household.

On the court, Agee and John Marshall improve on their poor sophomore year record, including winning an upset victory over Dunbar Vocational High School. St. Joseph makes it to the sectional finals, where they once again face Gordon Tech. Gates plays timidly because of his injury. At the end of the fourth quarter, with seconds on the clock and trailing by one, St. Joseph wins two free throws. Gates—normally a clutch free throw shooter—steps up to take them, but he misses both and St. Joseph is knocked out of the play-offs.

Despite his injury, Gates is courted by many college basketball programs, especially Marquette University, and attends the Nike All-America summer camp at Princeton before his senior year (where Dick Vitale and Spike Lee make appearances). After returning from camp, Gates signs a letter of intent with Marquette, though he struggles to meet the minimum ACT test score to be eligible for an athletic scholarship. Meanwhile, Arthur, playing high school basketball in the Chicago Public High School League, attracts far less attention from college recruiters, although a couple of junior colleges show interest in him.

In Gates's senior year, St. Joseph's season concludes early in a second-round play-off loss against Nazareth Academy, ending his hopes of "going downstate" for the state championship. Gates had been benched by Coach Pingatore at the start of the game for arriving late. John Marshall goes on an unlikely run through the city championship, largely thanks to Agee's excellent play. The team makes it to the state championship in Champaign, finishing third in the state after a semi-final loss to Manual High School.

At the end of the film, Gates has entered Marquette University in Milwaukee, Wisconsin, and Agee is attending Mineral Area College in Park Hills, Missouri, and still hoping to play for the NBA.

== Production ==
=== Development ===
The initial idea for "a film about the culture of basketball in the black community" came to director Steve James, an amateur basketball player himself, in 1985 while watching basketball at the recreation center at Southern Illinois University. James reached out to his friend Frederick Marx, then in China teaching English, who liked the idea. The two agreed that both of them would produce the film, James would direct, and Marx would edit. James thought of the title Hoop Dreams very early in the development process; they also briefly considered calling it Hoopin'.

In 1987, James received a $2,000 fellowship grant from the Illinois Arts Council to work on the film. James and Marx then pitched their idea to Gordon Quinn of Kartemquin Films. Initially, they planned to focus on a single playground for a 30-minute documentary they hoped would be aired on PBS. Quinn liked the idea and agreed to take the project on. Unable to raise any money besides James's grant, the pair decided to shoot on video instead of film (an unusual choice for the time), and they hired Peter Gilbert to do cinematography as he had his own gear.

=== Filming ===
The filmmakers contacted coach Gene Pingatore of St. Joseph High School as he had coached Chicago native Isiah Thomas in high school. Pingatore introduced them to "Big Earl" Smith, a talent scout who was familiar with the inner-city playgrounds that the filmmakers wanted to shoot on. Smith brought them to several playgrounds, and at one of them he spotted a young Arthur Agee as a promising player. Agee agreed to be part of the film, and Smith helped arrange for him to attend Coach Pingatore's summer camp, where Thomas would be making an appearance.

When the filmmakers interviewed Pingatore about Agee, he said it was too early to tell about him, but mentioned that another kid, William Gates, could be "the next Isiah Thomas". James, Marx, and Gilbert decided to include Gates in their film as well, and began to consider expanding the scope of their original vision.

For two years, the three filmmakers continued to shoot intermittently and send demos out without raising any additional money. KTCA, a public television channel in Minnesota, heard about the film, and pledged $60,000, plus another $70,000 from the Corporation for Public Broadcasting, to fund an hour-long film. While continuing to search for more funds, the filmmakers considered other ideas, including a segment on a female high school player and a comedy sketch starring Tim Meadows.

With limited financial backing, James, Marx, and Gilbert could only manage 22 days of filming for the entire first two years, and each of the filmmakers worked on other projects at times during the filming of Hoop Dreams. By continuing to include Agee even after he was dropped from St. Joseph, they won the trust of him and his family, and the filmmakers began to delve deeper into the personal lives of the boys. At one point, the electricity was turned off in the Agee home; the filmmakers continued filming and (off-camera) provided money for the lights to be turned back on.

The filmmakers shot another 40 days during the boys' junior year. James was able to leverage a relationship with the vice president of the MacArthur Foundation into a $250,000 grant for the film, which allowed them to shoot 100 days from the end of junior year to the end of the film. By the end of filming, they had captured 250 hours of footage.

=== Post-production ===
Hoop Dreams spent three years in editing, during which it was cut down from a first assemblage of more than 10 hours, to a six-hour version, to a rough cut that they showed the boys, their families, and Coach Pingatore. Per their original agreement, Marx handled the editing, but after two years he asked James and William Haugse to step in to help him. James and Haugse spent another year and a half editing. By the spring of 1993, they had a cut ready and began to consider releasing it in theaters.

== Release ==
Hoop Dreams premiered at the 1994 Sundance Film Festival, where it won the Audience Award for Best Documentary. It ran on the closing night of the 1994 New York Film Festival, the first time a documentary film had ever closed the festival. The filmmakers had previously had to turn down an appearance at the 1993 edition of the festival as the film was not yet ready. Its appearance at Sundance helped it secure a distribution deal with Fine Line Features, and the film opened nationwide on October 21, 1994. It grossed $7.8 million domestically and $4 million internationally, for a worldwide total of $11.8 million.

== Reception ==
The film was widely acclaimed by critics. Gene Siskel and Roger Ebert gave the film "Two Very Enthusiastic Thumbs Up" on their show, with both critics naming Hoop Dreams the best film of 1994. Ebert in his initial television review proclaimed "This is one of the best films about American life that I have ever seen", and later called it the best film of the decade and "one of the great moviegoing experiences of my lifetime." In 2004, The New York Times placed the film on its Best 1000 Movies Ever list. The film has a 98% approval rating from Rotten Tomatoes, based on 62 reviews with an average rating of 8.8/10. The website's critical consensus states, "One of the most critically acclaimed documentaries of all time, Hoop Dreams is a rich, complex, heartbreaking, and ultimately deeply rewarding film that uses high school hoops as a jumping-off point to explore issues of race, class, and education in modern America." Metacritic assigned the film a weighted average score of 98 out of 100, based on 19 critics, indicating "universal acclaim".

In 2024, Looper ranked it number 2 on its list of the "50 Best PG-13 Movies of All Time," writing "Don't be intimidated by the 170-minute runtime of Hoop Dreams. Though a lengthy commitment, this project from director Steve James is undeniably rewarding as a cinematic experience."

The film was ranked number one on the International Documentary Association's Top 25 Documentaries list, based on polling of members in 2007. It was also ranked number one on the Current TV special 50 Documentaries to See Before You Die. In 2005, Hoop Dreams was included in the annual selection of 25 motion pictures added to the National Film Registry of the Library of Congress, being deemed "culturally, historically, or aesthetically significant" and recommended for preservation.

=== Year-end lists ===
- 1st – Gene Siskel, The Chicago Tribune
- 1st – Roger Ebert, Chicago Sun Times
- 1st – Kenneth Turan, Los Angeles Times
- 1st – Stephen Hunter, The Baltimore Sun
- 1st – Mack Bates, The Milwaukee Journal
- 2nd – Janet Maslin, The New York Times
- 2nd – Steve Persall, St. Petersburg Times
- 3rd – Peter Travers, Rolling Stone
- 3rd – Douglas Armstrong, The Milwaukee Journal
- 3rd – Robert Denerstein, Rocky Mountain News
- 3rd – Todd Anthony, Miami New Times
- 3rd – Sean P. Means, The Salt Lake Tribune
- 4th – Desson Howe, The Washington Post
- 4th – Yardena Arar, Los Angeles Daily News
- 6th – Michael Mills, The Palm Beach Post
- 9th – Peter Rainer, Los Angeles Times
- 10th – Glenn Lovell, San Jose Mercury News
- Top 7 (not ranked) – Duane Dudek, Milwaukee Sentinel
- Top 10 (listed alphabetically, not ranked) – Eleanor Ringel, The Atlanta Journal-Constitution
- Top 10 (listed alphabetically, not ranked) – Steve Murray, The Atlanta Journal-Constitution
- Top 10 (listed alphabetically, not ranked) – Mike Clark, USA Today
- Top 10 (listed alphabetically, not ranked) – William Arnold, Seattle Post-Intelligencer
- Top 10 (listed alphabetically, not ranked) – Jeff Simon, The Buffalo News
- Top 10 (not ranked) – Betsy Pickle, Knoxville News-Sentinel
- Top 10 (not ranked) – Howie Movshovitz, The Denver Post
- Best of the year (not ranked) - Jeffrey Lyons and Michael Medved, Sneak Previews
- Honorable mention – David Elliott, The San Diego Union-Tribune

=== Awards ===
- 1994 Sundance Film Festival: Audience Award for Best Documentary
- 1994 National Society of Film Critics: Best Nonfiction Film
- 1994 Los Angeles Film Critics Association: Best Non-fiction Film
- 1994 New York Film Critics Circle: Best Documentary
- 1994 Chicago Film Critics Award: Best Picture
- 1994 Directors Guild of America Awards: Outstanding Directorial Achievement in Documentary
- 1994 Academy Award nomination: Best Editing
- 1995 Peabody Award

== Academy Awards controversy ==
Ira Deutchman, who helped distribute the film with Fine Line, advocated for the film to be nominated for Best Picture at the Academy Awards. When the film, along with the equally acclaimed Crumb a year later, was not nominated in either the Best Picture or the Best Documentary categories, public outcry led to a revised nomination process in the category, led by Oscar-winning documentarian Barbara Kopple. According to Roger Ebert, reliable sources said members of the Academy's documentary nomination committee had a system in which one would wave a flashlight on screen when they gave up on the film. When a majority of the lights flashed, the film was turned off. Hoop Dreams was screened, but, per Ebert, was shut off after 15 minutes. Moreover, the nomination system at the time was based on total points earned when voters gave ratings from 4 to 10 for each documentary. A group of voters gave the lowest possible rating to Hoop Dreams and other films. The flashlight system was ended, and the rating scale was reduced. Siskel, while also objecting to Hoop Dreams being passed by for the nomination, said that it led to more widespread media coverage of the film.

In response to the controversy, Bruce Davis, the Academy's executive director, asked accounting firm Price Waterhouse to turn over the voting results, in which each voter had given a rating from zero to ten to each of the eligible documentaries. According to Davis, "a small group of members gave zeros to every single film except the five they wanted to see nominated. And they gave tens to those five, which completely skewed the voting ... There was one film that received more scores of ten than any other, but it was not nominated. It also got zeros from those few voters, and that was enough to push it to sixth place."

== Legacy ==
Neither Agee nor Gates were drafted into the NBA. Nonetheless, both young men were able to turn the film's success and their subsequent fame into a better life for themselves and their families. Gates played three seasons of college basketball at Marquette University before quitting the program, but he graduated from the university in 1999 with a communications degree. Agee went on to play at Arkansas State and later in the United States Basketball League and the International Basketball Association. The producers gave both Gates and Agee almost $200,000 in royalties from the film, although they were barred from accepting the money until after college due to National Collegiate Athletic Association rules. In 2001, Gates practiced with Michael Jordan ahead of a tryout with the Washington Wizards, but he fractured his foot and decided to retire from basketball permanently.

Agee, the younger of the two basketball players, launched a foundation promoting higher education for inner-city youth and began the "Hoop Dreams" sportswear line in 2006. Gates became the senior pastor at Living Faith Community Center in Cabrini–Green, where he worked at the Kids' Club. The families of both men have experienced losses since the release of the film. Agee's half-brother DeAntonio was killed on Thanksgiving morning 1994; Gates's older brother, Curtis, was shot to death in Chicago Lawn in September 2001; and Agee's father, Bo, was murdered in 2004.

=== Unofficial sequel ===
An unofficial sequel not made by the original filmmakers, Hoop Reality (2007), explores what happened during the decade after Hoop Dreams. Patrick Beverley from Chicago's West Side appears as a struggling potential star also at John Marshall Metropolitan High School and is mentored by Agee and basketball coach Lamont Bryant. Beverley entered the 2009 NBA draft, and was selected with the 42nd overall pick by the Los Angeles Lakers.

== 20th anniversary restoration ==
A digital restoration of the film, created by a partnership of the Sundance Institute, UCLA Film and Television Archive, the Academy Film Archive and Kartemquin Films, premiered at the 2014 Sundance Film Festival for the film's 20th anniversary. The restoration used the original analog video masters to create a high-definition digital master that was higher-quality than the cropped and transferred version that was released commercially. The Criterion Collection released the restored Hoop Dreams Blu-ray on March 31, 2015.

== See also ==
- List of basketball films
- List of films shot over three or more years
- Abacus: Small Enough to Jail, the 2016 documentary film that earned Steve James his first Academy Award for Best Documentary Feature nomination
- Last Chance U, a similar documentary series about college basketball and football
