= Zero (2010 film) =

- Film poster
- Directed by: Christopher Kezelos
- Written by: Christopher Kezelos
- Produced by: Christine Kezelos
- Narrated by: Nicholas McKay
- Music by: Kyls Burtland
- Production company: Zealous Creative
- Release date: 2010
- Running time: 12:32
- Country: Australia
- Language: English
- Budget: AUD 40,000 (estimated)

Zero is a 2010 Australian stop motion animated short film written and directed by Christopher Kezelos and produced by Christine Kezelos.

== Awards, nominations and screenings ==
=== Awards ===
- 2010 LA Shorts Fest: Best Animation
- 2010 Rhode Island International Film Festival: (tied with) First Place – Best Animation
- 2010 Grand OFF – World Independent Film Awards: Best Animation
- 2010 ATOM Awards: Best Animation
- 2010 Naples International Film Festival: Best Short Film
- 2010 Flickerfest International Film Festival: Best Achievement in Sound
- 2010 Australian Cinematographers Society: Golden Tripod – Experimental & Specialised (National)
- 2009 Australian Cinematographers Society: Gold Award – Experimental & Specialised (NSW/ACT)
- 2010 Bondi Short Film Festival: Best Script
- 2010 Bondi Short Film Festival: Best Design
- 2011 Shorts Film Festival: Bronze Award
- 2011 Lady Filmmakers Film Festival: Ladies Kick Butt
- 2011 Sandfly Film Festival: Best Animation
- 2011 Sandfly Film Festival: Best Australian Short
- 2011 Sandfly Film Festival: Best at Sandfly

=== Nominations ===
- 2010 AFI Awards: Nominated for Best Short Animation
- 2010 Inside Film Awards: Nominated for Best Short Animation
- 2010 APRA Screen Music Awards: Nominated for Best Music in a Short Film
- 2010 Australian Screen Sound Awards: Nominated for Best Sound in an Animated Short Film or Program

=== Screenings ===
- 2010 Palm Springs International ShortFest & Film Market: Official Selection
- 2010 Savannah Film Festival: Official Selection
- 2010 Hiroshima International Animation Festival: Official Selection
- 2010 Seoul International Cartoon Animation Festival: Official Selection (SICAF Choice)
- 2010 Anima Mundi International Animation Festival of Brazil: Official Selection (Panorama) – 2010 Bradford Animation Festival: Official Selection
- 2010 St Kilda Film Festival: Official Selection
- 2010 Lucania Film Festival: Official Selection
- 2010 Australian Effects and Animation Festival: Official Selection
- 2010 Anim’est International Animation Film Festival: Official Selection
- 2010 Bumbershoot – Seattle Music & Arts Festival: Official Selection
- 2010 North Country Film Festival: Official Selection
- 2010 ANIMANIMA – International Festival of Animation: Official Selection (Panorama)
- 2010 Anaheim International Film Festival: Official Selection
- 2010 Foyle Film Festival: Official Selection
- 2010 Montreal Stop Motion Film Festival: Official Selection
- 2010 Science Fiction + Fantasy Short Film Festival: Official Selection
- 2010 Animated Dreams Film Festival: Official Selection
- 2010 Etudia&Anima Festival: Official Selection
- 2010 Dawn Breakers International Film Festival: Official Selection
- 2010 Open Media Festival: Official Selection
- 2010 Adelaide Film Festival: Official Selection
