= The Providence Effect =

- Promotional film poster
- Directed by: Rollin Binzer
- Produced by: Rollin Binzer; Tom Hurvis
- Cinematography: Robert Tutman
- Edited by: Richard La Porta
- Music by: Tom Dumont; Ted Matson
- Production company: Dinosaurs of the Future
- Distributed by: Slowhand Cinema Releasing
- Release date: February 23, 2009
- Running time: 92 minutes
- Country: United States
- Language: English

The Providence Effect is a 2009 documentary film directed by Rollin Binzer about the transformation of the Chicago K-12 public school Providence St. Mel from a typical "inner city" school to a top tier institution. It had its world premier at the Dawn Breakers International Film Festival in Zurich.

== Background ==
This documentary was made to promote discussion and interest in school reform. Tom Hurvis has been a long-time sponsor of scholarships and internships for inner city youth. The current strengths of Providence St. Mel, its curriculum, its success, and its discipline, are seen as anomalies when compared to typical inner city schools. In a neighborhood plagued by gangs drugs, and high-crime the school emerged as premiere preparatory school - one that sent 100 percent of its students to college for 30 consecutive years. with half of the graduates passing first-tier, and even Ivy League schools. When Hurvis discovered Providence St. Mel, he was inspired to create the documentary.

== Synopsis ==
The Providence Effect is a film about Paul Adams III and the inner city Chicago school he founded and brought to prominence. Formerly a private Catholic school scheduled to be closed, Providence St. Mel has become a private school with rigorous educational standards and expectations. The film documents how the school sets and encourages those goals for students. The school's achievements, including how they were achieved, were outlined and supported by a series of testimonials from educators, community figures, and national leaders.

The documentary also depicted how its school president, Paul Adams III, was able to introduce a model that gave both poor and wealthy students the same opportunities. The idea was that inner-city black and Hispanic children can compete with anyone on an intellectual level given access to equal academic opportunities. With this view, Adams transformed the school from an institution facing closure by the Archdiocese of Chicago to a private school through an aggressive fundraising campaign.

== Awards and nominations ==
- 2009, Official Selection, International Premier Dawn Breakers International Film Festival
- 2009, Winner, "Best Documentary". Omaha Film Festival
- 2009, Winner, "Most Inspirational Documentary", Seattle True Independent Film Festival
- 2009, Winner, "Audience Choice Best Documentary", Lake County Film Festival
