= Bruktawit Tigabu =

Ethiopian television producer

- Born: 1981 (age 44–45)
- Notable work: Tibeb Girls; Tsehai Loves Learning
- Awards: Rolex Young Laurate
- Website: www.whizkidsworkshop.com

Bruktawit Tigabu Tadesse (born 1981) is an Ethiopian entrepreneur working in the field of children's education. She has been a children's TV show producer, film director, animator and school teacher.

== Career ==
Tadesse began her professional career as a primary school teacher in Ethiopia's capital, Addis Ababa. With her husband she set up Whiz Kids Workshop and began producing Tsehai Loves Learning, the first educational preschool television program in the country. The program won international awards for its educational design, quality of production, and innovative social enterprise. Tadesse is one of the founding members of Social Enterprise Ethiopia and currently serves as board chairperson.

== Whiz Kids Workshop ==
Whiz Kids Workshop is a social enterprise used to reach Ethiopia's children and young people through mass media. It uses television, radio and print media in Ethiopia to disseminate educational messages in seven local Ethiopian languages with an emphasis on early childhood education, literacy, healthy behavior and gender equality. Whiz Kids’ educational programs include Tsehai Loves Learning, Tibeb Girls, Involve Me and Little Investigators.

The organization works with several schools and trains teachers to integrate their educational programs into the classroom through DVDs and complementary learning materials. The Ethiopian Ministry of Health and Ministry of Education are part of the Content Advisory Group, providing technical and content creation support along with access to government schools for research and testing.

== Honors and awards ==
Tadesse was named a Rolex Young Laureate in 2010 for her efforts to reduce the child mortality rate in Ethiopia through public health messaging. She was #45 on Fast Company's 100 Most Creative People In Business for 2012. She was a speaker at the World Innovation Summit for Education (WISE) in 2011 and has served as a pre-jury member in 2012, 2014 and 2015. She has also been recognized as a 2018 Outstanding Social Entrepreneur of the Year by the Schwab Foundation for Social Entrepreneurship.
