= Providence St. Mel School =

Providence St. Mel

Location
- 119 South Central Park Avenue; Chicago, Illinois 60624; United States; 41°52′43.6″N 87°42′55.2″W

Information
- Type: Private, coeducational
- Founder: Paul J. Adams III
- Grades: Preschool–12
- Colors: Purple and gold
- Slogan: Work Plan Build Dream
- Team name: Knights
- Website: psmnow.com

Providence St. Mel School (PSM) is a private, coeducational Preschool-12th Grade school in East Garfield Park, Chicago, Illinois.

== History ==
The school was created in 1969 with the merger of two schools, Providence High School and St. Mel High School. In 1978 the Archdiocese of Chicago decided to close it. The principal, Paul J. Adams III, and administrators of the school chose instead to operate it as an independent school, after the Sisters of Providence of Saint Mary-of-the-Woods, owners of the school building, agreed to sell it to them for a low price.

In 1982 and 1983, President Ronald Reagan visited the school. In 1993, Oprah Winfrey donated $1,000,000.

The October 2006 issue of Chicago magazine ranked Providence St. Mel as one of the most outstanding elementary schools in the metropolitan area. The school earned a place on the magazine's "A+ Team", the list of select 115 public and 25 private elementary and middle schools.

As of 2025, the school was ranked 42 of 1,103 (Best Private K-12 Schools in Illinois) and 104 of 289 (Best Private High Schools in Illinois), with a 100% graduation rate.

== Alumni ==
- Lil Rel Howery, comedian
- Linton Johnson, professional basketball player
- Bernie Leahy (1908–1978), NFL player; attended St. Mel High School
- Lee Loughnane, trumpet player for the American rock band Chicago
- Bob Ociepka, professional basketball coach
- Tom O'Halleran, Member of the United States House of Representatives from Arizona's 1st district
- Gene Pingatore, high school basketball coach
- Carmelita Pope, actress, attended Providence High School
- Johnny Rigney, professional baseball player, attended St. Mel High School
- Frank Quilici, professional baseball player

== See also ==
- The Providence Effect, a documentary film about the school
