= Mangaliba =

Malagasy music style and dance

- Cultural origins: Traditional music of Anosy
- Typical instruments: Vocal, mandoliny, guitar, bass, kabosy, Drum kit

Mangaliba is a traditional Malagasy dance originating in the Anosy region of southeastern Madagascar.

== Origins ==
Traditionally performed during full-moon nights, village children would gather to organize Mangaliba dance competitions. Over time, the dance is now performed by people of all ages during major social and cultural events, including circumcision ceremonies, community celebrations, and national holidays.

== Artists ==
- Ange-lah
- Dadah de Fort-Dauphin
- Dian-Hay
- Hazolahy
- Rabaza
