= William Gates (basketball) =

American basketball player (born 1971)

Personal information
- Born: December 28, 1971 (age 54) Chicago, Illinois, U.S.
- Listed height: 6 ft 0 in (1.83 m)

Career information
- High school: St. Joseph (Westchester, Illinois)
- College: Marquette (1991–1995)
- NBA draft: 1995: undrafted
- Position: Guard

William Gates (born December 28, 1971) is an American former college basketball player. Gates and Arthur Agee are the two subjects of the 1994 documentary film Hoop Dreams.

== Early life and education ==
Gates was a young man from the Cabrini–Green housing projects. He and Arthur Agee hoped to have their basketball talent turned into professional careers with the NBA. The documentary Hoop Dreams followed them through their recruitment by St. Joseph High School in Westchester, Illinois. During high school, he worked hard to improve his basketball skills and his academics to the best of his ability, but he initially struggled with a low reading level. He struggled to get the required score of 18 on the ACT exam needed to earn a basketball scholarship at Marquette University and eventually managed a 17.5 aggregate score, which was rounded to 18. At St. Joseph, Gates suffered a knee injury that limited his playing and recruitment offers. He played three seasons for Marquette from 1991 to 1995. He appeared in 80 games, making 29 starts and scoring 399 points. He graduated from Marquette in 1995 with a communications degree.

== Life after college ==
In 2001, Gates worked out with NBA star Michael Jordan in preparation for Jordan's comeback and was offered a tryout with the Washington Wizards but injured his foot. His brother, Curtis Gates, also seen in the film, was murdered on September 10, 2001, after being caught in a love triangle.

After the end of his basketball career, Gates got a Bible degree at Moody Bible Institute in Chicago and became pastor at Living Faith Community Center in Cabrini-Green, a position he held until July 2012, when his family moved to the San Antonio, Texas area. Gates' eldest son (William Gates Jr.) followed in his father's basketball footsteps, averaging 23.5 points a game his senior season at Samuel Clemens High School in Schertz, Texas, and receiving a full scholarship to Furman University in South Carolina. He spent his freshman season and the first half of his sophomore season at Furman. He was named to the Southern Conference All-Freshman Team while with the Paladins. After one season, Gates Jr. transferred to Houston Baptist University, where he played his next three seasons.

In 2021 Gates connected with his Hoop Dreams co-star Arthur Agee and producer Matt Hoffar to launch Hoop Dreams The Podcast in partnership with the Unlearning Network, a Vancouver-based media company.
