= Marshall Metropolitan High School =

Public high school in Chicago, Illinois, United States

Location
- 3250 W. Adams Street; Chicago, Illinois 60624; United States; 41.8790°N 87.7073°W

Information
- School type: Public; Secondary
- Opened: 1895
- School district: Chicago Public Schools
- CEEB code: 141020
- Principal: Jammie T. Poole Jr.
- Grades: 9–12
- Gender: Coed
- Enrollment: 231 (2025–2026)
- Campus type: Urban
- Colors: Maroon; Gold
- Athletics conference: Chicago Public League
- Team name: Commandos
- Accreditation: North Central Association of Colleges and Schools
- Yearbook: The Review
- Website: marshallmetro.cps.edu

John Marshall Metropolitan High School is a public 4–year high school located in the East Garfield Park neighborhood on the west side of Chicago, Illinois, United States. Opened in 1895, Marshall is operated by the Chicago Public Schools district. Marshall is named in honor of John Marshall, the fourth Chief Justice of the Supreme Court of the United States. Marshall serves the students of the East Garfield Park, West Garfield Park, North Lawndale and Humboldt Park neighborhoods.

== Background ==
The student body is approximately 89% African American. Marshall High school is a Title I high school as determined by U.S. Department of Education standards, meaning that 40% or more of the students come from families that qualify as low income under United States Census definitions.

== Athletics ==
Marshall competes in the Chicago Public League (CPL) and is a member of the Illinois High School Association (IHSA). The school sport teams are stylized as the Commandos. The following teams finished in the top four of their respective IHSA sponsored state championship tournament: The boys' track and field placed in 3rd in 1960–61. Marshall has won eight state championships, has finished in the top four in state 18 times, and has made 24 appearances in the state final tournament; all of which are records for the state of Illinois.

=== Basketball ===
The boys' basketball team has won the state championship four times (1957–58, 1959–60, 2007–08, 2025–26), has five times placed 3rd (1960–61,1964-1965,1990–91, 2005–06, 2006–07), and twice finished 4th (1981–82, 1982–83). Courtney Hargrays, the head coach of the 07 championship team, is the only coach to win the Chicago city title and state title in his first year. The school's team figures prominently in the 1994 documentary film Hoop Dreams. The Marshall girls' basketball team has been state champions ten times (1981–82, 1984–85, 1988–89, 1989–90, 1991–92, 1992–93, 1998–99, 2007–08, 2017–18, 2018–19)and runners-up four times (1979–80, 1985–86, 1993–94, 2019-20) in addition to placing 3rd six times (1980–81, 1982–83, 1987–88, 1996–97, 1997–98, 2008–09) and 4th in 1983–84.

== Notable alumni ==
- Arthur Agee (1991) – former basketball player, best known for being profiled in documentary film Hoop Dreams
- Patrick Beverley (2006) – NBA player, formerly for the Los Angeles Clippers, Houston Rockets, Chicago Bulls, Philadelphia 76ers and the Milwaukee Bucks, now plays for Hapoel Tel Aviv of the Israeli Basketball Premier League
- Roger De Koven – actor on stage, radio, film and TV.
- Jerome Isaac Friedman (1948) – physicist awarded 1990 Nobel Prize in Physics for his work that led to the discovery of quarks
- Larry Friend – NBA player
- Larry Gelbart (attended) – Tony and Emmy Award-winning writer
- Stuart M. Kaminsky (1953) – mystery writer who wrote novels
- William J. Keester (1907) – Rear Admiral in the United States Coast Guard
- Cleve Killingsworth (1966) – served as Chairman, President, and CEO of Blue Cross and Blue Shield of MA
- Benjamin Libet – scientist in the field of human consciousness
- Peter Lisagor (1934) – journalist who served as Washington, D.C., bureau chief for the Chicago Daily News (1959–76)
- Dr. Harry Martin (1908) – medical director of 20th Century Fox Studios
- Alfonzo McKinnie (2010) – NBA player, most notably for the Golden State Warriors.
- Odas Nicholson (1942) – attorney, judge and delegate to the Illinois Constitutional Convention
- Shauneille Perry (1946) – stage director, playwright, and actress
- Cappie Pondexter (2001) – All-Star WNBA guard, playing for Chicago Sky
- Julius B. Richmond (1935) – 12th Surgeon General of the United States (1977–81)
- Edward Ricketts (1914) – marine biologist, inspiration for the character "Doc" in John Steinbeck's Cannery Row
- Hyman G. Rickover (1918) – Admiral in the United States Navy, described as "Father of the Nuclear Navy,"
- Vincent Starrett – news reporter and author
- Darryl Stingley (1970) – NFL wide receiver (1973–77), played his entire pro career with New England Patriots
- Keifer Sykes (2011) – NBA guard
- Carleton Washburne (attended) – author and prominent proponent of progressive education
- Kim Williams (1993) – WNBA basketball player
- George Wilson (1960) – former NBA center (1964–71)

== Notable staff ==
- Dorothy Gaters – Girls basketball coach at the school since 1975. She has led the team to over 900 victories, and in 2009 became the third girls' basketball coach to receive the Morgan Wooten Lifetime Achievement Award from the Naismith Memorial Basketball Hall of Fame.
