= Isiah Thomas =

American basketball player (born 1961)

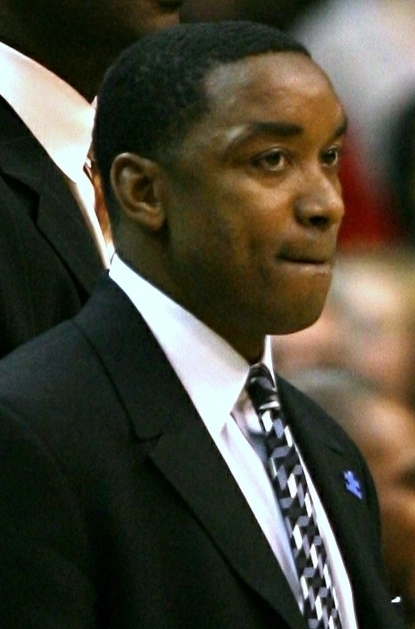
- Thomas in 2007

Personal information
- Born: April 30, 1961 (age 65) Chicago, Illinois, U.S.
- Listed height: 6 ft 1 in (1.85 m)
- Listed weight: 180 lb (82 kg)

Career information
- High school: St. Joseph (Westchester, Illinois)
- College: Indiana (1979–1981)
- NBA draft: 1981: 1st round, 2nd overall pick
- Drafted by: Detroit Pistons
- Playing career: 1981–1994
- Position: Point guard
- Number: 11
- Coaching career: 2000–2012

Career history

Playing
- 1981–1994: Detroit Pistons

Coaching
- 2000–2003: Indiana Pacers
- 2006–2008: New York Knicks
- 2009–2012: FIU

Career highlights
- As player: 2× NBA champion (1989, 1990); NBA Finals MVP (1990); 12× NBA All-Star (1982–1993); 2× NBA All-Star Game MVP (1984, 1986); 3× All-NBA First Team (1984–1986); 2× All-NBA Second Team (1983, 1987); NBA All-Rookie First Team (1982); NBA assists leader (1985); NBA anniversary team (50th, 75th); No. 11 retired by Detroit Pistons; NCAA champion (1981); NCAA Final Four Most Outstanding Player (1981); Consensus first-team All-American (1981); USA Basketball Male Athlete of the Year (1980); First-team Parade All-American (1979); McDonald's All-American (1979); As coach: NBA All-Star Game head coach (2003)

Career NBA playing statistics
- Points: 18,822 (19.2 ppg)
- Assists: 9,061 (9.3 apg)
- Steals: 1,861 (1.9 spg)
- Stats at NBA.com
- Stats at Basketball Reference

Career coaching record
- NBA: 187–223 (.456)
- College: 26–65 (.286)
- Record at Basketball Reference
- Basketball Hall of Fame
- Collegiate Basketball Hall of Fame
Medals
Men's basketball
Representing the United States
Pan American Games
Gold medal – first place	1979 San Juan	Team competition

Isiah Lord Thomas III (/aɪˈzeɪ.ə/ eye-ZAY-ə; born April 30, 1961), also known as "Zeke", is an American former professional basketball player who is a current analyst for NBA TV and Fox Sports. He played his entire professional career for the Detroit Pistons of the National Basketball Association (NBA). Widely regarded as one of the greatest point guards of all time, Thomas was a two-time NBA champion, an NBA Finals MVP recipient, a five-time All-NBA Team member, a 12-time NBA All-Star with two All-Star Game MVP awards and the 1985 NBA assist leader. He was named to the NBA's 50th and 75th anniversary teams, and inducted into the Naismith Memorial Basketball Hall of Fame in 2000. From 2000 to 2012 he coached the Indiana Pacers, New York Knicks, and FIU.

Thomas played college basketball for the Indiana Hoosiers, leading them to the 1981 NCAA championship as a sophomore and declaring for the NBA draft. He was taken as the second overall pick by the Pistons in the 1981 NBA draft, and played for them his entire career, while leading the "Bad Boys" to the 1988–89 and 1989–90 NBA championships.

Following his playing career, Thomas was an executive with the Toronto Raptors, a television commentator, the owner of the Continental Basketball Association, the head coach of the Indiana Pacers, and an executive and head coach for the New York Knicks. He later served as men's basketball coach for the Florida International University (FIU) Golden Panthers for three seasons from 2009 to 2012. Thomas was a president and part owner of the Knicks' WNBA sister team, the New York Liberty, from 2015 to 2019.

== Early life ==
Isiah Lord Thomas III is the son of Isiah Thomas II and Mary Thomas. The youngest of 9 children, Thomas was born on April 30, 1961, in Chicago, Illinois, and grew up on the city's West Side. He started playing basketball at age three and would dribble and shoot baskets as the halftime entertainment at Catholic Youth Organization games.

Thomas's father, Isiah Thomas II, was an army veteran wounded in the Battle of Saipan. He later attended trade school, eventually becoming the first black supervisor at International Harvester in Chicago. When the plant closed, the only work he could find was as a janitor; the family fell into hardship. Isiah Thomas II left the family when Isiah was a young child.

Isiah Thomas III attended Our Lady of Sorrows School and St. Joseph High School in Westchester, which was a 90-minute commute from his home. Playing under coach Gene Pingatore, he led St. Joseph to the state finals in his junior year.

His mother Mary was the subject of an Emmy award-winning television film in 1989, A Mother's Courage: The Mary Thomas Story.

== College career ==
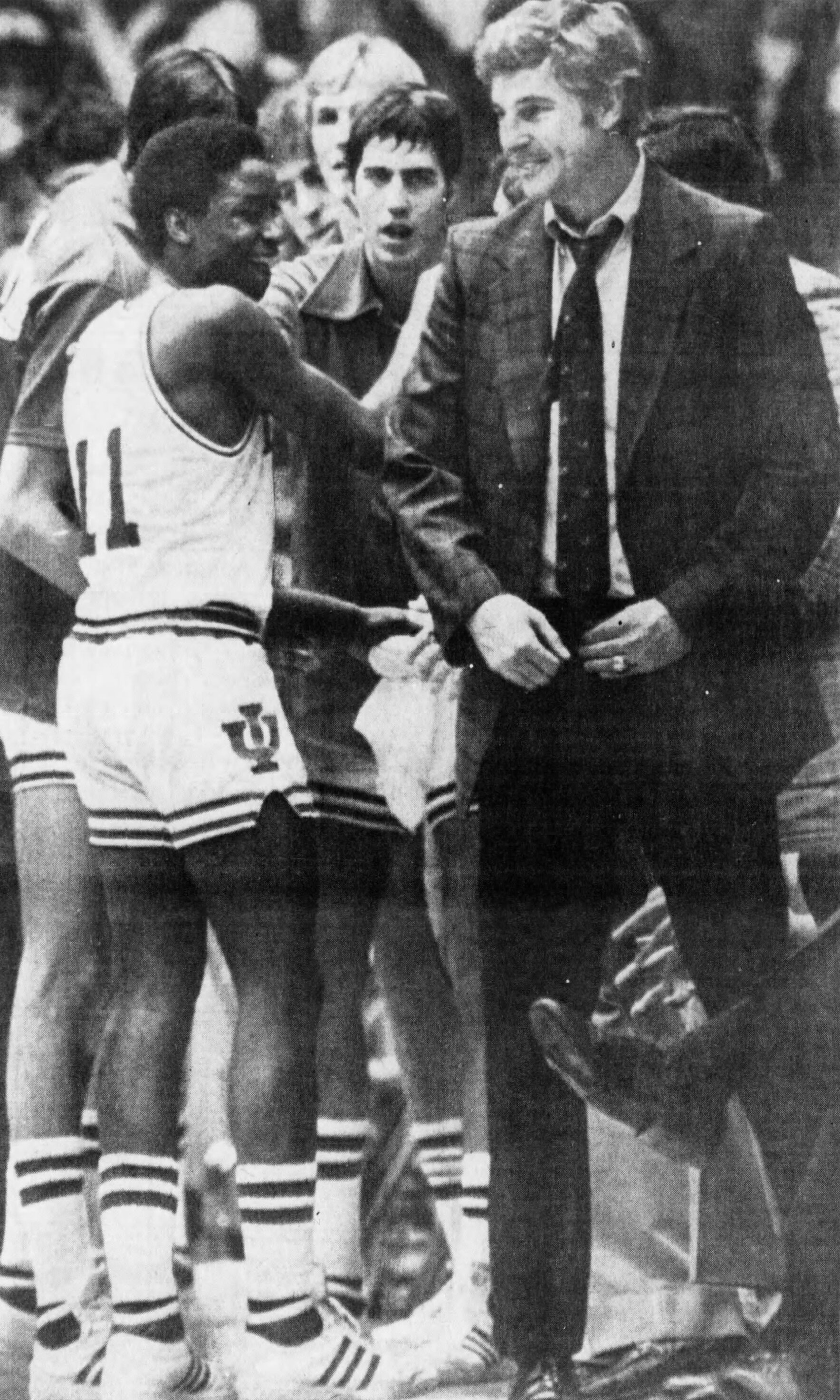
Thomas with Indiana coach Bob Knight during the 1981 NCAA tournament

Thomas was recruited to play college basketball for Bob Knight and the Indiana Hoosiers. Thomas's mother chose Knight and Indiana.

Thomas had to adjust to Knight's disciplinarian style. Thomas quickly proved his skills as a player and became a favorite with both Knight and Indiana fans. Fans nicknamed him "Mr. Wonderful." "Pee Wee" was Knight's nickname for Thomas. Thomas and Mike Woodson led the Hoosiers to the Big Ten championship and advanced to the 1980 Sweet Sixteen.

That year, Thomas and the Hoosiers once again won a conference title. In addition, the team won the 1981 NCAA tournament, the school's fourth national title. The sophomore earned the tournament's Most Outstanding Player award and made himself eligible for the upcoming NBA draft.

== Professional career ==
=== Detroit Pistons (1981–1994) ===
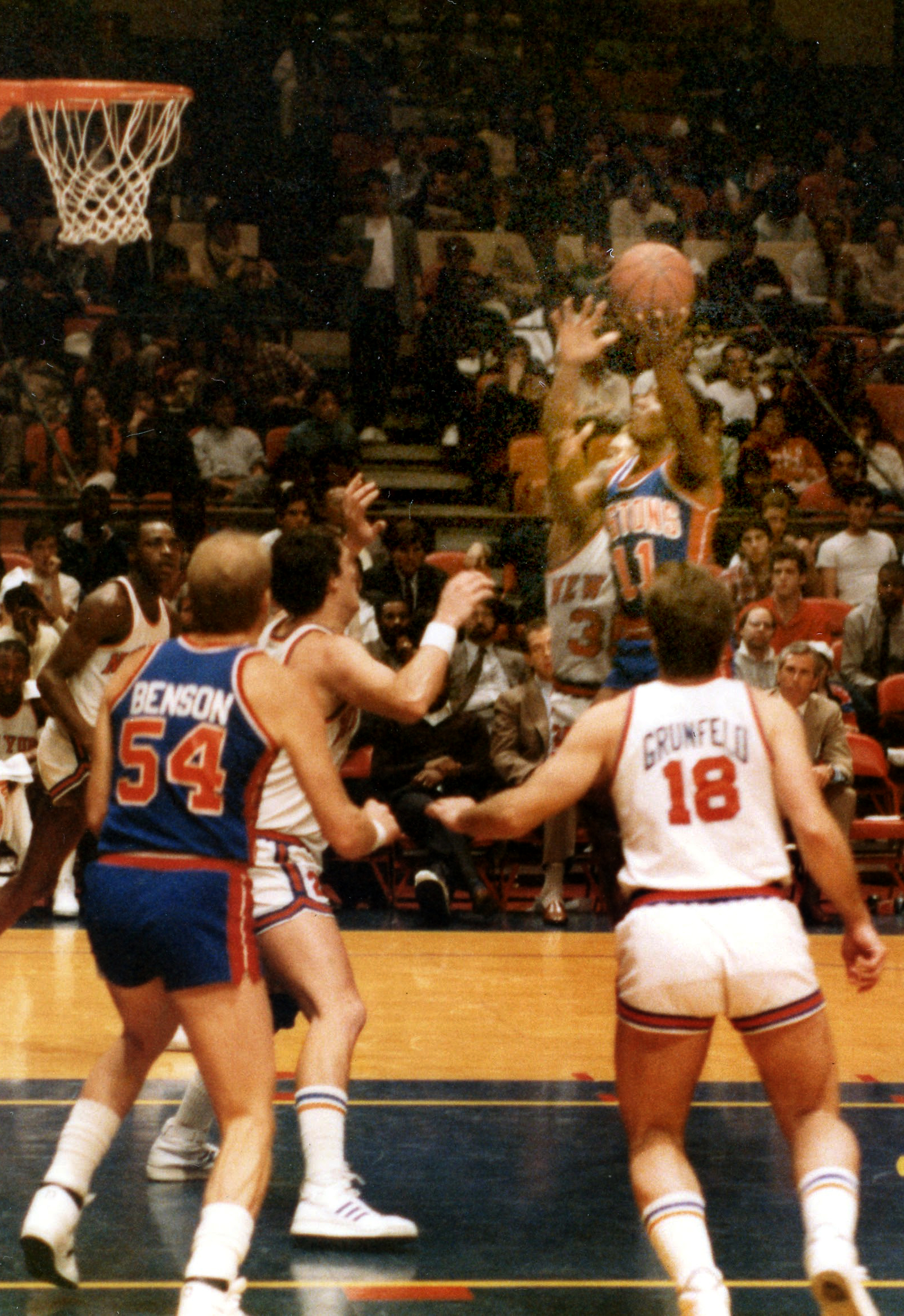
Thomas competing for the Detroit Pistons against the New York Knicks at Madison Square Garden in New York in 1985

In the 1981 NBA draft, the Detroit Pistons chose Thomas with the second overall pick and signed him to a four-year, $1.6 million contract. Thomas wore a No. 11 jersey because his favorite youth basketball player, Sammy Puckett, had also done so. Thomas started for the Eastern Conference in the 1982 NBA All-Star Game and made the All-Rookie Team.

On December 13, 1983, Thomas scored 47 points and recorded 17 assists during a 186–184 triple overtime win over the Denver Nuggets. In the opening round of the 1984 NBA playoffs, Thomas and the Pistons faced off against Bernard King and the New York Knicks. In the pivotal fifth game, Thomas scored 16 points in 94 seconds to force the game into overtime, but then fouled out, and the Knicks held on to win.

In the 1985 NBA playoffs, Thomas and his team went to the conference semifinals against the 15-time NBA champion Boston Celtics led by future Hall of Famers Larry Bird, Kevin McHale, Robert Parish, and Dennis Johnson. Detroit would not shake the Celtics in their six-game series, eventually losing.

In the 1987 NBA playoffs, Thomas and the Pistons went to the Eastern Conference Finals and faced the Celtics again. It was the furthest the team had advanced since moving from Fort Wayne. Detroit tied the Celtics at two games apiece, but its hope of winning Game 5 at Boston Garden was dashed by Larry Bird. After a Celtics turnover with 5 seconds remaining and the Pistons clinging to a 1-point lead, Thomas attempted to quickly inbound the ball, Bird stole the pass and hit Dennis Johnson for the game-winning layup.

In 1988, the Pistons finally defeated the Celtics in the Eastern Conference Finals and advanced to their first Finals in 32 years, in which many of the Celtics players walked off without shaking hands. Only Kevin McHale, while talking to Isiah, can be found shaking hands. That year they faced the Los Angeles Lakers, led by Magic Johnson, James Worthy, and Kareem Abdul-Jabbar. Before the series, Thomas and Johnson exchanged a courtside kiss on the cheek prior to tip-off as a sign of their deep friendship. After taking a 3–2 series lead back to Los Angeles, Detroit appeared poised to win their first NBA title in Game 6.

One of Thomas's most inspiring and self-defining moments came in Game 6. Although he had severely sprained his ankle late in the game, Thomas continued to play. While hobbling and in obvious pain, Thomas scored 25 points in the third quarter, an NBA Finals record. But the Lakers won the game 103–102 on a pair of last-minute free throws by Abdul-Jabbar, following a controversial foul called on Bill Laimbeer. With Thomas unable to compete at full strength, the Lakers were able to take advantage and clinched their second consecutive title in Game 7, 108–105.

In the 1988–89 season, Thomas, along with teammates Joe Dumars, Rick Mahorn, Vinnie Johnson, Dennis Rodman, James Edwards, John Salley, Bill Laimbeer, and Mark Aguirre, guided his team to a 63–19 record. Detroit played a brash and dominating brand of basketball through the playoffs that led to their nickname "Bad Boys". First, they defeated Boston, which had been suffering persistent injuries. After being down 2–1 against Michael Jordan and the up-and-coming Chicago Bulls in the Conference Finals, the Pistons utilized the Jordan Rules to limit Jordan's impact, which allowed them to defeat the Bulls in six games and advance to the finals yet again, setting up an NBA Finals rematch with the Lakers. This time the Pistons dominated, sweeping the Lakers in four games to win their first of back-to-back championships.

In the 1989–90 season, Thomas and the Pistons had another dominant run. They finished the regular season as the #1 seed for the second straight year. After sweeping the Pacers and defeating the Knicks in five games, Thomas and the Pistons faced a tough seven-game series against the Bulls in the Eastern Conference Finals. The Pistons prevailed and advanced to their third straight finals. The Pistons repeated as champions, by defeating Clyde Drexler's Portland Trail Blazers. Thomas was voted NBA Finals Most Valuable Player of the 1990 NBA Finals after averaging 27.6 points, 7.0 assists, and 5.2 rebounds per game.

The 1990–91 season proved to be a struggle, as the team went through some injuries, with Thomas only playing 49 games in the regular season because of a wrist injury. The Pistons would win 50 games. Despite advancing to the Eastern Conference Finals, they were no match for a more developed and determined Bulls who swept the two-time defending champions. In the last 7.9 seconds of Game 4, Thomas and most of his teammates walked off the court without shaking any of the Bulls' hands.

In 1992, the Pistons made it to the playoffs, but were eliminated in five games by the New York Knicks in the first round. In 1993, the Pistons won just 40 games, missing the playoffs for the first time since the 1982–83 season. In the following season, an aging and ailing Thomas tore his Achilles tendon on April 19, 1994, forcing him to retire a month later.

=== Rivalries ===
In the 1985 NBA All-Star Game, Thomas was joined on the Eastern Conference squad by star rookie Michael Jordan. Jordan wound up attempting nine shots, relatively few for a starting player. Afterward, many veteran East players were accused of having planned to "freeze out" Jordan from their offense by not passing him the ball, supposedly out of spite over the attention Jordan was receiving. No player involved has ever confirmed that the freeze-out occurred, but the story has long been reported. Thomas has ridiculed the idea that he masterminded the supposed freeze-out as "ludicrous", pointing out that he was a relatively young player on a team that included Larry Bird, Julius Erving and Moses Malone. During Jordan's Hall of Fame induction, in which Thomas introduced John Stockton, who was also being inducted, Jordan dismissed the claims about a freeze-out having taken place, saying "I was just happy to be there, being the young guy surrounded by all these greats, I just wanted to prove myself and I hope that I did prove myself to you guys."

In 1987, following a playoff loss to the Boston Celtics, Thomas was asked if he agreed with Dennis Rodman's comments that Larry Bird was overrated because he was white; Thomas agreed that if Bird was Black he "would be just another good guy" instead of being portrayed as the league's best player. Thomas later said he was joking and just supporting his teammate.

In the Eastern Conference Finals of the 1991 NBA playoffs, the two-time defending champion Detroit Pistons faced the Jordan-led Chicago Bulls in the playoffs for the fourth consecutive season. The Pistons had eliminated the Bulls in each of the three previous years, but this time they suffered a four-game sweep at the hands of the Bulls (who would win the first of three consecutive, and six overall, NBA championships between 1991 and 1998). The series was marked by a number of verbal and physical confrontations. With 7.9 seconds remaining in the fourth game, Laimbeer organized a walk-out and Thomas and all of his teammates—except Joe Dumars and John Salley—walked off the court, refusing to shake hands with the Bulls, replicating what was done to them by the Celtics teams before. In 1992, Thomas was passed over for the Dream Team apparently because of his strained relationship with Jordan.

In September 2009, during Jordan's Hall of Fame acceptance speech, Jordan thanked Thomas and others for giving him the motivation he needed to compete in the NBA.

== National team career ==
Thomas was selected to the 1980 Olympic U.S. basketball team, but like all American athletes, he was not able to play in Moscow due to the Olympics boycott. The boycotting countries instead participated in the "Gold Medal Series", a series of games against NBA teams, a French team and the 1976 Olympic gold medal team in various U.S. cities, recording a 5–1 record (losing only to the Seattle SuperSonics). Thomas shot 22–55 from the field and 14–17 from the line. He led the U.S. in assists with 37 (the next highest total on the team was 17) and averaged 9.7 points per game. In 2007, Thomas received one of 461 Congressional Gold Medals created especially for the spurned athletes.

Despite his talent, Thomas was left off the original Olympic Dream Team, possibly as a result of an alleged feud with Michael Jordan. In the book When the Game Was Ours, Magic Johnson relates that he, Jordan and other players conspired to keep Thomas off the Dream Team.

After Tim Hardaway left the team due to injury, Thomas was named to Dream Team II for the 1994 World Championship of Basketball, but did not play due to his Achilles tendon injury that eventually led to his retirement. He was replaced by Kevin Johnson.

== Coaching and executive career ==
=== Toronto Raptors ===
After his playing career ended, Thomas became part owner and executive vice president of the expansion Toronto Raptors in 1994. In 1998, he left the organization after a dispute with new management over the franchise's direction and his future responsibilities. During his tenure with the team, the Raptors drafted Damon Stoudamire, Marcus Camby, and high schooler Tracy McGrady.

=== Indiana Pacers (2000–2003) ===
Thomas was hired as head coach of the Indiana Pacers on July 20, 2000. He succeeded Larry Bird, who previously coached the Pacers to the Eastern Conference title. Thomas attempted to bring up young talents such as Jermaine O'Neal, Jamaal Tinsley, Al Harrington, and Jeff Foster. But under Thomas the Pacers were not able to stay at the elite level as they went through the transition from a veteran-dominated, playoff-experienced team to a younger, less experienced team. In Thomas's first two seasons with the Pacers, the team was eliminated in the first round by the Philadelphia 76ers and the New Jersey Nets, both of whom eventually made the NBA Finals.

In his last year with the Pacers, Thomas guided them to a 48–34 record in the regular season and coached the Eastern Conference team at the 2003 NBA All-Star Game. As the third seed, the Pacers were eliminated in the first round of the playoffs by the sixth-seeded Boston Celtics. With blossoming talents such as Jermaine O'Neal, Brad Miller, Ron Artest, Al Harrington and Jamaal Tinsley, along with the veteran leadership of Reggie Miller, some perceived Thomas's lack of coaching experience as the Pacers' stumbling block.

In the off-season, Bird returned to the Pacers as president of basketball operations, and his first act was to replace Thomas with Rick Carlisle. Thomas was fired by Bird on August 27, 2003.

=== New York Knicks (2006–2008) ===
On December 22, 2003, the New York Knicks hired Thomas as president of basketball operations. Thomas was ultimately unsuccessful with the Knicks' roster and fanbase. At the end of the 2005–06 season, the Knicks had the highest payroll in the league and the second-worst record. He traded away several future draft picks to Chicago in a deal for Eddy Curry including what turned out to be two lottery picks in talent-rich drafts, LaMarcus Aldridge, and Joakim Noah.

In January 2006, Anucha Browne Sanders, a female former executive with the New York Knicks, filed an employment and harassment lawsuit against The Madison Square Garden Company, alleging in part that Thomas had sexually harassed her in the workplace and that she had been fired in retaliation for complaining about the harassment. In October 2007, a federal jury ruled that Thomas had indeed sexually harassed Browne Sanders, and that Madison Square Gardens fired her in retaliation for complaining about it. The jury awarded $11.6 million in damages from the Garden and its owner, James Dolan. The case was settled for $11.5 million ahead of the case concluding before U.S. District Judge Gerard E. Lynch.

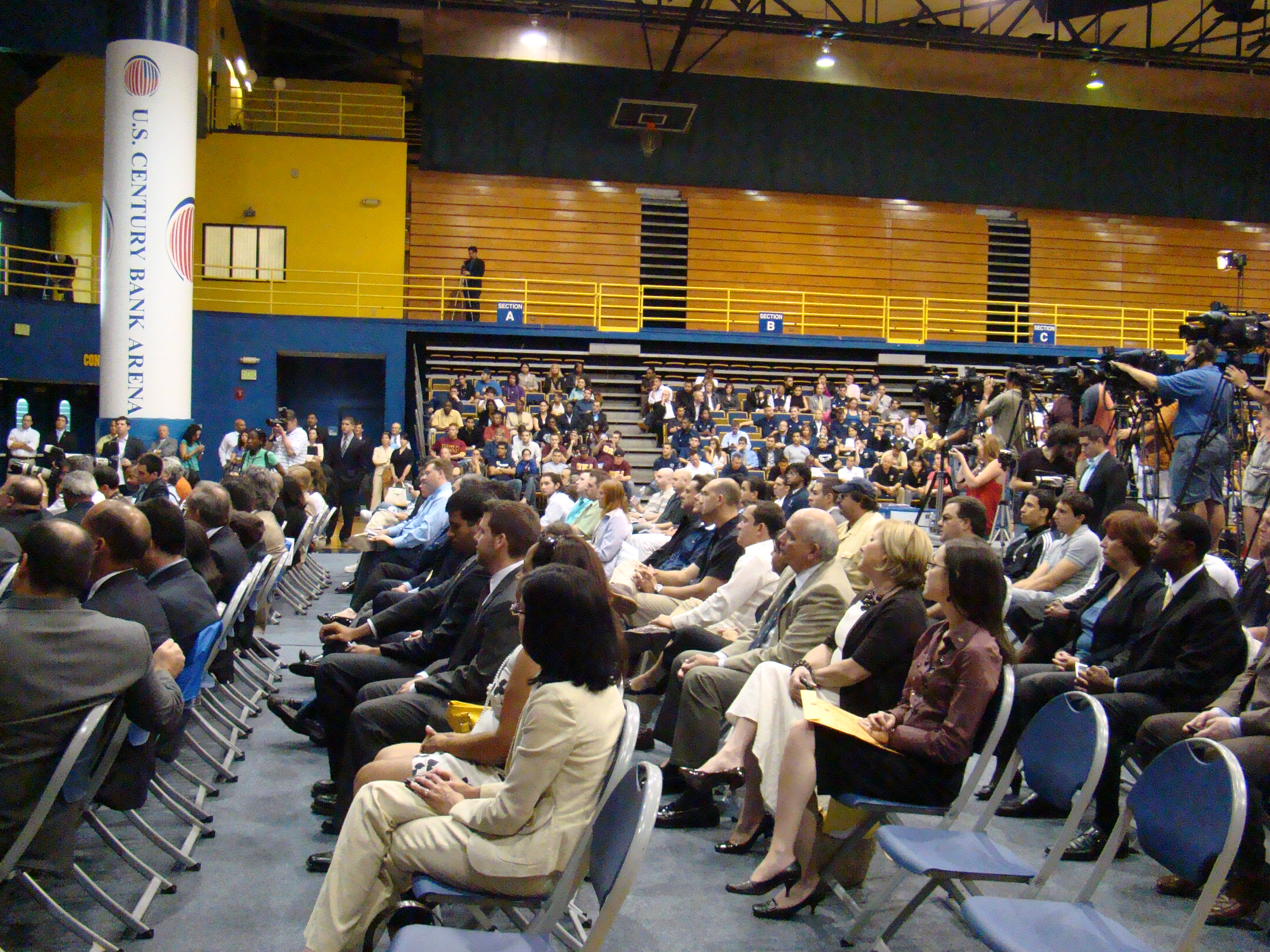
A press conference for Thomas at the U.S. Century Bank Arena at Florida International University in Miami

On June 22, 2006, the Knicks fired coach Larry Brown, and owner James Dolan replaced him with Thomas on the condition that he show "evident progress" or be fired.

During the following season the Knicks became embroiled in a brawl with the Denver Nuggets that Thomas allegedly instigated by ordering his players to commit a hard foul in the paint. He was not fined or suspended; NBA Commissioner David Stern said that he relied only on "definitive information" when handing out punishments. Later in the season, nine months after Dolan had demanded "evident progress", the Knicks re-signed Thomas to an undisclosed "multi-year" contract. After Thomas was granted the extension, the Knicks abruptly fell from playoff contention with a dismal finish to the season.

During the 2007 NBA draft, Thomas made another trade, acquiring Zach Randolph, Fred Jones, and Dan Dickau from the Portland Trail Blazers for Steve Francis and Channing Frye.

Thomas also compounded the Knicks' salary-cap problems by signing fringe players such as Jerome James and Jared Jeffries to full mid-level exception contracts. Neither player saw any significant playing time and both were often injured and highly ineffective when able to play.

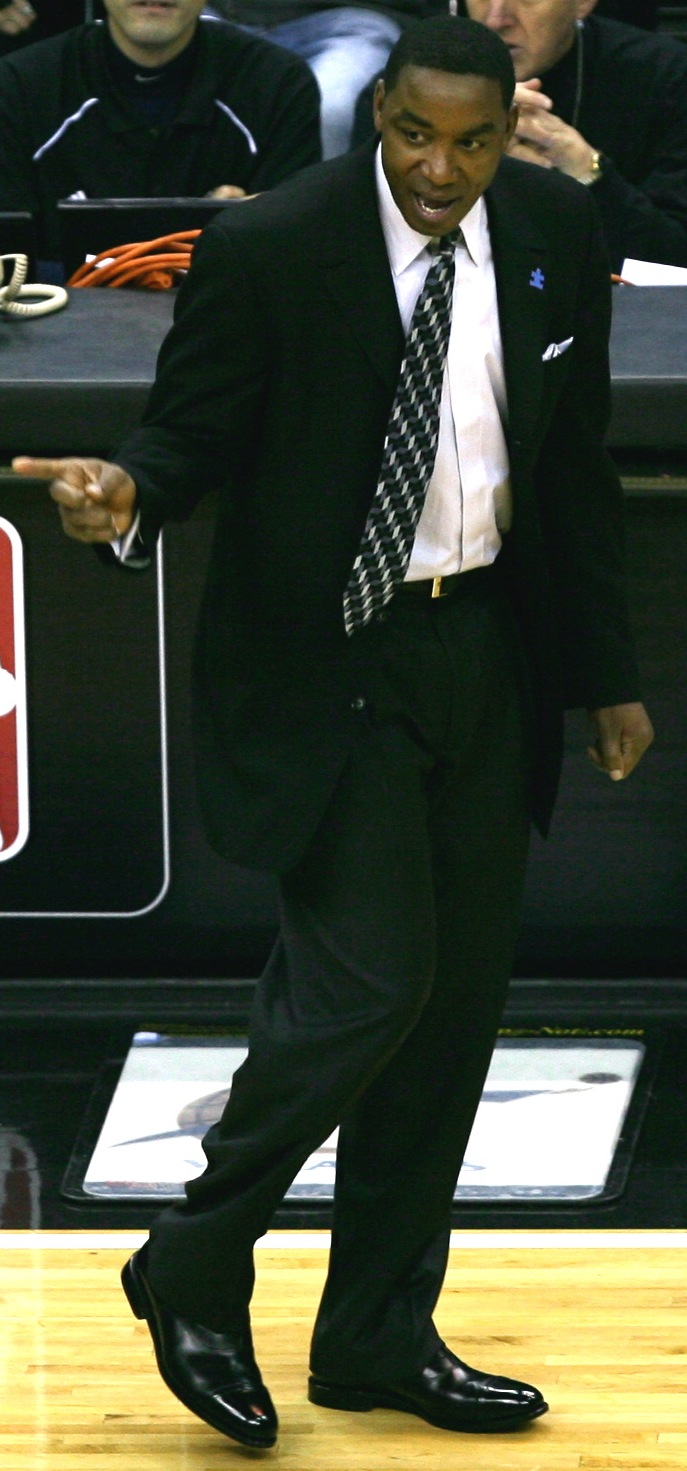
Thomas coaching the Knicks in 2007

Despite the constant criticism he received from Knicks fans, Thomas maintained that he had no intention of leaving until he turned the team around. He predicted he would lead the Knicks to a championship, stating that his goal was to leave behind a "championship legacy" with the Knicks just as he had done for the Detroit Pistons.

On April 2, 2008, Donnie Walsh was introduced to replace Thomas as president of basketball operations for the Knicks. One night after the Knicks tied a franchise record of 59 losses and ended their season, news broke that Thomas had been told he would not return as Knicks head coach the following season. He was officially "reassigned" on April 18 "after a season of listless and dreadful basketball, a tawdry lawsuit and unending chants from fans demanding his dismissal". Thomas posted an overall winning percentage of .341 as head coach of the Knicks, fifth lowest in team history. As part of the reassignment agreement, Thomas was to serve as a consultant to the team, reporting directly to Walsh. He was banned from having contact with Knicks players on the grounds that he could undermine his successor.

=== FIU (2009–2012) ===
On April 14, 2009, Thomas accepted an offer to become the head basketball coach of FIU, replacing Sergio Rouco after five losing seasons.

After posting a 7–25 record in his first season at FIU, on August 6, 2010, Thomas announced that he was taking a job as consultant to the New York Knicks, while keeping his position as head coach at FIU. According to the New York Daily News, "nearly every major media outlet panned the announcement of Thomas' hire", and it led to a "public outcry" among fans. In a reversal on August 11, Thomas announced that he would not be working with the Knicks because holding both jobs violated NBA bylaws.

Thomas finished his second season at FIU with an 11–19 record (5–11 in conference games). On April 6, 2012, FIU fired Thomas after he went 26–65 in three seasons. Under Thomas, FIU never won more than 11 games in a season.

=== New York Liberty ===
On May 5, 2015, the WNBA New York Liberty hired Thomas as team president, overseeing all of the franchise's business and basketball operations. On June 22, 2015, the Liberty and the WNBA agreed to suspend consideration of Thomas's ownership application. He remained president of the team.

Under Thomas's leadership as team president, and with his former Pistons teammate Bill Laimbeer as head coach, the Liberty finished first in the Eastern Conference during the 2015 season.

Thomas was relieved of his duties with the Liberty on February 21, 2019, after James Dolan sold the Liberty to Joseph Tsai.

== Other ventures ==
=== Business ===
Thomas's business career began during his career with the Pistons. Planning for life after the NBA, Thomas invested in a host of ventures through his private investment company out of Michigan, Isiah Investments, LLC. His primary investment was a large chain of printing franchises, American Speedy Printing Centers Inc. Thomas took a very hands-on approach at American Speedy, helping lead the company out of bankruptcy to become profitable and one of the largest printing franchises in the world.

Thomas is the founding chairman and CEO of Isiah International LLC, a holding company with a diverse portfolio of business ventures and investments. Gre3n Waste Removal, Re3 Recycling, and Eleven Capital Group are three of the primary businesses in the Isiah International family of companies.

In 1998, Thomas founded a company serving consumers, retailers, and corporations with online gift certificates and other i-commerce products. Isiah.com also had a partnership with the NBA store.

In April 1999, Thomas became the first African-American elected to the board of governors of the Chicago Stock Exchange. He served until 2002.

In addition to these business ventures, Thomas has been involved in real estate projects in Chicago and the surrounding region as the owner of Isiah Real Estate. In 2013, Thomas said he was putting money in distressed areas and reinvesting: "I'm hoping I can be a catalyst for change in those areas, to get the population back into those communities and be a catalyst to make a difference." As of 2015, Thomas was involved in a $300 million development deal for a mixed-use complex at the Illinois Medical District Commission. Isiah Real Estate partnered with Higgins Development Partners, Thomas Samuels Enterprises, and East Lake Management & Development to develop 9.5 acres (3.8 ha) of land that would include retail space, a hotel, apartments and parking areas.

Thomas was one of the founding members of the advisory board for Marquis Jet Partners and a partner of Dale and Thomas Popcorn.

Since 2021, Thomas has served as a Director at United Wholesale Mortgage (UWM), owned by Mat Ishbia (owner of the Phoenix Suns since 2022). Initially listed as an Independent Board Member, in 2024 UWM altered Thomas' status in an SEC filing to remove the designation of independence.

Thomas has served as CEO and executive chairman of the board of directors of One World Products, a cannabis company based in the U.S. with cultivation and processing facilities in Colombia.

=== CBA ===
Thomas purchased the Continental Basketball Association (CBA) for $10 million in 1999.

When at the CBA, Thomas launched partnerships with Enlighten Sports and the University of Colorado and the CBA. The new websites allowed fans to watch live game webcasts, use live shot charts, chat with players and more. Thomas said the internet was an "integral part of [the CBA's] strategy to provide engaging and entertaining content for fans." Thomas also launched a partnership between the CBA and SEASONTICKET.com to bring personalized video highlights and scores to fans across the country as well as be a portal for All-Star League voting. Thomas believed that streaming video would be the future of news and entertainment.

During Thomas's tenure, the budget for the CBA league office reportedly doubled. When Thomas became head coach of the Indiana Pacers in 2000, he was required by NBA rules to sell the CBA. The NBA offered to buy the league from Thomas, but he declined. The NBA then started its own minor league, depriving the CBA "of its lifeblood, a $2 million annual payment the NBA made to retain the CBA as its official developmental league". After Thomas placed the league into a blind trust, its funds ran out. In February 2001, the league was forced into bankruptcy and folded.

The New York Times asserted that Thomas's "foray into league ownership became a case study in how not to run a business".

=== Cheurlin Champagne ===
In 2016, Thomas announced that he was the exclusive United States importer of the Cheurlin Champagne brand through ISIAH Imports, a subsidiary of ISIAH International, LLC. Cheurlin Champagne made its debut in the United States at the 2016 Democratic National Convention in Philadelphia. Other activations have included a private luncheon honoring former President Bill Clinton. In 2017, Cheurlin debuted at The Palace of Auburn Hills for the final season of the Detroit Pistons at the historic arena. Cheurlin produces two champagne categories: Cheurlin's Brut Speciale and Rose de Saignee and Cheurlin Thomas's "Celebrite" Blanc de Blanc and "Le Champion" Blanc de Noir. In August 2017, Thomas brought his Cheurlin Flagship Collection portfolio of Champagnes to the Bellagio in Las Vegas.

== In media ==
=== Broadcasting ===
After leaving the Raptors, Thomas became a television commentator (first as the lead game analyst with play-by-play man Bob Costas and then as part of the studio team) for the NBA on NBC. He also worked a three-man booth with Costas and Doug Collins.

On December 19, 2012, NBA TV announced that Thomas would begin work on December 21, 2012, as a member of the studio analyst panel. It was also announced that Thomas would become a regular contributor for NBA.com.

Since 2017, Thomas has been a regular panelist during TNT's Monday coverage Players Only, which features only former NBA players as studio analysts, play-by-play announcers, and color analysts for games.

=== Acting ===
Thomas had a guest appearance on the 1990s television comedy Home Improvement, playing himself in Season 3 episode 2 (titled "Aisle See You in My Dreams"). He further appeared as himself in a basketball themed episode of the police procedural Due South in 1997 (season 2, episode 13, titled "White Men Can't Jump to Conclusions").

== Education ==
Thomas graduated from Indiana University with a B.A. in 1987. He received his Master's in Education from the UC Berkeley Graduate School of Education in 2013. At UC Berkeley, Thomas studied the connection between education and sports, specifically how American society makes education accessible (or inaccessible) to black male college athletes.

== Philanthropic work ==
In 1987, when he was a Piston, Thomas organized the "No Crime Day" in Detroit. He had the help of Detroit Mayor Coleman Young to call for a moratorium on crime in the summer of 1986.

Thomas founded Mary's Court, a foundation that supports economically disadvantaged parents and children on the West Side of Chicago. The charity is named for Thomas's mother. Mary's Court has teamed up with another Chicago-based charity, Kids off the Block, to serve meals to Chicago children and families during Thanksgiving.

While Thomas was at FIU, Thomas and Mary's Court donated $50,000 to FIU's First Generation Scholarship and organized a sell-out charity game during the NBA lockout featuring NBA stars LeBron James and Dwyane Wade. A street on Chicago's West Side was named in honor of his mother.

The Dr. Martin Luther King Jr. Boys & Girls Club of Chicago honored Thomas with the organization's King Legacy Award at their 24th Annual King Legacy Awards Gala.

In July 2012, Thomas joined The Black Men's Roundtable in Florida along with other national and local black leaders to discuss issues that directly affect black males.

The Peace League is an annual community basketball league within the Chicago area established by Thomas and Father Michael Pfleger in 2011. In September 2012, Thomas co-hosted the Ballin' for Peace Tournament at St. Sabina Church in Chicago to reduce gang violence through communication and basketball.

The Peace League initiative expanded into a program which offers GED classes, employment training, and internship opportunities. The surrounding Auburn-Gresham neighborhood has seen a drastic drop in violence since the league began. The Peace League Tournament was expanded to New York City during the 2015 NBA All-Star Weekend. The New York City Peace Game featured over 50 players from across all five boroughs that competed in a tournament as well as a brief speaking program with special guests that included Harry Belafonte.

In March 2013, Children Uniting Nations, an organization that focuses on advocacy/awareness and provides academic and community-based programs for at-risk and foster youth, presented Thomas and Mary's Court with the Lifetime Achievement Award for his passion and commitment to improving the lives of children.

Each year, Mary's Court provides gifts, clothing and educational items to hundreds of children in Chicago at its Holiday Toy Giveaway.

=== Humanity of Connection Award ===
On February 13, 2017, Thomas was presented the AT&T Humanity of Connection Award at the Smithsonian's National Museum of African American History and Culture in Washington, D.C. He was honored for his historic achievements in sports and his contributions to the African American community.

== Personal life ==
Thomas met his future wife, Lynn Kendall, the daughter of a Secret Service agent and a nurse, in the early 1980s while they were both attending Indiana University. The couple married at Our Lady of Sorrows in 1985. Thomas and Kendall had a son, Joshua, in 1988, and a daughter, Lauren, in 1991.

=== Paternity case ===
Two months before Thomas's marriage to Lynn Kendall in 1985, Jenni Dones, a woman from Bloomfield Hills, Michigan, filed a paternity lawsuit against Thomas. Dones alleged that she had become pregnant following a three- or four-month "intimate, exclusive, ongoing relationship" with Thomas. Dones's child, Marc E. T. Dones, was born in 1986. After a long-running legal dispute, Thomas agreed to pay a settlement as well as monthly payments. In 1995, Dones obtained additional financial support from Thomas in a separate lawsuit. Marc Dones has been described by the literary site thedetroiter.com as "a talented writer and poet". He served as chief executive officer of the King County (WA) Regional Homelessness Authority.

== Legacy and accolades ==
During his playing career, Thomas won an NCAA championship with Indiana in 1981 and NBA championships with Detroit in 1989 and 1990. He was selected as the Most Outstanding Player of the 1981 Final Four and the Most Valuable Player of the 1990 NBA Finals. He was a consensus first-team All-American in 1980 and a 12-time NBA All-Star.

When Thomas retired as a player in 1994, he ranked third in NBA history with 9,061 assists and fifth in league history with 1,861 steals. As of 2023, his 9,061 assists rank tenth in NBA history, and his average of 9.3 assists per game ranks fifth.

As of 2020, Thomas also remains the Pistons' all-time career leader in minutes played (15,904), points scored (18,822), steals (1,861), and assists (9,061).

In February 1996, the Pistons retired Thomas's jersey No. 11.

In 1996, Thomas was named to the 50 Greatest Players in NBA History, selected upon the 50th anniversary of the founding of the NBA. In 2021, he was elected to the NBA 75th Anniversary Team.

Thomas has been inducted into the following halls of fame:

- In 1993, Thomas was inducted into the Indiana University Athletics Hall of Fame.
- In 1998, he was inducted along with Magic Johnson into the Michigan Sports Hall of Fame.
- In May 2000, he was elected to the Naismith Memorial Basketball Hall of Fame in his first year of eligibility.

Michael Jordan called Thomas the second greatest point guard ever, only behind Magic Johnson. Thomas was inducted into the American Basketball Hall of Fame in 2023.

== Career statistics ==
Legend
GP	Games played	GS	Games started	MPG	Minutes per game
FG%	Field goal percentage	3P%	3-point field goal percentage	FT%	Free throw percentage
RPG	Rebounds per game	APG	Assists per game	SPG	Steals per game
BPG	Blocks per game	PPG	Points per game	**Bold**	Career high
†	Won an NBA championship	*	Led the league

=== NBA ===
==== Regular season ====
Year	Team	GP	GS	MPG	FG%	3P%	FT%	RPG	APG	SPG	BPG	PPG
1981–82	Detroit	72	72	33.8	.424	.288	.704	2.9	7.8	2.1	.2	17.0
1982–83	Detroit	81	81	**38.2**	.472	.288	.710	4.0	7.8	**2.5**	**.4**	**22.9**
1983–84	Detroit	**82***	**82***	36.7	.462	**.338**	.733	4.0	11.1	**2.5**	**.4**	21.3
1984–85	Detroit	81	81	38.1	.458	.257	.809	**4.5**	**13.9***	2.3	.3	21.2
1985–86	Detroit	77	77	36.2	**.488**	.310	.790	3.6	10.8	2.2	.3	20.9
1986–87	Detroit	81	81	37.2	.463	.194	.768	3.9	10.0	1.9	.2	20.6
1987–88	Detroit	81	81	36.1	.463	.309	.774	3.4	8.4	1.7	.2	19.5
1988–89†	Detroit	80	76	36.6	.464	.273	**.818**	3.4	8.3	1.7	.3	18.2
1989–90†	Detroit	81	81	37.0	.438	.309	.775	3.8	9.4	1.7	.2	18.4
1990–91	Detroit	48	46	34.5	.435	.292	.782	3.3	9.3	1.6	.2	16.2
1991–92	Detroit	78	78	37.4	.446	.291	.772	3.2	7.2	1.5	.2	18.5
1992–93	Detroit	79	79	37.0	.418	.308	.737	2.9	8.5	1.6	.2	17.6
1993–94	Detroit	58	56	30.2	.417	.310	.702	2.7	6.9	1.2	.1	14.8
Career		979	971	36.3	.452	.290	.759	3.6	9.3	1.9	.3	19.2
All-Star		11	10	28.9	.571	.400	.771	2.5	8.8	2.8	.0	16.8

==== Playoffs ====
Year	Team	GP	GS	MPG	FG%	3P%	FT%	RPG	APG	SPG	BPG	PPG
1984	Detroit	5	5	39.6	.470	.333	.771	3.8	11.0	2.6	**1.2**	21.4
1985	Detroit	9	9	39.4	**.500**	.400	.758	5.2	11.2	2.1	.4	24.3
1986	Detroit	4	4	**40.8**	.451	.000	.667	**5.5**	**12.0**	2.3	.8	**26.5**
1987	Detroit	15	15	37.5	.451	.303	.755	4.5	8.7	2.6	.3	24.1
1988	Detroit	**23**	**23**	39.6	.437	.295	**.828**	4.7	8.7	**2.9**	.3	21.9
1989†	Detroit	17	17	37.2	.412	.267	.740	4.3	8.3	1.6	.2	18.2
1990†	Detroit	20	20	37.9	.463	**.471**	.794	**5.5**	8.2	2.2	.4	20.5
1991	Detroit	13	11	33.5	.403	.273	.725	4.2	8.5	1.0	.2	13.5
1992	Detroit	5	5	40.0	.338	.364	.786	5.2	7.4	1.0	.0	14.0
Career		111	109	38.0	.441	.346	.769	4.7	8.9	2.1	.3	20.4

=== College ===
College statistics
Year	Team	GP	GS	MPG	FG%	3P%	FT%	RPG	APG	SPG	BPG	PPG
1979–80	Indiana	29	29	34.0	.510	–	.722	**4.0**	5.5	2.1	**.2**	14.6
1980–81	Indiana	**34**	**34**	**35.0**	**.554**	–	**.742**	3.1	**5.8**	**2.2**	.1	**16.0**
Career		63	63	34.5	.534	–	.756	3.5	5.7	2.2	.2	15.4

== Head coaching record ==
=== NBA ===
Legend
Regular season	G	Games coached	W	Games won	L	Games lost	W–L %	Win–loss %
Playoffs	PG	Playoff games	PW	Playoff wins	PL	Playoff losses	PW–L %	Playoff win–loss %

Team	Year	G	W	L	W–L%	Finish	PG	PW	PL	PW–L%	Result
Indiana	2000–01	82	41	41	.500	4th in Central	4	1	3	.250	Lost in First round
Indiana	2001–02	82	42	40	.512	4th in Central	5	2	3	.400	Lost in First round
Indiana	2002–03	82	48	34	.585	2nd in Central	6	2	4	.333	Lost in First round
New York	2006–07	82	33	49	.402	4th in Atlantic	—	—	—	—	Missed playoffs
New York	2007–08	82	23	59	.280	5th in Atlantic	—	—	—	—	Missed playoffs
Career		410	187	223	.456		15	5	10	.333	

=== College ===
Record table
Season	Team	Overall	Conference	Standing	Postseason
FIU Golden Panthers / Panthers (Sun Belt Conference) (2009–2012)
2009–10	FIU	7–25	4–14	6th (East)	
2010–11	FIU	11–19	5–11	6th (East)	
2011–12	FIU	8–21	5–11	T–5th (East)	
FIU:		26–65	14–36		
Total:		26–65			

== See also ==
- Michigan Sports Hall of Fame
- List of National Basketball Association career assists leaders
- List of National Basketball Association career steals leaders
- List of National Basketball Association career turnovers leaders
- List of National Basketball Association career playoff assists leaders
- List of National Basketball Association career playoff steals leaders
- List of National Basketball Association career playoff turnovers leaders
- List of National Basketball Association players with most assists in a game
- List of National Basketball Association franchise career scoring leaders
