= Gordon Quinn =

American film producer

- Born: 1942 (age 83–84); Washington, DC

Gordon Quinn is artistic director and founding member of Kartemquin Films and a 2007 recipient of the MacArthur Award for Creative and Effective Institutions. Gordon Quinn has been making documentaries for over 45 years and has produced or directed over 30 films. His recent directing credits include Prisoner of Her Past and A Good Man. His producing credits include the films Hoop Dreams; In the Family;Vietnam, Long Time Coming; Golub: Late Works Are the Catastrophes; 5 Girls; Refrigerator Mothers; and Stevie. Most recently, Gordon executive produced Mapping Stem Cell Research: Terra Incognita and The New Americans, for which he directed the Palestinian segment. Currently, he is executive producing several new films for Kartemquin.

Gordon has been a long-time supporter of public media and community-based independent media groups, and served on the boards of several organizations including the National Coalition of Public Broadcast Producers, the Citizens Committee on the Media, the Chicago Access Corporation, the Illinois Humanities Council, the Public Square Advisory Committee and the Illinois Advisory Committee to the U.S. Commission on Civil Rights.

== Filmography ==
Executive Producer:

- America to Me, 2018
- Minding the Gap, 2018
- '63 Boycott, 2017
- Edith+Eddie, 2017
- Abacus: Small Enough to Jail, 2016
- Hard Earned, 2015
- The Trials of Muhammad Ali
- American Arab
- A Good Man
- The Interrupters, in 2011
- No Crossover, in 2010
- Typeface, in 2009
- At the Death House Door, in 2008
- Mapping Stem Cell Research: Terra Incognita, 2007
- The New Americans, 2004 TV episode
- 5 Girls, 2001
- Hoop Dreams, 1994

Producer:

- Prisoner of Her Past, in 2010 (with Joanna Rudnick and Howard Reich)
- In the Family, in 2008 (with Joanna Rudnick)
- Golub: Late Works Are the Catastrophes, 2004 (with Jerry Blumenthal)
- Refrigerator Mothers, 2003 (with JJ Hanley and David E. Simpson)
- Stevie, 2002
- Vietnam, Long Time Coming, 1998
- Chicago Crossings: Bridges and Boundaries, 1994
- Higher Goals, 1993
- Grassroots Chicago, 1991
- Golub, 1988
- Taylor Chain, 1985
- Women's Voices: The Gender Gap, 1984
- The Last Pullman Car, 1983
- The Chicago Maternity Center Story, 1976
- Marco, 1970 (with Gerald Temaner)
- Thumbs Down, 1968
- Home for Life, 1968

Director:

- For The Left Hand, 2021 (co-director)
- A Good Man, in 2011
- Prisoner of Her Past, in 2010
- Golub: Late Works Are the Catastrophes, 2004
- The New Americans, 2004 TV episode (Palestinian story director)
- Vietnam, Long Time Coming, 1998
- Golub, 1988
- The Last Pullman Car, 1983
- Marco, 1970
- Thumbs Down, 1968
- Home for Life, 1968
- Inquiring Nuns, 1968

Cinematographer:

- Golub: Late Works Are the Catastrophes, 2004
- The New Americans, 2004 TV episode
- Aging Out, 2004
- Refrigerator Mothers, 2003
- Stevie, 2002
- Vietnam, Long Time Coming, 1998
- Grassroots Chicago, 1991
- Golub, 1988
- Women's Voices: The Gender Gap, 1984
- Taylor Chain II: A Story of Collective Bargaining, 1984
- Anarchism in America, 1983
- The Last Pullman Car, 1983
- All of Us Stronger, 1976
- Hum 255, 1969
- Thumbs Down, 1968
- Home for Life, 1968
- Inquiring Nuns, 1968

Editor:

- Marco, 1970
- Home for Life, 1968
- Inquiring Nuns, 1968
- Thumbs Down, 1968
- Eat the Document, 1967, 1972

Writer:

- The Last Pullman Car, 1983

== Awards ==
- Excellence in Documentary Cinematography at the Sundance Film Festival for Stevie, 2003
