= Usama Alshaibi =

American film director

- Usama Alshaibi in Chicago.
- Born: November 20, 1969 (age 56); Baghdad, Iraq
- Education: Columbia College Chicago, University of Colorado Boulder

Usama Alshaibi (Arabic: أسامة الشيبي) (born in Baghdad, Iraq on November 20, 1969) is an Iraqi-American independent filmmaker and visual artist.

== Life and career ==
Alshaibi's mother was born in Jaffa, Palestine and met his Iraqi father in Baghdad. Usama was their first child. During his formative years, Alshaibi grew up between the Middle East and the United States. He was a child during the Iran-Iraq War and has stated that he suffered from post-traumatic stress disorder as a result of the nightly bombings when his family lived in Basra, Iraq. When Alshaibi was twenty years old, the Iraqi government under Saddam Hussein, conscripted him into the Iraqi army at the start of the Gulf War. Fearing for his life, he was granted political asylum to remain in the United States. Throughout his teenage years and into his 20's, he focused on art and painting. Later, he discovered filmmaking, which became his lifelong passion.

In early 2004, nine months after the United States invasion of Iraq, Alshaibi traveled back to Baghdad with his father to shoot his first documentary film, titled Nice Bombs. Funded in part by Creative Capital and the Playboy Foundation, the documentary was produced by Kristie Alshaibi and executive produced by Studs Terkel. The world premiere for the film was at the 2006 Chicago Underground Film Festival, where it won the award for Best Documentary Feature. Studs Terkel and Christie Hefner introduced the screening. Nice Bombs had a theatrical release in 2007 and a broadcast premiere on the Sundance Channel in March 2008 and was released on DVD in October 2009.

His second feature documentary film American Arab, was produced by the Chicago non-profit production company Kartemquin Films with Executive Producer Gordon Quinn.

Alshaibi is the director of several narrative feature-length films, Profane, Muhammad and Jane, Soak, and more than fifty short films. He has also produced and directed numerous music videos for a variety of musicians, including Mahjongg, Silver Jews, Panicsville and Bobby Conn. Alshaibi was the founder and Director of the Z Film Festival (2000–2005) and his short films have toured with author Jack Sargeant's underground film programs.

Usama Alshaibi is interviewed in fellow Chicagoan Studs Terkel's book Hope Dies Last. He is the elder brother of artist Sama Alshaibi and sociologist Wisam Alshaibi.

== Filmography ==
=== Feature films ===
- This Has Already Happened (2025)
- American Arab (2013)
- Profane (2011)
- Nice Bombs (2006)
- Muhammad and Jane (2003)
- Soak (2002)

=== Select Short films ===
- Trip Ziggurat (2025)
- Testimony (2023)
- Soon (2022)
- In the Dirt (2020)
- Here (2020)
- The Desire (2020)
- The Muslim Meme (2017)
- The Flowering (2017)
- Baghdad, Iowa (2015)
- My Third Painting (2009)
- My Mother Paused by My Father (2009)
- Signal Cross Over (2007)
- Dream of Samarra (2007)
- Convulsion Expulsion (2004)
- The Amateurs (2003)
- Allahu Akbar (2003)
- The Foreigner (2001)
- Dogirl (2000)
- Dance Habibi Dance (1999)

=== Select Music videos ===
- Tell The Police The Truth by Mahjongg (2008)
- King for a Day by Bobby Conn (2007)
- Hold My Scissors by Magic is Küntmaster (2004)
- Stabbed in the Face by Panicsville (2003)
- Angels by Bobby Conn (2002)
- Random Rules by Silver Jews (1998)

== Accolades and Awards ==
- 2011 John D. and Catherine T. MacArthur Foundation Award for American Arab
- 2011 Playboy Foundation Grant for American Arab
- 2011 Kartemquin Films Diversity Fellowship for American Arab
- 2011 Underground Film Journal, Movie Of The Year Profane
- 2011 Minneapolis Underground Film Festival, Best Experimental Film Profane
- 2011 Boston Underground Film Festival, Best of Fest for Profane
- 2010 Sexy International Film Festival, Best International Feature Film, Best Director & Best Cinematography for Profane
- 2007 Westchester Film Festival, Best Documentary Film for Nice Bombs
- 2006 Chicago Underground Film Festival, Best Documentary Film for Nice Bombs
- 2005 Creative Capital Film Grant for Nice Bombs
- 2004 Chicago Underground Film Festival, Made in Chicago Award for Bombshell

== See also ==
- Underground film
- Iraqi art
- List of Iraqi artists
