= Peter Gilbert (filmmaker) =

American documentary filmmaker

Peter Gilbert (born 1957 or 1958) is an American documentary filmmaker, film producer, and cinematographer. He was the cinematographer and one of the producers of Hoop Dreams, a 1994 documentary about two teenage basketball players in Chicago. He has worked on several films for Kartemquin Films, including Vietnam, Long Time Coming, At the Death House Door (which he co-directed with Steve James), and In the Game. He was nominated for a Primetime Emmy for Exceptional Merit In Nonfiction Filmmaking in 2005 for producing With All Deliberate Speed, a documentary about Brown v. Board of Education. Prior to Hoop Dreams, he worked on the cinematography of American Dream by Barbara Kopple, and with Haskell Wexler. He is a member of the Academy of Motion Picture Arts and Sciences.

As of 2018, he lives in Chicago, where he grew up.

== Filmography ==
Peter Gilbert filmography
Title	Year	Role
Hoop Dreams	1994	Cinematographer, co-producer
Vietnam, Long Time Coming	1998	Co-director, co-producer
Stevie	2002	Cinematographer
With All Deliberate Speed	2004	Director, producer
At the Death House Door	2008	Co-director, co-producer
Sacred Transformations	2010	Cinematographer
In the Game	2015	Cinematographer
Cooked: Survival by Zip Code	2018	Additional camera
