= The Chicago Maternity Center Story =

- Directed by: Gordon Quinn; Jerry Blumenthal
- Produced by: Gordon Quinn; Jerry Blumenthal
- Release date: 1976
- Running time: 60 minutes
- Country: United States
- Language: English

The Chicago Maternity Center Story is a 1976 feature-length documentary film produced by Kartemquin Films. It tells the story of The Chicago Maternity Center as it fights to stay open despite declining funding. The center had been open for 75 years, but was forced to close in light of modern medicine's changing attitude toward home birth and subsequent lack of resources.

The film is structured in two parts. It first follows the story of Scharene Miller, who was one of the last mothers to use the Maternity Center's home birthing services. The backdrop to this personal story is provided in the broader context of the rise of corporate medicine and the current barriers for the poor in accessing quality medical care. The work of the Center's director, Beatrice Tucker, and other staff are highlighted throughout, as are the demonstrations that attempted to keep the work going.
