= Milking the Rhino =

- Directed by: David E. Simpson
- Produced by: David E. Simpson; Gordon Quinn; Jeannie R. Magill (co-producer)
- Cinematography: Jason Longo
- Edited by: David E. Simpson
- Music by: Joel Diamond
- Distributed by: Kartemquin Films
- Release date: February 16, 2009
- Running time: 83 minutes
- Country: United States
- Languages: English; Maasai; Swahili; Ojihimba

Milking the Rhino is a 2009 documentary film, produced by Kartemquin Films, that examines the relationship between the indigenous African wildlife, the villagers who live amongst this wildlife, and conservationists who look to keep tourism dollars coming in. Both the Maasai of Kenya and the Ovahimba of Namibia have spent centuries as cattle farmers. With their land being turned into protected game reserves, these ancient tribes have turned to tourism as a means of survival.

While some environmentalists think that community-based conservation is ideal for these villagers, the dangers of drought and the starvation of their cattle remain a constant reality. Stuck between the always-growing Western influence that wants Africa to remain a place for sightseeing safaris and their own ancient cultures, the Maasai and Himba are at a crossroads of cultural change.

The Kenyan section of the movie features interviews with Kinanjui Lesenderia, an Ndorobo Maasai elder at Il Ngwesi in Kenya, Ian Craig, former rancher and founder of the Lewa Wildlife Conservancy, James Ole Kinyaga, Senior Host of Kenya's first community-owned and managed eco-lodge, and Helen Gichohi, President of the African Wildlife Foundation.

== Awards ==
Produced by Kartemquin Films and directed by David E. Simpson, Milking the Rhino won numerous awards at multiple international film festivals, including Best Documentary at the Pan African Film Festival and San Luis Obispo International Film Festival.

On April 7, 2009, Milking the Rhino made its television premiere on PBS's Independent Lens.

The film won Best Cinematography at the United Nations Association Film Festival.

In 2010, Milking the Rhino won the Audience Award (Best Documentary) at the Kansas City International Film Festival.
