= Helen Gichohi =

Kenyan environmentalist

Helen Wanjiru Gichohi
- Education: University of Nairobi
- Occupation: Ecologist
- Known for: President of the African Wildlife Foundation

Helen Wanjiru Gichohi is a Kenyan ecologist who was President of the African Wildlife Foundation (AWF) from 2007 to 2013.

== Education ==
Helen Gichohi was born into an agricultural community in central Kenya. She earned a Bachelor of Science degree in zoology from Kenyatta University and a Master of Science degree in biology of Conservation from University of Nairobi. She went on to the University of Leicester, where she gained a PhD degree in ecology. While working for her PhD, Helen studied the effect of controlled burning on wildlife grazing areas in the Nairobi National Park. Her conclusion was that, properly managed, fire could be helpful in maintaining an open savannah that provides food for wildlife. She has said that she drifted into ecology, partly because she much preferred to work outdoors than inside in a laboratory.

== Career ==
In 1990, while a researcher at Wildlife Conservation International (WCI), Helen Gichohi prepared an environmental impact statement on a commercial Export Processing Zone for the Kenyan government. She became Director of the African Conservation Centre (ACC), supported by Wildlife Conservation Society. In 1998 she was appointed to a five-person panel to advise US President Bill Clinton about environmental issues in Africa. She joined the African Wildlife Foundation in February 2001 as Director of the African Heartlands Program and in February 2002 she was appointed program vice-president. In January 2006 the President of Kenya awarded Dr. Gichohi the Order of Great Warrior of Kenya Award in recognition of her contribution to conservation.

In January 2007 the board of trustees elected her as President of the AWF. She also serves on the board of trustees of the Kenya Wildlife Service. Helen Gichohi features as an expert speaker in the award-winning 2009 movie Milking the Rhino. As of 2011 she was a member of the Local Advisory Committee in Kenya of the Global Give Back Circle. She was a member of board of trustees of the Kenya Land Conservation Trust and of Beads for Education, a non-profit organisation that helps mothers earn money to send their daughters to school. She was a board member of the Equity Bank Kenya, which started as a building society, later becoming a microfinance institution and then a full-fledged commercial bank.

== Bibliography ==
- Helen Wanjiru Gichohi (1996). The ecology of a truncated ecosystem: the Athi-Kapiti Plains. University of Leicester.
- Edmund G. C. Barrow; Helen Gichohi; Mark Infield (2000). Rhetoric or reality?: a review of community conservation policy and practice in East Africa. International Institute for Environment and Development. p. 184.
- Jeffrey Worden; Robin Spencer Reid; Helen Gichohi (2003). Land-use impacts on large wildlife and livestock in the swamps of the greater Amboseli ecosystem, Kajiado District, Kenya. LUCID Project, International Livestock Research Institute. p. 100.
