= On Beauty (film) =

- Directed by: Joanna Rudnick
- Produced by: Joanna Rudnick
- Edited by: Liz Kaar
- Production company: Kartemquin Films
- Distributed by: Women Make Movies
- Release date: October 13, 2014 (Hot Springs)
- Running time: 31 minutes
- Country: United States
- Language: English

On Beauty is a 2014 short documentary film, produced by Kartemquin Films. It follows the story of Rick Guidotti, a fashion photographer who in 1998 decided to quit the fashion industry to found a nonprofit based on promoting diversity and acceptance.

On Beauty premiered at the Hot Springs Documentary Film Festival and won awards at a number of film festivals including the Chicago International Film Festival and the Cleveland International Film Festival. It was funded in part by the Sage Foundation and the Illinois Humanities Council.

The film was directed by Joanna Rudnick, the Emmy-nominated director of In the Family.

== Synopsis ==
On Beauty follows the story of Rick Guidotti. Guidotti left a 15-year career in fashion when he became frustrated with restrictive standards of beauty. He formed the non-profit Positive Exposure, which uses photographs and video to change public perceptions of people with genetic, physical, behavioral and intellectual differences. On Beauty follows Rick with two of his subjects: Sarah, who was bullied for her Sturge-Weber birthmark, and Janey, a girl with albinism living in East Africa.
