= Thomas Lee Wright =

American screenwriter

- Born: December 6, 1953 (age 72); Moscow, Idaho
- Occupations: Author, director, screenwriter, producer
- Years active: 1993–present

Thomas Lee Wright is an American author, screenwriter and Academy Award-nominated filmmaker. A Minnesota native, Wright attended Harvard University, writing and directing plays and earning a degree in English Literature with honors. He studied Irish Theater at Trinity College, Dublin, and played point guard for its national championship basketball team.

Moving to Los Angeles, Wright became a story editor at The Walt Disney Company and Columbia Pictures, then worked as a creative executive at Paramount where he helped develop 48 Hrs., Trading Places, and Flashdance. His first screenwriting assignment was writing a draft of The Godfather Part III. This led to authoring projects for Peter Guber, Dino De Laurentiis, Mike Medavoy, and Daniel Melnick, among others. Wright wrote the original screenplay for the Warner Brothers film New Jack City. which the New York Times called "an urban classic" on the 25th anniversary of its premiere. He was nominated for Best Documentary Short Subject at the 90th Academy Awards for Edith+Eddie.

Wright is well known for his films about social justice issues, including:

- Edith+Eddie; (producer) which won the IDA (International Documentary Association) Best Short award in 2017, along with Emmy and Oscar nominations.
- Eight-Tray Gangster (director) for the Discovery Channel about the 1992 Los Angeles riots from a gang member's perspective.
- Trade Off (producer) about the 1999 Seattle WTO protests for Human Rights Watch.

Three of his films deal with war veterans:

- The Long Ride Home (director)
- To Them That's Gone (executive producer)
- Last Flag Flying (executive producer) Wright developed this as a feature film for director Richard Linklater.

As an author, Wright co-wrote two books about filmmaking:

- Working in Hollywood traces the making of a motion picture through tasks performed by 64 different workers behind the scenes
- American Screenwriters is a collection of interviews with top writers discussing the craft and business of screenwriting.

== Filmography ==
- 2026: "Mouth of the Wolf: Amanda Knox Returns to Italy" (Documentary)(producer)
- 2017: Last Flag Flying (executive producer)
- 2017: Edith+Eddie (Documentary short) (producer)
- 2016: Big Sonia (Documentary) (executive producer)
- 2015: In Utero (Documentary) (executive producer)
- 2013: Finding Hillywood (Documentary) (executive producer)
- 2013: The Long Ride Home (Documentary) (director, producer)
- 2012: To Them That's Gone (Documentary) (executive producer)
- 2007: Battle in Seattle (co-executive producer)
- 2000: Trade Off (Documentary) (writer, producer)
- 1993: Eight-Tray Gangster: The Making of a Crip (Documentary) (director, producer)
- 1991: New Jack City (screenplay) / (story)
- 1990: The Last of the Finest (screenplay)
