= Profane =

Profane may refer to:

- Profane (religion), a lack of respect for things that are held to be sacred
- Profanity, the usage of notionally offensive words for a variety of purposes
- Profane (film), a 2011 American independent film
- Profanity (instant messaging client), an instant messaging TUI client that supports XMPP
