= Raising Bertie =

- Directed by: Margaret Byrne
- Produced by: Ian Robertson Kibbe; Margaret Byrne; Jon Stuyvesant
- Cinematography: Jon Stuyvesant
- Edited by: Leslie Simmer
- Music by: Eric Andrew Kuhn
- Production companies: Beti Films; Kartemquin Films
- Distributed by: Kartemquin Films
- Release date: April 9, 2016 (Full Frame)
- Running time: 96 minutes
- Country: United States
- Language: English

Raising Bertie is a 2016 American documentary film directed by Margaret Byrne and produced by Ian Robertson Kibbe, Margaret Byrne, and Jon Stuyvesant. It was distributed by Kartemquin Films and aired in shortened form on the 30th season of PBS's documentary series POV on August 28, 2017.

North Carolina native and Grammy-nominated rapper J. Cole is one of the executive producers of the film.

== Release and awards ==
Raising Bertie premiered at Full Frame Documentary Film Festival in 2016, and subsequently screened at 25 more festivals. The film won multiple awards including the Documentary Feature Special Jury Award at the Atlanta Film Festival, Best Director at the Atlanta Underground Film Festival, Best Documentary Feature at Atlanta Docufest, and Best First Time Director at the Downtown Film Festival Los Angeles.

== Critical reception ==
Critically, the film has been well received. Kimber Myers of the Los Angeles Times called the film an "impressive directorial debut ... alternates between triumph and tragedy, but there's never a moment that doesn't feel intimate and authentic." In IndieWire, Bryn Gelbart called the film "astounding and powerful." Alan Scherstuhl from The Village Voice called the film "essential ... Charts nothing less than what it's like to try to grow up free in the prison capital of the world," and Scott Pfeiffer of The Moving World said the film "deserves a place beside the great achievements in longitudinal film."

Miriam Di Nunzio of the Chicago Sun-Times said the film "powerfully drives home what is obvious and yet what most of us fail to see: Bertie County is America. It's Chicago. It's Detroit. It's Los Angeles. It's a portrait of communities and families striving to do right by their kids, but where schools and lack of job programs fail to meet communities' most desperate needs." Brian Tallerico of RogerEbert.com said "I never would have heard of Bertie, North Carolina if it weren't for this movie, and using art to learn about every corner of our country seems more essential than ever."

Sheri Linden of The Hollywood Reporter said "the experiences and challenges of the rural poor might make it into the national conversation as an abstraction, but rarely with the specificity of this intimate portrait of a black community." Brian C. Bush of The Huffington Post called the film "starkly poetic" and said it "brilliantly weaves the young men's stories together, as they transition from their teens into manhood, engaged in a shared struggle for social and economic survival."

Executive Producer Gordon Quinn said of the film, "Raising Bertie challenges us to see the value in lives too often ignored, those of rural America and emerging adults."
