= Any Given Day (film) =

2021 American documentary film

- Directed by: Margaret Byrne
- Produced by: Margaret Byrne
- Cinematography: Margaret Byrne
- Edited by: Liz Kaar
- Music by: Eric Kuhn
- Production companies: Beti Films; Independent Television Service
- Release date: April 29, 2021 (Hot Docs)
- Running time: 93 minutes
- Country: United States
- Language: English

Any Given Day is a 2021 American documentary film directed, produced, and photographed by Margaret Byrne. Filmed over five years in Chicago, the film follows Angela, Dimitar, and Daniel, three participants in a Cook County mental health court probation program, as they navigate mental illness, housing, employment, family relationships, and life after incarceration. As production continues, Byrne also becomes a participant in the documentary, incorporating her own experiences into the film.

The film had its world premiere at the 2021 Hot Docs Canadian International Documentary Festival, where Byrne received an honorable mention in the Emerging International Filmmaker category. It later received the Chicago Award at the Chicago International Film Festival and the Grand Jury Prize for Documentary Feature at the Mystic Film Festival. Any Given Day aired nationally in 2022 as part of the public television series America ReFramed.

== Synopsis ==
Any Given Day follows Angela, Dimitar, and Daniel, three formerly incarcerated Chicagoans participating in a specialized Cook County mental health court probation program. Over several years, the film documents their efforts to find stability in their families, friendships, employment, housing, and mental health treatment.

Angela, a mother of four, works to regain custody of her youngest child. Daniel, who had studied fashion design, works toward greater independence and stable housing. Dimitar, an author and anthropologist, attempts to manage his mental health while seeking employment and independence.

As the film develops, Byrne's relationship to the story changes. Initially present primarily as the filmmaker behind the camera, she eventually incorporates her own experiences into the documentary, making herself a fourth participant in the film.

== Production ==
Byrne began filming in 2015 while investigating the treatment of detainees with mental illness at the Cook County Jail. During that work she met Angela, Dimitar, and Daniel, participants in the Cook County Mental Health Court probation program, and continued filming with them over five years.

Byrne did not initially intend to appear as a subject in the documentary. She had a limited presence in the early edit, primarily through conversations heard from behind the camera. During post-production, editor Liz Kaar encouraged Byrne to incorporate more of her own experience into the film, which changed the documentary's structure.

The production used a long-term observational approach. Byrne filmed largely on her own during the first years of production and developed ongoing relationships with Angela, Daniel, Dimitar, and their families.

Near the completion of the film, Byrne screened the cut for Angela, Daniel, and Dimitar. The participants discussed scenes and moments they found uncomfortable, and all three ultimately signed off on the completed film. Before the film's first in-person festival screening in Chicago, the production also hired a film therapist who met individually and collectively with the participants and filmmakers.

Byrne served as director, producer, and cinematographer. Liz Kaar edited the film, Eric Kuhn composed the music, and Rory McFadden served as associate editor. Latesha Dickerson was associate producer and impact producer. Executive producers were Sally Jo Fifer, Leslie Norville, and Jane Wells. The film was a co-production of Beti Films and the Independent Television Service (ITVS).

== Release ==
Any Given Day had its world premiere at the 2021 Hot Docs Canadian International Documentary Festival, where it screened in the International Spectrum competition. The Hot Docs jury gave Byrne an honorable mention in the Emerging International Filmmaker category.

The film had its first in-person festival screenings at the Chicago International Film Festival in October 2021. It later screened at festivals including the Mystic Film Festival, Big Sky Documentary Film Festival, and ReelAbilities Film Festival.

On July 7, 2022, Any Given Day received its national public television broadcast premiere as Season 10, Episode 7 of America ReFramed on WORLD Channel and PBS stations.

The film was subsequently distributed to educational institutions by Cinema Guild.

== Reception ==
Writing for POV Magazine following the film's Hot Docs premiere, Pat Mullen praised Byrne's long-term observational approach and the film's treatment of its participants, describing Any Given Day as a "deeply empathetic documentary." Mullen later selected Any Given Day as his best film of the 2021 Hot Docs festival in a survey published by the Toronto Film Critics Association.

In a preview of the 2021 Chicago International Film Festival, Peter Sobczynski of RogerEbert.com called Any Given Day a moving documentary and wrote that it effectively exposes gaps in the social safety net while also recognizing the participants' personal victories.

Nancy Bishop of Third Coast Review wrote that the film brings mental illness "out of the shadows" and emphasized its portrayal of the continuing struggles experienced by Angela, Daniel, and Dimitar.

Kent Turner of Film-Forward focused on the relationship developed between Byrne and the participants, describing the film as a testament to the trust that can develop between documentary filmmakers and the people they film. He also noted the film's depiction of the connection between mental health and substance use.

In August 2022, the Chicago Reader published a feature about the film and its approach to mental health. Sheri Flanders discussed the film's depiction of Angela, Daniel, and Dimitar, Byrne's decision to include herself in the documentary, and its focus on relationships and community support.

The International Documentary Association later selected Byrne as its July 2022 "Doc Star of the Month" in a feature focused on Any Given Day, its production process, and Byrne's decision to become a participant in the documentary.

== Awards and recognition ==
Year	Organization	Recognition	Result
2021	Hot Docs Canadian International Documentary Festival	Emerging International Filmmaker	Honorable mention
2021	Chicago International Film Festival	Chicago Award	Won
2021	Mystic Film Festival	Grand Jury Prize – Documentary Feature	Won
