= DeLee =

DeLee is a surname. Notable people with the surname include:

- Debra DeLee (born 1948), chair of the U.S. Democratic National Committee
- Joseph DeLee (1869–1942), American physician and obstetrician

== See also ==
- Lee (disambiguation)
