= Margaret Byrne (filmmaker) =

American documentary filmmaker, producer

- Occupations: Filmmaker, Producer, and cinematographer

Margaret Byrne is an American documentary filmmaker, producer, and cinematographer. She directed the feature documentaries Raising Bertie (2016) and Any Given Day (2021). Raising Bertie aired nationally on PBS's POV. Any Given Day premiered at the 2021 Hot Docs Canadian International Documentary Festival, where Byrne received an honorable mention in the Emerging International Filmmaker category. The film later received the Chicago Award at the Chicago International Film Festival and aired nationally on America ReFramed in 2022.

== Career ==
Byrne began filming in Bertie County, North Carolina, in 2009, initially intending to make a documentary about an alternative school in the county. After the school closed, she continued filming three of its students over six years. The project became Raising Bertie.

Raising Bertie was Byrne's feature directorial debut. The documentary follows three young men coming of age in rural Bertie County using a cinéma vérité approach. The film premiered at the 2016 Full Frame Documentary Film Festival and later aired as an episode of PBS's POV on August 28, 2017. Byrne and producer Ian Robertson Kibbe discussed the six-year production of the film on PBS News Hour following its PBS premiere.

Byrne's second feature documentary, Any Given Day, was filmed over five years and follows three people she met while examining the treatment of people with mental illness in Chicago's Cook County criminal legal system. Byrne also became a participant in the film, incorporating her own experiences into the documentary. The film premiered at the 2021 Hot Docs Canadian International Documentary Festival. In the Emerging International Filmmaker category, the Hot Docs jury gave Byrne an honorable mention for Any Given Day.

Later in 2021, the Chicago International Film Festival presented Byrne with its Chicago Award for Any Given Day, recognizing an outstanding film in the festival's City & State program. The film subsequently aired as Season 10, Episode 7 of America ReFramed on July 7, 2022. That same month, the International Documentary Association selected Byrne as its "Doc Star of the Month" in a feature about the film and her filmmaking process.

In addition to directing her own films, Byrne has worked as a documentary cinematographer. Her credits include American Promise (2013), All the Queen's Horses (2017), Generation Wealth (2018), Waging Change (2019), Surge (2020), and The Big Payback (2022). She is the founder of Beti Films.

== Filmography ==
=== Director ===
- Raising Bertie (2016)
- Any Given Day (2021)

=== Selected cinematography ===
- American Promise (2013)
- All the Queen's Horses (2017)
- Generation Wealth (2018)
- Waging Change (2019)
- Surge (2020)
- The Big Payback (2022)
