= Carlos Hernández =

Carlos Hernández or Hernandez may refer to:

== Sports ==
=== American football ===
- Carlos Hernandez (American football) (born 2005), American football player

=== Association football ===
- Carlos Hernández (footballer, born 1982), Costa Rican footballer
- Carlos Hernández (footballer, born 1990), Spanish footballer
- Carlos Hernández (footballer, born 1996), Colombian footballer

=== Baseball ===
- Carlos Hernández (catcher) (born 1967), Venezuelan baseball catcher
- Carlos Hernández (infielder) (born 1975), Venezuelan baseball infielder
- Carlos Hernández (pitcher, born 1980), Venezuelan baseball pitcher
- Carlos Hernández (pitcher, born 1997), Venezuelan baseball pitcher

=== Boxing ===
- Carlos Hernández (boxer) (born 1971), Salvadoran American boxer
- Carlos Hernández (Venezuelan boxer) (1940–2016), Venezuelan boxer

=== Cycling ===
- Carlos Hernández Bailo (born 1958), Spanish racing cyclist

=== Weightlifting ===
- Carlos Hernández (weightlifter, born 1972), Carlos Alexis Hernández, Cuban weightlifter
- Carlos Hernández (weightlifter, born 1983), Cuban weightlifter

== Other ==
- Carlos Hernández (politician) (born 1961), Cuban-born American politician
- Charlie Hernández (born 1965), Puerto Rican politician
- Carlos Hernández Vázquez (born 1983), Mexican filmmaker
- Carlos Hernández (criminal) (1954–1999), American criminal accused of murder
- Carlos Hernandez (writer) (born 1971), American author of science-fiction and fantasy
