= Refrigerator Mothers =

2003 American television documentary

- Directed by: David E. Simpson
- Country of origin: United States
- Original language: English

Production
- Producers: David E. Simpson, J.J. Hanley & Gordon Quinn
- Running time: 60 minutes

Original release
- Release: 2003

Refrigerator Mothers is a 2003 American television documentary film by Kartemquin Films for PBS's P.O.V. series. The film paints an intimate portrait of an entire generation of American mothers whose children were diagnosed with autism. Labeled "refrigerator mothers" in the 1950s and 1960s by the medical establishment for their supposedly frigid and detached mothering, these women "have emerged with strong, resilient voices to share the details of their personal journeys".

Refrigerator Mothers was awarded First Prize at the 2002 National Council of Family Relations Media Awards. The film won Best of Show at the 2002 Indiana Film Festival as well as named as an Official Selection to numerous international film festivals.

Refrigerator Mothers was featured in a January 2010 issue of Psychology Today that focused on the racial and class stereotyping of autism.
