= Vietnam, Long Time Coming =

- Directed by: Jerry Blumenthal; Peter Gilbert; Gordon Quinn
- Produced by: Jerry Blumenthal; Peter Gilbert; Gordon Quinn
- Narrated by: Joe Mantegna
- Edited by: David E. Simpson; Jan Sutcliffe; Sharon Karp; Bob Schneiger
- Music by: Ben Sidran
- Production company: Kartemquin Films
- Distributed by: Seventh Art Releasing
- Release date: 1998
- Running time: 120 min
- Country: United States
- Language: English

Vietnam, Long Time Coming is a 1998 documentary directed by Jerry Blumenthal, Peter Gilbert, and Gordon Quinn and distributed by Kartemquin Films. The film follows a 16-day, 1100 mile bicycle expedition through once war-torn Northern and Southern Vietnam that was organized by World T.E.A.M. Sports. The event drew an array of veterans from the U.S. and Vietnam, as well as celebrity riders like Greg LeMond and Senator John Kerry. Those without use of their legs used special hand-powered bikes, while blind riders pedaled from the back of tandem bikes. Past enemies ride as one team in peace across a landscape they once killed to stay alive on.

Winner of Outstanding Directorial Achievement at the 1998 Directors Guild Awards, as well as Outstanding Program Achievement at the 1998 Emmy Awards, Vietnam, Long Time Coming won multiple national awards. The film's soundtrack featured such artists as Bruce Springsteen, Emmylou Harris, and Shawn Colvin. A portion of the proceeds went to groups promoting medical and educational programs in Vietnam.
