= Taylor Chain =

Taylor Chain I & II & III
- Directed by: Jerry Blumenthal; Gordon Quinn
- Written by: Gordon Quinn
- Produced by: Vicki Cooper; Richard Schmiechen; Jenny Rohrer
- Cinematography: Gordon Quinn
- Edited by: Jerry Blumenthal
- Distributed by: Kartemquin Films
- Running time: 64 minutes
- Country: United States
- Language: English
- Budget: 454,000

Taylor Chain I & II are a pair of documentary films, produced by Kartemquin FIlms, that first examine a seven-week workers' strike at a Hammond, Indiana, chain manufacturing plant and then follow the collective bargaining process of the same plant one decade later. Originally released by Kartemquin as two separate short documentaries in 1980 and 1984, Taylor Chain I & II were released together to show how the decade-long labor movement was affected by the recession and anti-union legislation of the early 1980s.

Taylor Chain I: The Story in a Union Local begins in the 1970s, as workers at the Taylor Chain manufacturing plant begin negotiations with management for a new contract. Cameras go from the factory floor into the union hall, as workers both young and old argue about stipulations within proposed contracts. The negotiations lead to a seven-week strike, as the union takes to the picket line. Eventually, both sides make concessions and the workers return to work.

Taylor Chain II: The Story of Collective Bargaining begins ten years later, in the early 1980s, as both workers and management are attempting to save the plant as recession and globalization have reduced the factory's workforce drastically. The union and management sit across from one another in a Holiday Inn conference room, trying to come to a compromise that will both save the plant as well as take care of the workforce. In the end, the two sides come to an agreement, but it is not enough to save Taylor Chain from closure.

Directed by Jerry Blumenthal and Gordon Quinn, Taylor Chain I was the winner of the 1980 William Friedkin Award at the Chicago International Film Festival. Also directed by Blumenthal and Quinn, Taylor Chain II won the First Award at the 1985 International Labor Communications Association Film & Broadcast Competition. Broadcast on public television, Taylor Chain I & II have been praised for their realistic glimpse into the lives of blue-collar workers.
