= A Good Man (2011 film) =

- Directed by: Gordon Quinn; Bob Hercules
- Produced by: Joanna Rudnick
- Cinematography: Keith Walker
- Edited by: David E. Simpson
- Release date: April 17, 2011 (Full Frame Documentary Film Festival)
- Country: United States
- Language: English

A Good Man is a 2011 documentary film about Tony Award-winning dance choreographer, Bill T. Jones, and his efforts to create the dance-theatre piece, "Fondly Do We Hope...Fervently Do We Pray", a salute to Abraham Lincoln for Chicago's Ravinia Festival. A Good Man details Jones's personal struggles with race and coming to grips with the legacy of the Lincoln Presidency and the American Civil War. From the initial pre-production to the show's final performance, the documentary follows Jones as he attempts to connect with his dancers and convey the spirit of the civil rights movement that has inspired him as an artist.

A Good Man was a co-production of American Masters, ITVS, Kartemquin Films, Media Process Group, The Ravinia Festival and was produced by Joanna Rudnick and directed by Gordon Quinn and Bob Herucles. The documentary aired on PBS's American Masters series in 2011.
