= Carroll Pickett =

Presbyterian minister (1933–2022)

- Born: 1933; Nursery, Texas, U.S.
- Died: April 3, 2022 (aged 88)
- Other names: Bud
- Education: Ordained minister
- Alma mater: Victoria College; Austin College
- Occupation: Minister
- Employer: Texas Department of Corrections (ret.)
- Known for: Prison ministry, opposition to capital punishment
- Title: Reverend
- Spouses: Sonja Campbell Pocket; Jane Pickett (m. 1990)
- Children: 4

Carroll L. "Bud" Pickett (1933 – April 3, 2022) was a Presbyterian minister in Huntsville, Texas. In the 1960s and 1970s, Pickett served as pastor for three churches in Texas. In 1980 he began serving as a chaplain in the Huntsville, Texas, prison, where he spent most of the next 15 years working with prisoners facing imminent execution. After retiring from the Texas Department of Corrections, Pickett wrote and spoke against the death penalty. His 2002 book, Within These Walls: Memoirs of a Death House Chaplain, won several awards. The 2008 documentary At the Death House Door: No Man Should Die Alone chronicles his prison ministry.

== Early life and ministry ==
Born in Nursery, Texas, Pickett attended Pattie Welder High School in Victoria and graduated from Victoria College, then Austin College in 1954 and seminary in 1957. He married Sonja Campbell of Victoria and raised 4 children. After divorcing, he married his second wife Jane in 1990.

Early in his career, he served a Presbyterian church in Sinton. From 1961 to 1967, he served as Associate Pastor for First Presbyterian Church in Victoria. From 1967 to 1980, he served as pastor of First Presbyterian Church in Huntsville, Texas.

== Attitudes towards the death penalty ==
In 1974, the Carrasco Prison Siege took the lives of two of Pickett's parishioners. After this, he was in favor of the death penalty. This was in direct conflict with the Presbyterian Church's established opposition to the death penalty.

During his tenure as a prison chaplain in the 1980s and 1990s, his views changed. In 1989 he sought psychiatric help to deal with work-related issues. He came to believe that one prisoner, Carlos DeLuna, was wrongly executed. He could not reveal his changed attitudes without jeopardizing his job and he felt a calling to continue to minister to prisoners on the last day of their lives. On the day of his retirement in 1995, he announced that he was against the death penalty. In 2008, he called execution "Biblically wrong."

In a September 2008 interview, he mentioned that his attitude change was a long process, and was in part due to the execution of several men who he believed were innocent.

In all, Pickett "walked with 95 inmates the last 10 steps to the Death House Door" in his 15 years with the prison system.

== Campaign against the death penalty ==
In addition to writing a book and being the subject of a documentary about his time as the Death House chaplain, Pickett spoke and wrote against the death penalty.

== Recognition ==
- 2002, Within These Walls: Memoirs of a Death House Chaplain, Violet Crown Award
- 2005, Within These Walls: Memoirs of a Death House Chaplain, PEN Southwest Book Awards, finalist, non-fiction

== Publications ==
- Stowers, Carlton, and Carroll Pickett, Within These Walls: Memoirs of a Death House Chaplain, ISBN 978-0-312-28717-7, St. Martin's Press, 2002, Google Books

== See also ==
- Wiktionary's entry for death house.
- Wrongful execution
