= Typeface (film) =

- Directed by: Justine Nagan
- Produced by: Gordon Quinn; Maria Finitzo
- Cinematography: Tom Bailey
- Edited by: Liz Kaar
- Distributed by: Kartemquin Films
- Release date: 2009
- Running time: 63 minutes
- Country: United States
- Language: English

Typeface is an independent documentary film, produced by Kartemquin Films and directed by Justine Nagan, about visual culture, technology and graphic design, centered on the Hamilton Wood Type and Printing Museum in Two Rivers, Wisconsin.

== Synopsis ==
The film focuses on a rural Midwestern museum and print shop where international artists meet retired craftsmen and together navigate the convergence of modern design and traditional wood type printing technique. Directed by Justine Nagan, it was released in 2009 after two sold-out sneak previews at the Walker Art Center in Minneapolis, MN.

== Release ==
Its international premiere was at the Breda International Film Festival in The Netherlands. Since that time, the film has toured around the world for screenings in select theatres, museums, universities and film festivals, including the Yerba Buena Center for the Arts in San Francisco, The Alamo Drafthouse Cinema in Austin, a sold-out week run at the Gene Siskel Film Center in Chicago, and the Denver Art Museum in Denver. Musician Josh Ritter provided the film's soundtrack. Typeface won “Best Documentary” at the Flyway Film Festival in October 2009. The film was a 2010 Regional Emmy (Chicago/Midwest Chapter of the Academy of Arts and Sciences) nominee for Best Documentary.

A limited-edition (1,000) version of the Typeface DVD, including a letter-pressed poster by Bill Moran, Artistic Director of the Hamilton Wood Type Museum was released in April 2010. Cinetic Rights Management/Film Buff handled the digital release of the film, including iTunes and Netflix.

== See also ==
- Helvetica
