= The New Americans =

- Music by: Norman Arnold
- Country of origin: United States
- Original language: English

Production
- Producers: Steve James; Gordon Quinn; Gita Saedi
- Editors: David E. Simpson; Steve James
- Running time: 411 minutes

Original release
- Network: PBS
- Release: March 29 – March 31, 2004

The New Americans is a seven-hour American documentary, produced by Kartemquin Films, which was originally broadcast on American television over three nights on the Public Broadcasting Service (PBS) in late March 2004.

== Description ==
The observational documentary, which includes minimal voice-over narration and very little direct interviewing of its subjects (and none in which the interviewer's voice is heard), follows the lives of a series of immigrants to the United States over the course of four years. The series was filmed between 1998 and 2001, although not all of its subjects were filmed during that entire length of time. The immigrants were filmed both in their countries of origin before immigrating as well as in the United States. The filming during this period was extensive and occurred in the subjects' homes, at their places of work, in government offices, and in a number of other situations, many of them quite intimate. As a result, The New Americans offers an unusually personal and comprehensive look at the people it profiles.

== Topics ==
The immigrants profiled and filmed in The New Americans include many immigrants from diverse backgrounds:

- a group of baseball players from the Dominican Republic hoping to secure a career in Major League Baseball
- a computer programmer from India and his wife
- a family with six children from a farming community in the state of Guanajuato, Mexico
- a family of Ogoni refugees from Nigeria
- a woman from Palestine who moves to the United States to be with her new husband, a first-generation Palestinian-American who grew up in Chicago

The locations shown in the documentary include not only each of the immigrants' countries of origin, but also many places in the United States where the immigrants settled or traveled, including the locations of:

- Chicago (Palestinian and Nigerian immigrants)
- Silicon Valley, California (Indian immigrants)
- Garden City, Kansas and Mecca, California (Mexican immigrants)
- Florida, Georgia, and Montana (Dominican immigrants).

== Production ==
The New Americans was executive produced by Steve James (who also produced the acclaimed 1994 documentary Hoop Dreams) and Gordon Quinn, both of Kartemquin Films. It was broadcast on PBS as part of the series Independent Lens, in association with the Independent Television Service (ITVS). The program was also broadcast in the United Kingdom on the cable network BBC Four in early April 2004.

Steve James commented on the making of the New Americans, “From the beginning, we knew we wanted to tell multiple stories, because every immigrant I’ve met has a very rich and varied story to tell about where they come from. We also were excited about the idea of telling these people’s stories before they left their countries so that we could begin to understand these people in their own country before they gave it all up to come here. They’re all facing different problems different dreams, so there’s that diversity too. They’re a nice collection of stories because their differences and similarities.”

== Funding ==
Primary funding was provided by the Corporation for Public Broadcasting (CPB). Additional major funding was provided by The John D. and Catherine T. MacArthur Foundation, the Annie E. Casey Foundation and PBS. Additional funding also came from the National Endowment of the Arts, BBC, Nick Fraser, SBS, TV Australia, and VPRO, The Netherlands. The New Americans is a presentation of ITVS in association with Latino Public Broadcasting (LPB) and Asian Women United/National Asian American Telecommunications Association (NAATA).

== Awards ==
The New Americans won a variety of awards including: The Chicago Award for Best Chicago or Illinois Production, Chicago International Television Competition (2004); Gold Hugo for Best Overall Production, Chicago International Television Competition 2004]; Best Limited Series, Distinguished Documentary Achievement Awards, International Documentary Association (IDA) (2004); and the Christopher Award, TV/Cable Category, (2005).
