= The Last Pullman Car =

- Directed by: Gordon Quinn; Jerry Blumenthal
- Produced by: Gordon Quinn; Jerry Blumenthal
- Release date: 1983
- Running time: 56 minutes
- Country: United States
- Language: English

The Last Pullman Car is a 1983 feature-length documentary film produced by Kartemquin Films.

== Synopsis ==
The Last Pullman Car follows the efforts of the United Steelworkers Local 1834 to prevent the Pullman-Standard Company from shutting down operations in Pullman, Chicago. The plant had opened in 1864 when George Pullman began selling his famous railroad sleeping cars. Yet in 1891, the industrial empire began to break down, leaving the Pullman workers fighting for their jobs and the future of the American rail car industry. Ultimately, their efforts failed, as the local union was ignored by even their own national union and the plant was shuttered.

== Background ==
The film focuses on the conflict between labor unions and corporations, and was created during a time in the company's history when its directors were making industrial for-hire films to support their social-issue, union-focused documentaries.

== Accolades ==
The Last Pullman Car won first prize at the Athens International Film Festival and was broadcast on PBS. It was featured on the Learning Channel Independents Series and went on to screen at several other film festivals around the world.

== Legacy ==
The film's relevancy continues to the present day, and in 2011 it was screened in Pullman by South Side Projections to mark 30 years since the closure of the site.
