= As Goes Janesville =

- Film poster
- Directed by: Brad Lichtenstein
- Produced by: Brad Lichtenstein; Nicole Docta
- Edited by: Leslie Simmer
- Release date: May 16, 2012 (Milwaukee)
- Running time: 88 minutes
- Country: United States
- Language: English

As Goes Janesville is a 2012 independent documentary film, produced by Kartemquin Films and 371 Productions. It explores the future of the American middle class by focusing on the stories of Janesville, WI.

The film was broadcast on PBS through the Independent Lens program. It later played a successful festival run and was nominated for an Emmy award in Outstanding Investigative Journalism—Long-Form.

As Goes Janesville was funded by the Macarthur foundation and ITVS. It was directed by Brad Lichtenstein.

== Synopsis ==
As Goes Janesville follows the lives of residents of Janesville, Wisconsin. The close of a major GM plant in the city brings about massive layoffs and a desperate search for new work. Through the stories of business leaders, laid-off workers, and elected officials, the film examines the theme of the American Dream and how a town can reinvent itself in the face of economic upheaval.

== BizVizz ==
The film's storyline surrounding corporate transparency inspired the creation of BizVizz, a corporate accountability app. The app makes corporate tax and employment data accessible to consumers. The filmmakers' experiences with a company that received 20% of Janesville's budget in incentives without public vetting led to the creation of the partner app.
