= Beatrice Edna Tucker =

American obstetrician and gynecologist

- Born: October 4, 1897 or October 4, 1898; Carbondale, Pennsylvania
- Died: June 12, 1984; Chicago, Illinois
- Education: University of Chicago; Rush Medical College
- Occupation: obstetrician
- Medical career
- Institutions: Chicago Maternity Center; Northwestern University Feinberg School of Medicine

Beatrice Edna Tucker (October 4, 1897 or 1898 – June 12, 1984) was an American obstetrician and gynecologist. Tucker was the medical director of the Chicago Maternity Center for over forty years, providing access to home births for poor people in Chicago. She also worked as an advocate for equitable access to reproductive healthcare, lobbying for legalized abortion and access to birth control.

== Early life and education ==
Beatrice Edna Tucker was born in Carbondale, Pennsylvania. Various sources give her date of birth as either October 4, 1897 or October 4, 1898. Her father Evan Tucker, formerly a grocer, began practicing medicine after she was born despite not having a medical license. The family moved frequently to avoid lawsuits, although her father was eventually licensed as an optometrist. Tucker knew she wanted to be a doctor by the age of six, with the active encouragement of her father, despite the profession being unwelcoming to women.

Tucker attended Bradley University in Peoria and finished her bachelor's degree at the University of Chicago. She dropped out of attending Rush University Medical School twice before receiving her medical degree in 1922. After graduating, she worked in both private practice and in public health.

In 1929, she decided to pursue her interest in obstetrics. Although prominent obstetrician Joseph Bolivar DeLee disapproved of women doctors, Tucker wanted to study with him, starting a residency in his obstetrics program while he was out of town so he could not turn her down. By the end of her residency, she had impressed him so much that he asked her to head his obstetric clinic in a poor immigrant neighborhood, Chicago's Near West Side. The center, founded by DeLee in 1895, was originally known as the Maxwell Street Dispensary but was renamed the Chicago Maternity Center in 1932.

== Work at Chicago Maternity Center ==
Tucker became the Maternity Center director in 1932. She and co-director Harry B. Benaron created procedures that led to a lower mortality rate than many hospitals, including providing prenatal health consultations, a policy of non-intervention with the natural birth process, and rigorous self-investigation when something went wrong. The center was a combination of a clinic and school of obstetrics where medical students, residents and nurses could learn about delivering babies during a home birth, avoiding the impersonal, sometimes cruel environment of hospital maternity wards. According to history professor Carolyn Herbst Lewis, "By 1938, under the direction of the obstetrician Beatrice Tucker, DeLee's hand-picked and personally trained successor, the CMC was the largest outpatient obstetrical clinic in the country, garnering national and international acclaim."

The Maternity Center always struggled to gain sufficient funding, and by the 1960s, at-home births were becoming less frequent, in part because they were less profitable than hospital births. By 1971, Tucker had moved to a small apartment on the third floor of the center. In 1972, a group of hospitals announced plans for the Prentice Women's Hospital; supporters of the Chicago Maternity Center worried the new hospital would lead to the end of the Maternity Center. Tucker organized Women Act to Control Healthcare (WATCH) to save the center, along with other medical activists and community groups such as the Chicago Women's Liberation Union. The feature-length film The Chicago Maternity Center Story documents the meetings and demonstrations held to save the organization. The center's home birthing program was ended in 1973. Tucker decried the loss of home birth as an option for mothers, blaming "a displacement of patient safety and comfort by other concerns, including physician convenience, institutional prestige and profit, conformity with regulatory and licensing bodies, and issues surrounding insurance and liability."

Tucker stepped down as the medical director of the Chicago Maternity Center in 1973, after serving in that role for forty-one years.

== Later life, death, and legacy ==
After stepping down from her position at the Maternity Center in 1973, she was bored by retirement. Tucker went into private practice until 1975, when her partner Benaron died. She then worked at a West Side prenatal center run by the Chicago Board of Health.

Throughout the 1960s and 1970s Tucker was considered a leader in the renewed home birth movement. In addition to her medical practice, she was an activist for legalized abortion and access to birth control.

Tucker never married. She adopted two sons at their birth: Evan Thomas Tucker II and Peter Courtwright Tucker. She died June 12, 1984, at Illinois Masonic Hospital in Chicago.

Every year, the Northwestern University Feinberg School of Medicine awards the Department of Obstetrics and Gynecology Beatrice Tucker Award to a fourth year medical student for outstanding contributions to women's health.
