= The Phantom (2021 film) =

- Theatrical release poster
- Directed by: Patrick Forbes
- Written by: Patrick Forbes
- Produced by: Mark Bentley
- Cinematography: Tim Cragg
- Edited by: Claire Ferguson; Gregor Lyon
- Music by: Rob Manning
- Production companies: Oxford Films; Grain Media; Rooks Nest Entertainment; Hitchley Investments; Great Point Media
- Distributed by: Greenwich Entertainment
- Release dates: June 14, 2021 (Tribeca); July 2, 2021 (United States)
- Running time: 82 minutes
- Country: United States
- Language: English

The Phantom is a 2021 American documentary written and directed by Patrick Forbes. It follows Carlos DeLuna, who was arrested in 1983 for the murder of a woman, and protested his innocence until he was executed, stating another Carlos had committed the crime. Doug Liman serves as an executive producer.

== Release ==
The film had its world premiere at the Tribeca Film Festival on June 14, 2021. Prior to, Greenwich Entertainment acquired distribution rights to the film, and set it for a July 2, 2021, release.
