= Stevie (2002 film) =

- Directed by: Steve James
- Produced by: Steve James; Adam Singer; Gordon Quinn
- Cinematography: Dana Kupper; Gordon Quinn; Peter Gilbert
- Edited by: Steve James; Bill Haugse
- Music by: Dirk Powell
- Production companies: Kartemquin Films; Films Transit International
- Distributed by: Lions Gate Films
- Release date: 2002
- Running time: 145 minutes
- Country: United States
- Language: English

Stevie is a 2002 film by documentarian Steve James, and Kartemquin Films.

== Content ==
In 1995, James returned to Pomona, a rural town in Southern Illinois, USA. After 10 years with no contact, he attempts to reconnect with Stevie Fielding, a troubled young boy to whom he had been an 'Advocate Big Brother'. James's re-entry into Stevie's life is brief.

The story then picks up again about two years later after Stevie is charged with a serious crime. Through interviews with Stevie and his family and friends, James paints the portrait of a man who is still very troubled, while he tries to understand what led Stevie down the path of self-destruction.

== Post-release ==
Stevie was the winner of numerous festival awards, including the 2002 Amsterdam International Documentary Film Festival's Joris Ivens Award, given to that year's top documentary. The film was a 2003 nominee for Best Documentary at the Sundance Film Festival, as well as the Independent Spirit Awards.

By decade's end, Stevie was on numerous 'Best of the 2000s' list. In his list of 'Best Films of Any Genre', Ray Pride of NewCity Film, ranked Stevie at #19. Critic Collin Souter of Efilmcritic.com named Stevie the best documentary of the decade.

== Aftermath ==
Stephen Fielding was scheduled to be paroled on February 15, 2007. His original ten-year sentence was completed on October 29, 2009, and he was released from the Stateville Correctional Center.
