= The Homestretch (2014 film) =

- Theatrical film poster
- Directed by: Anne de Mare; Kirsten Kelly
- Produced by: Anne de Mare; Kirsten Kelly
- Cinematography: Anne de Mare; Kirsten Kelly
- Edited by: Leslie Simmer
- Music by: Greg Kalember
- Production companies: Kartemquin Films; Spargel Productions
- Distributed by: The Orchard; Bullfrog Films; Java Films; Independent Lens
- Release dates: April 16, 2014 (HotDocs); September 12, 2014 (United States)
- Running time: 89 minutes
- Country: United States
- Language: English

The Homestretch is a 2014 American documentary film produced and directed by Anne de Mare and Kirsten Kelly. De Mare and Kelly intended the film to serve as a challenge to the negative stereotypes of youth homelessness. The film premiered at the 2014 HotDocs Film Festival on April 26, 2014. It went on to play at the 2014 AFI Docs Film Festival and the 2014 Human Rights Watch Film Festival.

Independent Lens, The Orchard, Bull Frog Films, and Java Films acquired distribution rights to the film. Independent Lens broadcast the film nationally on PBS, while The Orchard released it through digital platforms on November 21, 2014.

== Synopsis ==
The film follows three homeless teenagers as they brave Chicago winters, the pressures of high school, and life alone on the streets.

== Reception ==
The film received a positive response from critics.

- It was the recipient of the 2016 Emmy Award for Outstanding Business & Economic Reporting - Long Form.
- Ben Sachs of the Chicago Reader said that "Directors Anne De Mare and Kirsten Kelly persuasively indict America's failure to assist homeless teenagers, which a title estimates at 1.6 million people. Yet the stories they present are genuinely uplifting, charting the lives of three homeless Chicago teens as they find housing, complete their high school educations, and ready themselves for the adult world."
- Keith Uhlich of The A.V. Club gave the film a positive review and said: "This empathetic documentary is a portrait of three juveniles—Roque, Kasey, and Anthony—and their struggle to extricate themselves from itinerancy."
- In his review for The Village Voice, Danny King said: "'The Homestretch' is ultimately a humane accomplishment."
- Glenn Kenney wrote for Roger Ebert's website "Its intimacy is a reflection of its compassion."
