= Carlos DeLuna =

American murderer (1962–1989)

- Born: March 15, 1962; Corpus Christi, Texas, U.S.
- Died: December 7, 1989 (aged 27); Huntsville Unit, Texas, U.S.
- Status: Executed by lethal injection
- Convictions: Capital murder Attempted rape Unauthorized use of a motor vehicle
- Penalty: Death

Carlos DeLuna (/dəˈluːnə/; March 15, 1962 – December 7, 1989) was an American man who was convicted of murder and executed by the State of Texas for killing Wanda Lopez, a 24-year-old gas station attendant in Corpus Christi, on the evening of February 4, 1983. Since DeLuna's execution by lethal injection in 1989, doubts have been raised about the conviction and the question of his guilt.

An investigation published by the Columbia Human Rights Law Review in May 2012 has strengthened these claims of innocence by detailing a large amount of evidence suggesting the actual murderer was Carlos Hernandez, a similar-looking man who lived in a nearby neighborhood. Hernandez allegedly told at least five people that he, not DeLuna, was the murderer of Wanda Lopez. In 2021, DeLuna's case and claims of innocence were the subject of the documentary film The Phantom.

DeLuna admitted to being present for the murder, but refused to identify by name the man whom he said was the actual killer, frustrating his own lawyers.

== Crime ==
Carlos DeLuna was charged with killing a gas station attendant, 24-year-old Wanda Lopez, on the evening of February 4, 1983, in Corpus Christi, Texas. The young woman died from multiple stab wounds, apparently from a buck knife. Lopez was killed while on the phone with the police, having just called 911 to report a suspicious person who turned out to be her killer. The crime was particularly senseless because, according to the 911 tape, Lopez seemed to be giving her attacker the money at the time she was stabbed, saying "You want it? I'll give it to you. I'll give it to you. I'm not going to do nothing to you. Please!"

=== Eyewitnesses ===
The crime was observed by two eyewitnesses. The first, Kevan Baker, had stopped for gas at the Shamrock gas station. As he approached the office to ask the attendant to activate the pumps, he saw an unshaven man in a flannel shirt inside the gas station struggling with Lopez and trying to drag her by her hair to the back of the station. As he released Lopez, her assailant was seen by Baker, then he headed out of the station, coming face-to-face with Baker. Sergeant Steve Fowler reported that Baker said the man told him, "I got a gun. Get back," but Baker testified in court the man simply said, "Don't mess with me." Baker then reported the man ran away from the store, the exact direction in which he ran being a source of debate given conflicting wording from various reports. In his police report, Sergeant Fowler reported that Baker told him the attacker "ran east from the store." Baker testified at the trial that the attacker "ran in an easterly direction." On the other hand, Sergeant Olivia Escobedo's report indicated Baker had said the man "fled off behind the station." The original police radio alert from the scene (from Sergeant Bruno Mejia) reported the suspect was "northbound on foot, to the rear" of the store. Police also reported several other bystanders saying they'd seen a man "running to the rear of the store." Baker then saw Lopez staggering out of the station saying "help me, help me" before she slumped to the ground. Baker attempted to help her, and went inside the station to grab some paper towels to stanch the bleeding until the police and paramedics arrived.

George Aguirre also witnessed the attack. Aguirre stopped for gas at the Shamrock station at approximately 8 p.m. As he was filling his van with gas, he saw a man standing just outside the gas station store, wearing either "blue pants" and a "long-sleeved T-shirt", or dark pants and a white shirt with sleeves rolled up. The man was drinking beer and playing with a knife like the one used to kill Lopez. Nervous about the knife, Aguirre watched the man closely as he pumped his gas. The man approached Aguirre and asked for a ride to the Casino Club, a local bar. The man offered to pay for the ride and showed Aguirre a black wallet containing a "few" bills inside. Aguirre declined, but was concerned about the knife, so when he went inside to pay for his gas he told the cashier, victim Lopez, to call the police. As Aguirre returned to his van, he saw the man heading into the gas station. Aguirre drove off and made a U-turn onto the adjacent freeway, and when he looked back, he saw the man and victim Lopez struggling inside the store. Aguirre pulled off the freeway and drove to a nearby bowling alley to ask a security guard to call the police. He then returned to the Shamrock at about the time the police began arriving. Aguirre identified DeLuna that evening as the man he had seen with the knife, except DeLuna no longer had on the white shirt. Aguirre was not asked to identify DeLuna at trial.

At around the same time, John and Julie Arsuaga were pulling into a nearby club when they observed a Hispanic man jogging towards the east, away from the Shamrock, in an untucked white dress shirt with the sleeves rolled up and dark "uniform-style" pants. Both witnesses identified DeLuna at trial as the man they saw running away from the Shamrock gas station.

=== Police dispatcher and pursuit of suspects ===
The Columbia University team documented numerous discrepancies in the various accounts from police radio alerts, police reports, eyewitnesses, and other bystanders:

- Baker - who came face-to-face with the attacker after the attack - told police the suspect was "wearing a light colored shirt and dark pants," dressed shabbily, wearing a flannel shirt under a gray sweatshirt; the Arsuagas insisted the man they saw jogging near the store wore a white dress shirt with the sleeves rolled up, untucked and "uniform-type" pants
- Aguirre told police that the man he saw with the knife wore "a white shirt (long-sleeve), untucked, and dark pants;" the Arsuagas told police the subject they saw running was "wearing a white long-sleeve shirt untucked and unbuttoned"
- The first police radio alert advised of a suspect "northbound on foot, to the rear" of the store; other people in the area reported to police they had seen a man running northbound. The Arsuagas reported the man they saw was jogging eastward, a few hundred yards east of the store.
- Baker reported that the suspect had a mustache and approximately 10 days worth of growth in his beard. The Arsuagas reported that the man they saw jogging from the store was "clean shaven."
- Columbia University researchers showed early 1980s photos of Carlos DeLuna and Carlos Hernandez to numerous family members and acquaintances of the men; many of these people were unable to correctly identify the two men.

Police arrived shortly after Lopez's 911 phone call ended and spread out across the area searching for the suspect. The police radio traffic describing the manhunt reveals a chaotic search, with police pursuing several leads towards differing locations with varying suspect descriptions. After first chasing a suspect - repeatedly identified in police radio calls as a male suspect - fleeing on foot several blocks away and further north of the store, police received a 911 call from a neighborhood resident Esther Barrera, who saw someone hiding under a truck in front of her home. Police briefly detained a female several blocks from where they last reported to be chasing the suspect. Police also briefly stopped a car described as "a blue Mercury or LTD" and occupied by "two Hispanic males" in the area of the chase for the suspect.

=== Arrest ===
Police eventually found DeLuna, 30–40 minutes after the crime, hiding under a parked truck a few blocks away from the Shamrock gas station. Despite it being a cold February night, he wore no shoes or shirt and was lying in a puddle of water. The police pulled him out, and found that he had a black wallet containing two one-dollar bills in his rear pocket, and a "wad" or "clump" of bills totaling $149 in the front pocket of his dark pants.

Despite the extremely bloody crime scene, no blood was ever found on Carlos DeLuna. Allan Bayle, a forensic expert assisting the Columbia team, opined that Lopez was behind the counter handing her attacker the money, while the attacker remained in front of the counter. This opinion conflicts with the report of two eyewitnesses to the attack (Baker and Aguirre) who both said they saw the attacker wrestling with Lopez. Baker told police he saw the attacker attempting to drag Lopez by the hair into a room at the back of the store.

== Pretrial investigations ==
The police put DeLuna in the back seat of a patrol car and brought him to the crime scene for a "show-up." After initial hesitation about participating in the "show-up" due to fear, both Baker and Aguirre looked into the police car and identified DeLuna as the man they'd seen attack Lopez. Interviewed in 2004, Baker told the Columbia team that he was "seventy percent" sure the man in the police car was the man he had seen fleeing the store. He also said he was trying to be very careful when identifying the man because "This is a human being's life” and "it’s tough you know to identify cross cultures. I didn’t wanna be, I didn’t wanna screw anybody." The Arsuagas were too afraid to participate in the "show-up" at the gas station, but John picked DeLuna out of a photo line-up later that evening, and both positively identified DeLuna at trial.

At the time of his arrest, DeLuna had fresh fingernail scratches under his right arm and on his face, and he appeared unshaven.

Photos of the scene show an open cash drawer, the bill slots empty, and a $5 bill on the floor. Shamrock's area manager, Pete Gonzalez, testified that approximately $166 was missing from the inventory since he had personally inventoried it 4 days before the crime, whereas it was typically only off by around $25–50 over the period of an entire week. Twenty-two years later, the Corpus Christi location's store manager from 1982 to 1990, Jeff Stange, told investigators that 1) the inventory being $166 short of the last inventory count was not an unusual amount, 2) per store policy, Lopez most likely would have had no more than $75 in cash in the register at the time of the attack, and 3) he recalled that "somewhere between 70 and 134 dollars" was missing from inventory.

Two days after the crime, a nearby homeowner was mowing his grass and found white track-type shoes and a white shirt on his property. Forensic tests on the shirt and shoes were negative for blood, and no blood was found on the pants DeLuna was wearing when he was arrested or on the wad of money that was in his pocket.

Prior to trial, DeLuna was examined by two psychiatrists to determine whether he might have a mental defense. DeLuna told both of them that he had no recollection of being arrested and that he had total amnesia about the night in question. Following a court ordered psychiatric evaluation by Dr Kutnick, DeLuna was found competent to stand trial, with Dr Kutnick even suspecting DeLuna to have been faking his memory loss and intentionally performing poorly on the tests given to him.

== The trial ==
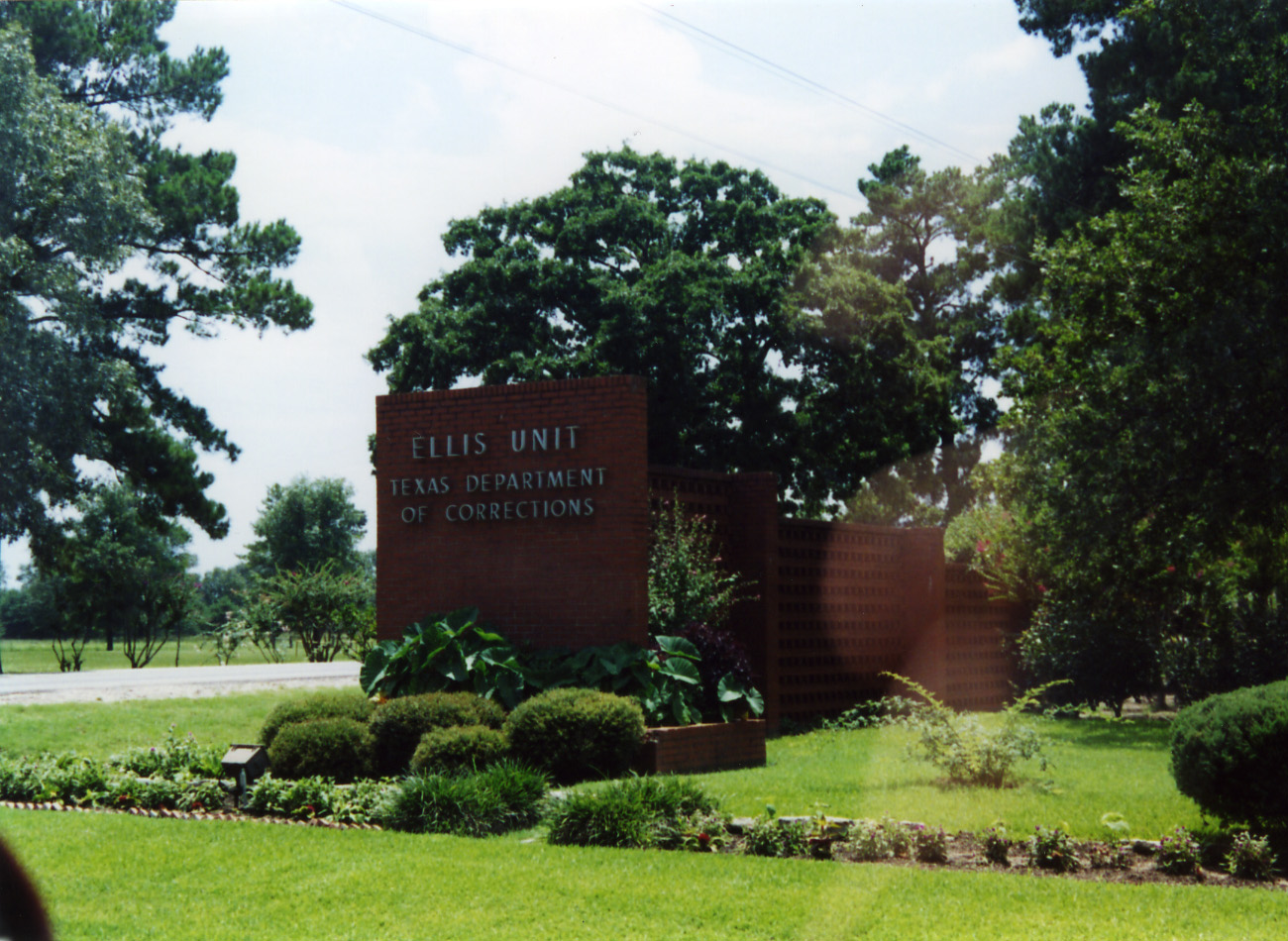
Ellis Unit, where DeLuna was held on death row

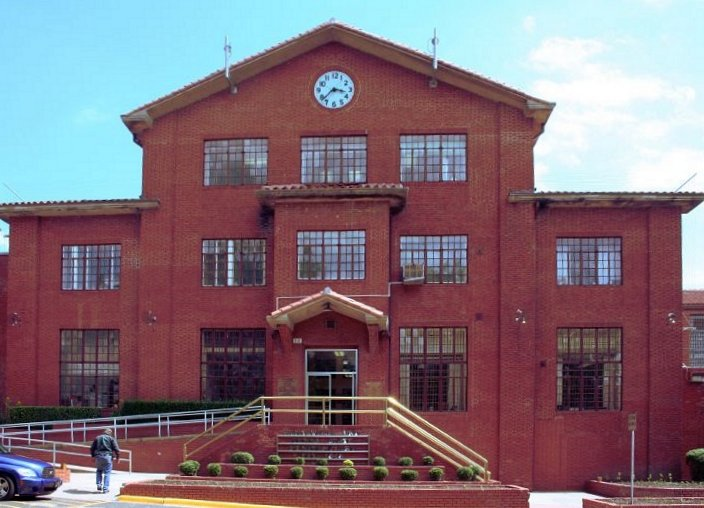
Huntsville Unit, where DeLuna was executed

Two attorneys were appointed to represent DeLuna at trial. The first, Hector De Pena Jr., was the son of a local judge and a former Deputy District Attorney and County prosecutor who had been in practice since 1972. After the trial, De Pena was elected to the bench, where he has remained. Since De Pena had never represented a criminal defendant in front of a jury on any kind of serious criminal charge, the judge also appointed a seasoned criminal defense attorney, Jimmy Lawrence, to serve as the "first chair" trial attorney. As the more experienced attorney, Lawrence conducted most of the direct and cross-examinations, and gave the closing argument in both the guilt and penalty phases.

DeLuna took the stand in his own defense and testified as follows: He spent the early evening with two sisters, Mary Ann Perales and Linda Perales. A man named Carlos Hernandez approached them. Although DeLuna did not originally recognize Hernandez, after talking to him he realized that they had known each other as kids. DeLuna testified that he was wearing a blue shirt, black pants, and black slip-on shoes. Thereafter, DeLuna and Hernandez went to a bar named Wolfy's, located directly across the street from the Shamrock gas station. Hernandez said he was going over to the Shamrock to buy something, so DeLuna ordered a beer at Wolfy's and waited. DeLuna began wondering why Hernandez was taking so long, so he stepped outside Wolfy's to see what was going on. DeLuna could see across the street and into the Shamrock and observed Hernandez attacking Lopez. Worried that people might say he was involved with Hernandez, DeLuna started walking away on Dodd toward Nemec (i.e., not in the direction of the Phase III where the Arsuagas saw a man running). When DeLuna heard sirens, he started running. He testified that his shirt was ripped clean from his body while climbing over a fence. The rolled up bundle of bills in his pocket was from two recent paychecks.

On cross-examination, DeLuna was asked about the white shirt and shoes that were found in a nearby yard, and he testified that they were not his. DeLuna admitted that he was a twice convicted felon and that he had lied to the psychiatrists who examined him. DeLuna admitted he was unable to identify Carlos Hernandez from his mugshot.

The prosecution offered rebuttal evidence to show that 1) one of the sisters that DeLuna claimed to have been with that evening, Mary Anne Perales, was actually attending her baby shower, 2) DeLuna lied about his whereabouts that afternoon to his parole officer, and 3) DeLuna frequented the Casino Club. Carlos Hernandez was also known to be a regular at the Casino Club.

After deliberating for four and a half hours, the jury convicted DeLuna of capital murder. At the penalty phase, the prosecution introduced evidence that DeLuna had committed two attempted rapes. The prosecution called Juanita Garcia, the 54-year-old invalid mother of DeLuna's best friend. DeLuna attempted to rape her just two days after his release from prison on an earlier conviction for attempted rape, breaking three of Garcia's ribs. This incident caught DeLuna's lawyers by surprise, since he had only been charged with misdemeanor assault in this incident so they did not thoroughly investigate it. The jury deliberated for six hours before deciding that DeLuna was likely to reoffend, whereupon the judge sentenced him to death.

One of DeLuna's lawyers, Hector De Peña, believes that DeLuna and Carlos Hernandez robbed the convenience store together, but "DeLuna was in front of the counter with Hernandez when Hernandez leapt over the counter and stabbed Lopez." De Peña suggests that DeLuna was afraid to identify Hernandez: "He didn't want to risk possibly getting hurt in the county jail or even killed on the street."

DeLuna's other lawyer, James Lawrence, said, "If you tell me they killed the wrong guy, I don't know," and that "it still bothers me to this day" that DeLuna refused to identify Hernandez from photos. Lawrence added, "Of course he was guilty."

== Subsequent investigations ==
In a death row interview, DeLuna told a local news reporter, "I was standing there when somebody else did what they did, you know. But I don't want to name no names." Commenting on his death sentence in a television interview a few years before his execution, DeLuna said, "Maybe one day the truth will come out. I'm hoping it will. If I end up getting executed for this, I don't think it's right."

In June 2006, the Chicago Tribune published a series of investigative news stories that examined evidence that DeLuna may have been convicted in error.

Extensive further research on the case was published in May 2012 by the Columbia Human Rights Law Review. Their lengthy report is based on six years of research by law professor and anti-death penalty advocate James Liebman and 12 students from Columbia Law School in New York. Their team went through the case, interviewed more than 100 witnesses, and examined up to 900 source files.

Both investigations focused on DeLuna's claim that another man, Carlos Hernandez, had committed the crime. Police had not investigated Hernandez for the murder, and at trial, prosecutor Steve Schiwetz referred to Hernandez as a "phantom" because DeLuna was unable to identify any specific individual as the Carlos Hernandez he was placing the blame on, despite having been shown mug shots of every Carlos Hernandez in the Corpus Christi system (including the Carlos Hernandez that the Columbia team later focused on). According to DeLuna's sister, even his trial lawyers did not believe the "Carlos Hernandez" story. According to the Chicago Tribune "Not only was he [Hernandez] well-known to police in this Gulf Coast city as a violent felon, but the co-prosecutor at De Luna's trial and the lead detective in the case knew Hernandez too. [...] Jurors heard none of that information. The prosecutor sat silently as his colleague branded Hernandez a figment of De Luna's imagination."

The Chicago Tribune and Columbia University teams rather easily discovered extensive details about and acquaintances of the Carlos Hernandez to whom DeLuna had long referred. Hernandez, who died from cirrhosis in a Texas prison in 1999, was a career criminal living in the same neighborhood and had a history of assaulting women, robbing gas stations, and carrying knives. The Columbia team found people who knew Hernandez and said he bragged to them about murdering Lopez and letting DeLuna take the blame. They also learned Hernandez had been arrested as a suspect – before charges were dropped – in the death of a woman, Dahlia Sauceda, killed several years earlier in the same area of Corpus Christi. Sauceda's body was found with a large "X" carved in her back via knife. Hernandez also later served 19 months (of a 10-year sentence) in prison for stabbing another woman, Dina Ybanez, with a lock-blade knife nearly identical to the one used in the Lopez killing.

The Columbia report documented numerous cases in which Hernandez was arrested while in possession of lock-blade knives similar to the one used to kill Lopez. Additionally, numerous people interviewed by the Columbia team said they knew Hernandez carried lock-blade knives. (Conversely, Carlos DeLuna was never in possession of a knife at the time of any of his many arrests during his lifetime.) The report also argued there were problems with the show-up identification of DeLuna by Baker, the preservation of the crime scene, failure by the prosecution to disclose exculpatory evidence, and DeLuna's representation by overworked and inexperienced defense counsel.

The Columbia report has drawn criticism from some officials in Corpus Christi. Nueces County District Attorney Mark Skurka, who was not involved with DeLuna's case and had not read the Columbia report, said that the researchers are arguing the same issues and complained that "[those] people have already made up their mind, it doesn't matter what anyone says." Corpus Christi police investigator Paul Rivera says that at the Columbia team's request, he reviewed the police and trial records but continued to believe DeLuna killed Lopez. On the other hand, Wanda Lopez's brother, Richard, issued a statement in June 2006 saying, "After carefully reviewing the information recently uncovered and printed by Steve Mills and Maurice Possley in the Chicago Tribune, I am convinced that Carlos DeLuna did not kill my sister and that Carlos Hernandez was the real murderer."

== Documentary ==
In 2021 DeLuna's case and claims of innocence were the subjects of the documentary film The Phantom. It was based primarily on the work of Liebman and his team.

== See also ==
- At the Death House Door
- Cameron Todd Willingham
- Capital punishment debate in the United States
- Capital punishment in Texas
- Capital punishment in the United States
- Carroll Pickett
- List of people executed in Texas, 1982–1989
- List of people executed in the United States in 1989
- List of wrongful convictions in the United States
- Reasonable doubt
- Texas Moratorium Network
- Wrongful executions in the United States
