= Inquiring Nuns =

1968 film

- Directed by: Gerald Temaner; Gordon Quinn
- Starring: Sister Marie Arné; Sister Mary Campion
- Cinematography: Gordon Quinn
- Edited by: Gordon Quinn
- Music by: Philip Glass
- Distributed by: Kartemquin Films
- Release date: 1968
- Running time: 66 minutes
- Country: US
- Language: English

Inquiring Nuns is a 1968 Kartemquin Films production directed by Gordon Quinn and Gerald Temaner. The documentary film features Sisters Marie Arné and Mary Campion, two young Catholic nuns who visit a variety of Chicago locales to ask people the question, "Are you happy?" They meet a variety of individuals ranging from hippie musicians to intellectuals, whose responses are everything from the mundane to the spiritual. The film was directly influenced by Jean Rouch's Chronique d'un été, which Quinn and Temaner had watched at Doc Films while they were undergraduates at the University of Chicago. The film was shot on Kartemquin's "Camera #1," a custom-modified crystal sync Auricon with a used manual zoom lens Quinn purchased from Albert Maysles, and to which he added a World War II gunner handle bought from a pawn shop as an extra grip for steadiness.

Quinn and Temaner's fourth collaboration was produced for about $16,000 ($110,005 US in 2016) for Chicago's Catholic Adult Education Center which never suggested any changes or requested a single edit. Both Sisters Marie Arné (now Kathleen Reinmuth) and Mary Campion (now Catherine Rock) served at the St. Denis Parish in Chicago's Southwest Side at the time of the filming. They subsequently left the sisterhood within a few years after the film's release, the former eventually becoming a family counselor in the Chicago suburbs and the latter a school superintendent in Florida. One of the random people they encountered in the film was Stepin Fetchit who showed a few of his publicity shots and stated that he was happy.

An Official Selection of the 1968 Chicago International Film Festival, Inquiring Nuns features music by the then relatively unknown composer Philip Glass (Truman Show, The Fog of War) who was paid $100 ($688 US in 2016) for earning his first film credit.

Entertainment Weekly graded Inquiring Nuns an 'A' and applauded the film's "reaffirmation of the virtue of conventional wisdom."

In 2018, Kartemquin received a grant from the National Film Preservation Foundation for a new restoration of the original 16mm print, and collaborated with Argot Pictures on a 50th Anniversary release of the film in US theaters.

== See also ==
- List of American films of 1968
