= No Crossover: The Trial of Allen Iverson =

- Directed by: Steve James
- Produced by: Steve James; Gordon Quinn; Emily Hart; Adam Singer; Arunima Dhar
- Cinematography: Keith Walker
- Edited by: Steve James
- Music by: Leo Sidran
- Release date: March 2010 (SXSW)
- Running time: 80 minutes
- Country: United States
- Language: English

No Crossover: The Trial of Allen Iverson is a 2010 documentary film produced by Kartemquin Films for ESPN's 30 for 30 series and directed by Steve James. No Crossover details a 1993 brawl involving then-high school basketball player and future NBA star Allen Iverson, and how the incident—and the subsequent trial and eventual conviction of Iverson—divided the city of Hampton, Virginia, where Iverson attended Bethel High School.

== Documentary ==
The documentary features camcorder footage from the February 14, 1993 altercation at a Hampton bowling alley, where Iverson and his young friends were accused of attacking adults with chairs. The incident allegedly stemmed from racial epithets said by the white adult high school students from neighboring Poquoson to Iverson and his friends. Iverson was specifically accused of striking a young white woman in the head with a chair, as stated in witness testimony from bowling lane employee Brandon Smith, who also was a classmate of Iverson's. The videotape of the incident is unclear and it is difficult to make out any of the individuals involved. Despite punches thrown by both parties involved, only Iverson and his friends Melvin Stephens, Samuel Wynn and Michael Simmons, were charged in the incident. Iverson was sentenced to 15 years in prison, but after four months at Newport News City Farm correctional facility, Iverson was pardoned by Governor Doug Wilder and was released from custody.

Director Steve James, a Hampton native, takes a personal look at how the Iverson incident and the ensuing aftermath highlighted the community's existing racial tension and put the town's problems of race relations front and center in the daily papers. The film introduces multiple Hampton natives, both black and white, as they reflect on how the incident affected the town. While Iverson refused to participate in the documentary, multiple friends, neighbors and former coaches provided insight into the life of the young Iverson.

== Release ==
Premiering at the 2010 SXSW Festival in Austin, No Crossover would make its television premiere on ESPN on April 13, 2010. On the night of ESPN's No Crossover premiere, the phrase 'Allen Iverson' was the sixth most popular trending topic across all forms of social media and by the end of the broadcast, reached number one as the most popular phrase according to the Brizzly platform that measures Facebook and Twitter activity.

== American Documentary Showcase ==
On January 15, 2011, the United States Department of State's Bureau of Educational and Cultural Affairs chose No Crossover as one of 18 documentaries represented in the American Documentary Showcase. As an official selection of the American Documentary Showcase, No Crossover will be sent to more than 20 countries around the world to help cultivate a global understanding of American social issues.

== See also ==
- List of basketball films
