= Kartemquin Films =

Film production company of Chicago

Kartemquin Films is a four-time Oscar-nominated 501(c)3 non-profit production company located in Chicago, Illinois, that produces a wide range of documentary films. It is the documentary filmmaking home of acclaimed producers such as Gordon Quinn (A Good Man), Steve James (Hoop Dreams), Peter Gilbert (Hoop Dreams; At the Death House Door), Maria Finitzo (Mapping Stem Cell Research: Terra Incognita; In the Game), Joanna Rudnick (In the Family), Bing Liu (Minding the Gap), Aaron Wickenden (Almost There), and Ashley O’Shay (Unapologetic).

The organization was founded in 1966 by Gordon Quinn, Jerry Temaner and Stan Karter, three University of Chicago graduates who wanted to make documentary films guided by their principle of "Cinematic Social Inquiry". They were soon joined by Jerry Blumenthal, who remained an integral part of the organization until he died on November 13, 2014. Gordon Quinn remained Executive Director through late 2008 when he transitioned to Artistic Director, and Justine Nagan was named Executive Director. In 2015, Betsy Steinberg, former managing director of the Illinois Film Office, was named the new Executive Director until 2018. In 2019, Jolene Pinder was named Executive Director. Pinder left the organization in 2020. In 2022, co-founder and artistic director Gordon Quinn transitioned to a senior advisor role; after a nationwide, yearlong search, in October 2022 Kartemquin hired Amir George as its second artistic director in its history. Less than a year later, George was no longer with the organization.

In 2015, Gordon Quinn was announced as the International Documentary Association's Career Achievement Award recipient for his contributions to documentary filmmaking on over 50 films, and his services to the field through advocacy around fair use and public media.

In 2016, Kartemquin's 50th anniversary was recognized with awards from Ashland International Film Festival; Chicago International Music and Movies Festival (CIMMfest); the Peace on Earth Film Festival; and the Chicago Latino Film Festival, and with retrospectives at Hot Docs; UCLA Film and Television Archives; the University of Chicago's Doc Films; and on Chicago's PBS Station WTTW, and with an art and equipment exhibition at the City of Chicago Department of Cultural Affairs and Special Events' Expo 72 gallery.

== History ==
Kartemquin Educational Films was started in 1966 by three University of Chicago graduates, Gordon Quinn, Jerry Temaner, and Stan Karter. The company was started to make politically engaged and socially charged documentary films that would use Quinn and Temaner's thesis Cinematic Social Inquiry as a base point.

Kartemquin's first film in 1966, Home for Life—a chronicle of two elderly people entering a home for the aged—established the direction the organization would take over the next four decades. After the initial success of the late 1960s films Kartemquin evolved into a film collective producing films such as The Chicago Maternity Center Story and the Taylor Chain films. However, after these and some other films were released the collective disbanded in the late 1970s due to differing opinions on the direction the company should head. After the dissolution of the collective, co-founders Gordon Quinn and Jerry Blumenthal (who died in late 2014) pushed the organization to its current model, producing high quality works that still had a political edge and mentoring a new generation of young documentary makers. They continued releasing social-issue documentaries (The Last Pullman Car, Golub) largely for public television and the educational market into the 1990s.

Kartemquin's best known film, the Oscar-nominated Hoop Dreams, won several major critics prizes and journalism awards in 1995 and was named on over 150 "ten best" lists. Filmmakers Steve James, Peter Gilbert and Frederick Marx examined the complex role basketball plays in the lives of two inner-city high school players. After receiving the Audience Award at the Sundance Film Festival, Hoop Dreams was released theatrically by Fine Line Features and became the highest grossing documentary at that time and one of highest-rated documentaries broadcast on PBS.

Since Hoop Dreams, Kartemquin has continued producing films that examine and critique society by following the stories of real people. At the Death House Door premiered at SXSW, and went on to win awards at Full Frame and other festivals. Their documentary, Terra Incognita: Mapping Stem Cell Research, follows Dr. Jack Kessler of Northwestern University in his search for a cure for spinal cord injuries using embryonic stem cells. Other notable documentaries have included: The New Americans, a seven-hour miniseries for PBS that follows immigrant families from five different countries; Stevie; Refrigerator Mothers; 5 Girls; and Vietnam, Long Time Coming. In 2007, Kartemquin Films received the MacArthur Award for Creative and Effective Institutions. In 2009, Kartemquin's Executive Director Justine Nagan directed the film Typeface.

The 2010s saw Kartemquin producing films at the fastest rate yet. With several award-winning documentaries being released in these years, including The Homestretch, Life Itself, The Trials of Muhammad Ali, and In the Game.

In 2016, Kartemquin celebrated its 50-year anniversary. The event was widely recognized throughout Chicago and the world with Kartemquin receiving awards from Ashland International Film Festival; Chicago International Music and Movies Festival (CIMMfest); the Peace on Earth Film Festival; and the Chicago Latino Film Festival.

In 2018, Kartemquin received two Academy Award nominations, for Edith+Eddie & Abacus: Small Enough to Jail. In 2019, Kartemquin's Minding the Gap was nominated for the Academy Award, and also won a Peabody Award. Kartemquin was also recognized with an institutional Peabody Award.

== Later works ==
Films that were recently completed include Raising Bertie (2016), an intimate six year portrait of three African American boys growing into adulthood in rural North Carolina, exploring complex relationships between generational poverty, educational inequity, and race; In the Game(2015), examining the roles of Title IX legislation and a dedicated coach in the lives of U.S. female athletes through the story of a Chicago high school girls' soccer team; Almost There (2014) which follows the remarkable journey of two filmmakers and their relationship with an artist whose past hides a terrible secret; The Homestretch (2014), which follows three homeless teens in Chicago as they brave life alone on the streets, and Life Itself (2014) which recounts the surprising and entertaining life of world-renowned film critic and social commentator Roger Ebert—a story that turns personal, wistful, funny, painful, and transcendent.

In 2013, Kartemquin released several highly regarded films including: On Beauty, which follows former fashion photographer Rick Guidotti, who after 15 years of working for clients such as Yves Saint Laurent, Elle, and Harpers Bazaar, grew tired of seeing the same ideal of beauty and who now works towards redefining the standards; American Arab, in which an Iraqi-American filmmaker explores the diverse experiences of people living as Arabs in the U.S.; The Trials of Muhammad Ali, which recounts legendary boxer Muhammad Ali's battle to overturn a five-year prison sentence he received for refusing U.S. military service during the Vietnam War.

In 2011, A Good Man and The Interrupters were released and garnered wide praise from the film community. A Good Man examines Bill T. Jones' Ravinia Festival interpretive dance piece inspired by Abraham Lincoln and interrogates the myths surrounding political heroes in general, and The Interrupters tells the story of a group of men and women in Chicago—most of them former gang leaders—who now work for CeaseFire, an organization that interrupts shootings and crimes in Chicago.

The Interrupters was released to critical and audience acclaim. The film won several awards, including "Best Documentary" from the 2012 Independent Spirit Awards, as well as "Outstanding Achievement in Nonfiction Feature Filmmaking" and "Best Direction" from Cinema Eye Honors. Film critic Roger Ebert called the film "mighty and heart-rending."

== Filmography ==
- Home for Life (1966)
- Thumbs Down (1968)
- Inquiring Nuns (1968)
- Parents (1968)
- Anonymous Artists of America (1970)
- What the Fuck Are These Red Squares? (1970)
- Marco (1970)
- Hum 255 (1970)
- Sports-Action Pro-Files (1972)
- Winnie Wright, Age 11 (1974)
- Viva la Causa (1974)
- Trick Bag (1974)
- Now We Live on Clifton (1974)
- UE/Wells 1975
- HSA Hospital Strike '75 (1975)
- Where's I.W. Abel? (1975)
- What's Happening at Local 70? (1975)
- The Chicago Maternity Center Story (1976)
- Taylor Chain I: A Story in a Local Union (1980)
- The Last Pullman Car (1983)
- Taylor Chain II: A Story of Collective Bargaining (1984)
- Women's Voices: The Gender Gap (1984)
- Golub (1988)
- Grassroots Chicago (1991)
- Higher Goals (1992)
- Hoop Dreams (1994)
- Chicago Crossings: Bridges and Boundaries (1994)
- When Billy Broke His Head (1995)
- Vietnam, Long Time Coming (1998)
- 5 Girls (2001)
- Stevie (2002)
- Refrigerator Mothers (2003)
- The New Americans (2004)
- Golub: Late Works Are the Catastrophes (2004)
- Terra Incognita (2007)
- At the Death House Door (2008)
- Milking the Rhino (2008)
- In The Family (2008)
- Typeface (2009)
- Sacred Transformations (2010)
- Prisoner of Her Past (2010)
- No Crossover: The Trial of Allen Iverson (2010)
- The Interrupters (2011)
- A Good Man (2011)
- As Goes Janesville (2012)
- The Trials of Muhammad Ali (2013)
- American Arab (2013)
- Life Itself (2014)
- The Homestretch (2014)
- On Beauty (2014)
- The School Project (2014)
- Almost There (2014)
- Saving Mes Aynak (2014)
- In the Game (2015)
- Hard Earned (2015)
- Unbroken Glass (2016)
- Raising Bertie (2016)
- Abacus: Small Enough to Jail (2016)
- All The Queen's Horses (2017)
- Edith+Eddie (2017)
- 63 Boycott (2017)
- Keep Talking (2017)
- America to Me (2018)
- Minding the Gap (2018)
- Cooked: Survival by Zip Code (2018)
- Eating Up Easter (2018)
- Dilemma of Desire (2020)
- Finding Yingying (2020)
- Represent (2020)
- The First Step (2021)
- The Ants and the Grasshopper (2021)
