= Golub (film) =

Golub (1988) Golub: Late Works Are The Catastrophes (2004)
- Golub/Spero
- Directed by: Jerry Blumenthal; Gordon Quinn
- Produced by: Jerry Blumenthal; Gordon Quinn
- Cinematography: Gordon Quinn
- Edited by: Jerry Blumenthal
- Distributed by: Kartemquin Films
- Release date: 1988
- Running time: 80 minutes
- Country: United States
- Language: English

Golub is a 1988 documentary film, produced by Kartemquin Films, that examines the life and work of controversial painter, Leon Golub. Inspired by war, political oppression and the fight for Free Speech, Golub and his paintings are famous for their depictions of extreme violence. Also featured prominently in the film is his wife, anti-war feminist and artist, Nancy Spero. The documentary tracks Golub from starting with a blank canvas to a touring North American exhibition and eventually to an exhibition in Northern Ireland.

In 2001, the filmmakers revisited Leon Golub in his final years, and in 2004 released the documentary, Golub: Late Works Are The Catastrophes. With his previous work being more relevant than ever in the aftermath of September 11, Golub's later paintings have become less graphic and violent. At one point, Golub admits, "my work these days is sort of political, sort of metaphysical, and sort of smart-ass. I'm playful and hostile." With his wife Nancy Spero still by his side, the documentary captures the final steps of an artist's journey.

Produced by Kartemquin Films and directed by Jerry Blumenthal and Gordon Quinn, Golub (1988) was the winner of the Silver Hugo Award at the 1988 Chicago International Film Festival. The film went on to be an Official Selection at multiple international film festivals including the Cinematica of Portugal and the Sydney International Film Festival. In a February 1989 review of Golub, the Chicago Reader's Jonathan Rosenbaum hailed the documentary as a "masterpiece" and "virtually perfect". The film made its television premiere on PBS's POV in 1990. Golub: Late Works Are The Catastrophes would also receive worldwide recognition as an Official Selection at the 2004 International Documentary Festival Amsterdam as well as the Montreal International Film Festival of the Arts.

In 2006, Kartemquin Films released Golub/Spero a DVD compilation of Golub: Late Works Are The Catastrophes that also features two documentary shorts created by filmmaker, Irene Sosa, that highlight the work of Nancy Spero.
