= Almost There (film) =

- Directed by: Aaron Wickenden; Dan Rybicky
- Written by: Dan Rybicky
- Produced by: Aaron Wickenden; Dan Rybicky
- Cinematography: Aaron Wickeden
- Edited by: Aaron Wickenden
- Release date: November 17, 2014 (DOC NYC)
- Running time: 93 minutes
- Country: United States
- Language: English

Almost There is a 2014 independent documentary film, produced by Kartemquin Films. It was directed by Aaron Wickenden and Dan Rybicky.

The film delivered a Central Pitch at the 2013 International Documentary Film Festival Amsterdam Forum. It later premiered at DOC NYC and Sheffield Doc/Fest, followed by Official Selections at film festivals around the world. It has received coverage in The New York Times, Chicago Tribune, The Village Voice, and many other outlets.

Almost There was nominated for the 2016 Cinema Eye Honors Spotlight Award. It was acquired for distribution by Factory 25.

== Synopsis ==
Almost There follows elderly outsider artist Peter Anton. It explores how his life changes dramatically after he is discovered by filmmakers Wickenden and Rybicky and puts on his first art exhibition, the fallout from which forces him to leave his deteriorating childhood home.
