= At the Death House Door =

- Directed by: Steve James; Peter Gilbert
- Produced by: Peter Gilbert; Steve James
- Starring: Carroll Pickett
- Cinematography: Peter Gilbert
- Edited by: Steve James; Aaron Wickenden
- Music by: Leo Sidran
- Distributed by: IFC
- Release date: May 2008
- Running time: 98 minutes
- Country: United States
- Language: English

At the Death House Door is a 2008 documentary film about Carroll Pickett, who served as the death house chaplain to the infamous "Walls" prison unit in Huntsville, Texas. It was produced and directed by the team of Steve James and Peter Gilbert, co-produced by Zak Piper and Aaron Wickenden. James and Gilbert had previously worked together on the well-received Kartemquin Films documentary Hoop Dreams, on which James was the producer and director and Gilbert served as producer and director of photography. The film was produced by Kartemquin Films in association with the Chicago Tribune, which provided partial funding.

== Synopsis ==
Pickett presided over 95 executions in his 15-year career, including the very first by lethal injection. He kept his feelings about his work from his family, instead audiotaping an account of each one. Initially pro-execution, he became an anti-death penalty activist.

Pickett was most affected by the execution of Carlos DeLuna in 1989. He firmly believed in DeLuna's innocence. In 2006, Chicago Tribune reporters Maurice Possley and Steve Mills published a detailed investigation suggesting that another man, Carlos Hernández, had committed the crime for which DeLuna was executed, and the film recounts the evidence brought forth in that investigation.
