= Nice Bombs =

- Directed by: Usama Alshaibi
- Produced by: Kristie Alshaibi; Ben Berkowitz; Ben Redgrave
- Starring: Usama Alshaibi; Kristie Alshaibi
- Edited by: Usama Alshaibi; Amy Cargill; Michael Palmerio
- Distributed by: 7th Art Releasing
- Release date: August 17, 2006 (Chicago Underground Film Festival)
- Running time: 76 minutes
- Country: United States
- Language: English

Nice Bombs is a 2006 documentary film directed by Iraqi-American filmmaker Usama Alshaibi about his return to his home country to visit his family after the 2003 invasion of Iraq. The film is co-produced by Kristie Alshaibi and co-executive produced by Studs Terkel.

== Plot ==
In January 2004, shortly after officially becoming an American citizen, the Iraqi-born filmmaker Usama Alshaibi travels to Baghdad to visit the family he hasn't seen in over two decades. He makes the trip with his wife, Kristie, in tow.

Although Saddam Hussein had been captured by American forces in December, Baghdad is in a state of extreme turmoil with massive explosions a daily, frightening occurrence. Yet, Usama and Kristie are surprised by his family's nonchalance at the chaos. When a bomb blows up and rocks the entire house, Usama's cousin Tareef refers to the explosive device as a "nice bomb," hence the film's title.

== Release ==
Nice Bombs made its World Premiere at the 2006 Chicago Underground Film Festival where it won the Best Documentary award, which was especially fitting since Alshaibi has worked as a filmmaker primarily out of Chicago. Nice Bombs was theatrically released in New York at Two Boots Pioneer Theater and in Chicago at the Gene Siskel Film Center. The film was also screened at the 2007 New York Underground Film Festival and made its broadcast debut on the Sundance Channel in March 2008. MVD Entertainment Group currently distributes Nice Bombs on DVD.
