= Home for Life =

- Directed by: Gerald Temaner; Gordon Quinn
- Produced by: Gerald Temaner; Gordon Quinn
- Distributed by: Kartemquin Films
- Release date: 1967
- Running time: 80 minutes
- Country: United States

Home for Life, the founding documentary of Kartemquin Films released in 1967, depicts the experiences of two elderly people in their first month at a home for the aged. One is a woman whose struggle to remain useful in her son and daughter-in-law's home is no longer appreciated. The other is a widower, without a family, who suddenly realizes he can no longer take care of himself. The film offers an unblinking look at the feelings of the two new residents in their encounters with other residents, medical staff, social workers, psychiatrists and family.

Winning the Chicago Award at the Chicago International Film Festival, as well as being an Official Selection at both the New York Film Festival and Edinburgh Film Festival, Kartemquin recently restored Home for Life and made their landmark film available to own on DVD.

== See also ==
- List of American films of 1967
