= Unbroken Glass =

- Directed by: Dinesh Das Sabu
- Produced by: Dinesh Das Sabu; R. Patrick Lile
- Cinematography: Ian Robertson Kibbe; Dinesh Das Sabu
- Edited by: Matt Lauterbach
- Music by: Joshua Abrams
- Production company: Kartemquin Films
- Release date: 2016
- Running time: 57 minutes
- Country: United States
- Language: English

Unbroken Glass is a 2016 independent documentary film, directed by Dinesh Das Sabu and produced by Kartemquin Films. Unbroken Glass weaves together Das Sabu's journey of discovery with cinéma vérité scenes of his family dealing with still raw emotions and consequences of his immigrant parents’ lives and deaths. The film was shot over five years in Illinois, New Mexico, California, and India.

The film premiered at the 2016 Seattle South Asian Film Festival on October 22, 2016, and has gone on to play at the 2016 Dallas Video Fest, the 2016 Driftless Film Festival, and the 2016 Austin Asian American Film Festival where it went on to get a Jury Award-Special Mention for Documentary Feature.

The film received funding from the Sage Foundation, Firelight Media, the Asian Giving Circle, City of Chicago Department of Cultural Affairs and Special Events, and the Illinois Arts Council.

== Synopsis ==
When he was six years old, Dinesh Das Sabu's parents died. Raised by his older siblings, he had little idea who his parents were or where he came from. Through making Unbroken Glass, he attempts to piece together their story and his own. Uncovering a silenced family history and disturbing truths, Dinesh and his siblings must finally reconcile the past, confronting the trauma of losing their parents and the specter of mental illness.

Unbroken Glass weaves together Das Sabu's journey of discovery with cinema-verite scenes of his family dealing with still raw emotions and consequences of his immigrant parents’ lives and deaths.

== Reception ==
The film has received a positive response from members of the mental health and the South Asian community.

- The Jury of the Austin Asian American Film Festival gave a special mention for the Documentary Feature category "for its great courage and grace documenting a very difficult family history while demonstrating resilience of an Asian American family.”
- Nick Allen of RogerEbert.com gave the film a positive review and said the film was "a promising directorial debut" and went on to compare it to Sarah Polley's Stories We Tell: "Sabu harnesses his intense family story...into an intimate, emotionally intricate narrative...His journey is a fascinating look into how we are caught between influences of our past and present, especially within the life-changing bond of family."
- Matt Kubinski of the Cinemajaw podcast gave the film a perfect review: “Like a mosaic, Unbroken Glass takes the broken pieces of an unspoken family tragedy and reassembles them into a new and moving work of art. Deeply personal, yet amazingly universal.”
- Milos Stehlik, co-founder of Facets Multi-Media on an interview with Dinesh on WBEZ said that “Unbroken Glass is a very interesting first feature...a very revelatory journey because it’s a journey of discovery in which the filmmaker discovers himself.”
- Diane Zell, co-leader of the National Alliance on Mental Illness Champaign chapter said that “In Unbroken Glass, tragically broken bonds result in a beautiful family mosaic of courage, strength, resilience, and hope. You will be changed by experiencing it.”
