= Joseph DeLee =

American physician

- Born: Joseph Bolivar DeLee; October 28, 1869; Cold Spring, New York, US
- Died: April 2, 1942 (aged 72); Chicago, Illinois, US
- Resting place: Rosehill Cemetery
- Known for: Chicago Lying-in Hospital
- Scientific career
- Fields: Obstetrics

Signature
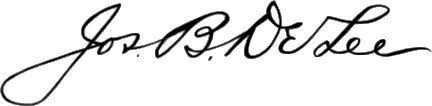

Joseph Bolivar DeLee (October 28, 1869 – April 2, 1942) was an American physician who became known as the father of modern obstetrics. DeLee founded the Chicago Lying-in Hospital, where he introduced the first portable infant incubator. Early in his career, he was associated with the medical school at Northwestern University. After 1929, he was employed by the medical school at the University of Chicago.

An early proponent of hygienic standards during childbirth, DeLee even advocated for the construction of separate hospital buildings for labor and delivery. He was an influential figure in the discussion of whether childbirth required medical interventions to ensure a healthy mother and baby; in 1920, he proposed a standardized, invasive approach to childbirth known as the "prophylactic forceps operation". DeLee believed that mechanical intervention (such as forceps delivery) could prevent the poor outcomes that sometimes resulted from childbirth in the late nineteenth and early twentieth centuries. His advocacy of such active techniques is sometimes blamed for the rise in mechanical interventions during childbirth.

DeLee pioneered medical filmmaking as a teaching tool in medicine and he invented a device used for several decades to suction the airways of newly born infants. After becoming an emeritus professor at the University of Chicago in 1935, DeLee was featured on a Time magazine cover the next year. He died in 1942, but his systematic approach to childbirth continued to influence medical practice through the baby boom. An endowed chair in DeLee's name was established at the University of Chicago a few years after he died.

== Early life and education ==
DeLee was the fifth son and ninth of ten children of Morris and Dora Tobias DeLee, Jewish immigrants from Poland. His paternal grandfather was a French army surgeon who settled in Poland following Napoleon's failed invasion of Russia. DeLee was born in Cold Spring, New York, but the family moved to New Haven, Connecticut, New York City, and finally, in 1885, Chicago, Illinois, where DeLee graduated from South Division High School in 1888.

Despite his father's wishes that DeLee become a rabbi, DeLee attended Chicago Medical College. Of particular influence on DeLee was obstetrics professor W. W. Jaggard. He graduated in 1891. Author Charlotte Borst noted that most women delivered at home in the 1870s through 1890s; medical students at Northwestern only witnessed deliveries at that time if they could bribe women into having their babies at the hospital's amphitheatre. DeLee felt fortunate to have observed two such births while he was a student.

== Early career ==
After completing an internship and a trip abroad for postgraduate studies, DeLee was ready to set up a medical practice by the age of 25. Noting that obstetric care in Chicago was often inadequate, he opened a clinic on Chicago's Maxwell Street after consulting with the noted social worker Jane Addams. Early on, DeLee provided prenatal care to the neighborhood's women, but the babies were delivered by midwives in the area. Over time, hundreds of women began having their babies delivered by DeLee.

DeLee opened Chicago Lying-in Hospital in 1899. The hospital provided a larger space than the Maxwell Street Clinic and it focused on providing obstetrical care and training of doctors and nurses. Sanfilippo and Uppal write that, after he paid the first month's rent at the new Ashland Boulevard facility and purchased the necessary equipment, DeLee was left with sixty-one cents to his name. In late 1899, the Chicago Tribune described one of the hospital's innovations, the first portable incubator. The device, which was sometimes known as a "hand ambulance", allowed premature infants to be transported to a hospital following a home birth.

Though he was an obstetrician rather than a pediatrician, DeLee became the greatest advocate of the infant incubator in the U.S. At that time, obstetricians dealt with the problems of the premature baby after birth, where pediatricians were likely to only see the survivors of prematurity many days later. The pediatricians – influenced by their experiences taking care of other types of malnourished children – thought it was essential for the babies to be exposed to sunlight. For most pediatricians, it seemed counterintuitive to enclose the babies in a box. By 1901, DeLee had built an entire incubator transport service staffed with specially trained nurses, but costs were high and maternity hospitals still did not attract many private patients. The funds ran out on the incubator station in 1908.

== Introduction of "prophylactic forceps" ==
In the early twentieth century, DeLee observed that obstetric complications and deaths were so common that he "often wondered whether nature did not intend women should be used up in the process of reproduction, in a manner analogous to that of the salmon, which dies after spawning. Perhaps laceration, prolapse and all the evils are, in fact, natural to labor and in fact normal... If you adopt this view, I have no ground to stand on, but, if you believe that a woman after delivery should be as healthy, as well as anatomically perfect as she was before, and that the child should be undamaged, then you will have to agree with me that labor is pathogenic, because experience has proved such ideal results exceedingly rare."

In 1915, at the annual meeting of the American Association for the Study and Prevention of Infant Mortality, DeLee spoke out against the use of midwives for childbirth. DeLee said that midwives stunted the progress of the obstetrical profession and said that he refused to take part in the education of a provider that lowered the standards of the profession. If obstetrics were seen as dignified work that could draw more than the menial fees charged by midwives, DeLee said, many young physicians would be willing to deliver the patients that were then under the care of midwives.

At a meeting of the American Gynecological Society in 1920, DeLee sparked controversy when he presented a paper advocating for the use of a systematic approach to childbirth for physicians, including the use of forceps and episiotomy even in women who had no labor complications. DeLee's "prophylactic forceps operation" consisted of several steps: scopolamine injections in the first stage of labor, ether anesthesia in the next stage, then episiotomy and forceps delivery. Ergot was used in the subsequent manual extraction of the placenta. DeLee reasoned that the episiotomy prevented perineal tears which could cause complications like uterine prolapse and vesicovaginal fistula. He said that the early use of forceps would avoid pressure from the pelvic bones against a baby's head, thus preventing complications like epilepsy and cerebral palsy; DeLee said that fatal complications occurred in 4–5% of labors managed with the traditional conservative approach. Though DeLee said that such interventions should only be carried out by a well-equipped physician specialist, John Whitridge Williams and other prominent obstetricians criticized DeLee sharply. They felt that DeLee was being too aggressive by removing a baby before complications occurred; DeLee's colleagues preferred to be conservative and to manage complications as they arose.

== Growing influence ==
Well into the 20th century, many physicians had looked at obstetrics as an unnecessary medical specialty. As a result, medical schools did not cover childbirth in much detail, and medical students might graduate without having even witnessed the delivery of a baby. Distressed by this lack of attention, DeLee made teaching and mentoring important parts of his career. With a maternal mortality rate about one-quarter of the national average, DeLee's Chicago Lying-In Hospital became well-respected and influential, and medical students would travel across the country to gain some experience there. A young woman named Beatrice Edna Tucker came to Lying-In to complete her residency in 1929. Three years later, DeLee named Tucker director of the Chicago Maternity Center, where she worked for more than forty years and delivered an estimated 100,000 babies.

David Hillis, one of DeLee's colleagues at the Chicago Lying-in Hospital, published a 1917 journal article about his invention of the fetoscope, also known as the head stethoscope. By 1922, DeLee published a report of a similar device. Though DeLee published his findings several years after Hillis, he claimed that he had been openly discussing his idea for the device over many years. The device became known as the DeLee-Hillis stethoscope. DeLee was also the inventor of a catheter used to suction an infant's airway; the DeLee suction trap is still used after the delivery of a baby. He was one of the earliest physicians to advocate for the lower segment cesarean section.

Despite the initial resistance DeLee faced from his colleagues over his standardized, invasive approach to delivery, forceps began to appear in routine obstetric practice in the 1930s. Social forces increased DeLee's influence and accelerated the use of mechanical interventions in childbirth. As childbirth was still beset with problems such as childbed fever, physicians were asserting their superiority over non-physician birth attendants, and mechanical interventions in obstetrics set their profession apart from midwifery. In an age of increasing reliance on technology, urban women were increasingly likely to choose a hospital birth attended by a physician rather than a traditional home birth with a midwife.

In 1933, DeLee noted that while hospital births were increasingly popular, maternal complications and deaths were increasing. He identified infection as a major problem in hospital maternity wards. DeLee called for hospitals to construct maternity wards in separate buildings with their own staff members and laundry. Such proposals were met with great criticism by influential physicians such as J. Whitridge Williams, who said that DeLee's precautions represented "a degree of caution that approaches 'infectio-phobia'." He was the first physician to call for the use of face masks in midwifery practice.

When DeLee's critics cited the costs of his proposals such as separate buildings and maternity staffs, DeLee replied, "Nothing compares in value with human life." Despite his concerns about infections, he believed that the hospital was the best place for a birth to be supervised. In a letter to journalist Paul de Kruif, DeLee even wrote that he was "perfectly willing to repeat that general hospitals are cesspools of infections, but only in a medical journal." He did not want such stories appearing in the popular press, as these reports might frighten women.

DeLee was one of the pioneers of filmmaking for the purpose of medical teaching. He authored a paper in the mid-1930s, Sound Motion Pictures in Obstetrics, which described the necessary components of a medical film, including scripts, props, lighting, sound and expert staff members.

== Later life and legacy ==
DeLee was employed with Northwestern University until 1929, when he aligned with the University of Chicago. DeLee authored several editions of Principles and Practice of Obstetrics, which was described as "unequalled in text and illustration." DeLee created Our Baby's First Seven Years, a book that parents could use to record the milestones of infancy and childhood. The book also provided child care advice. More than eight million copies of the book had been sold by 1987.

William S. Kroger, who DeLee successfully revived as a newborn in 1906, graduated from medical school in 1930 and served a residency under DeLee in obstetrics, gynecology and neuroendocrinology. Since his childhood, Kroger had been urged by his mother to follow in the footsteps of the doctor who had saved his life. Kroger became a well-known authority on the use of hypnosis in obstetrics and other medical specialties.

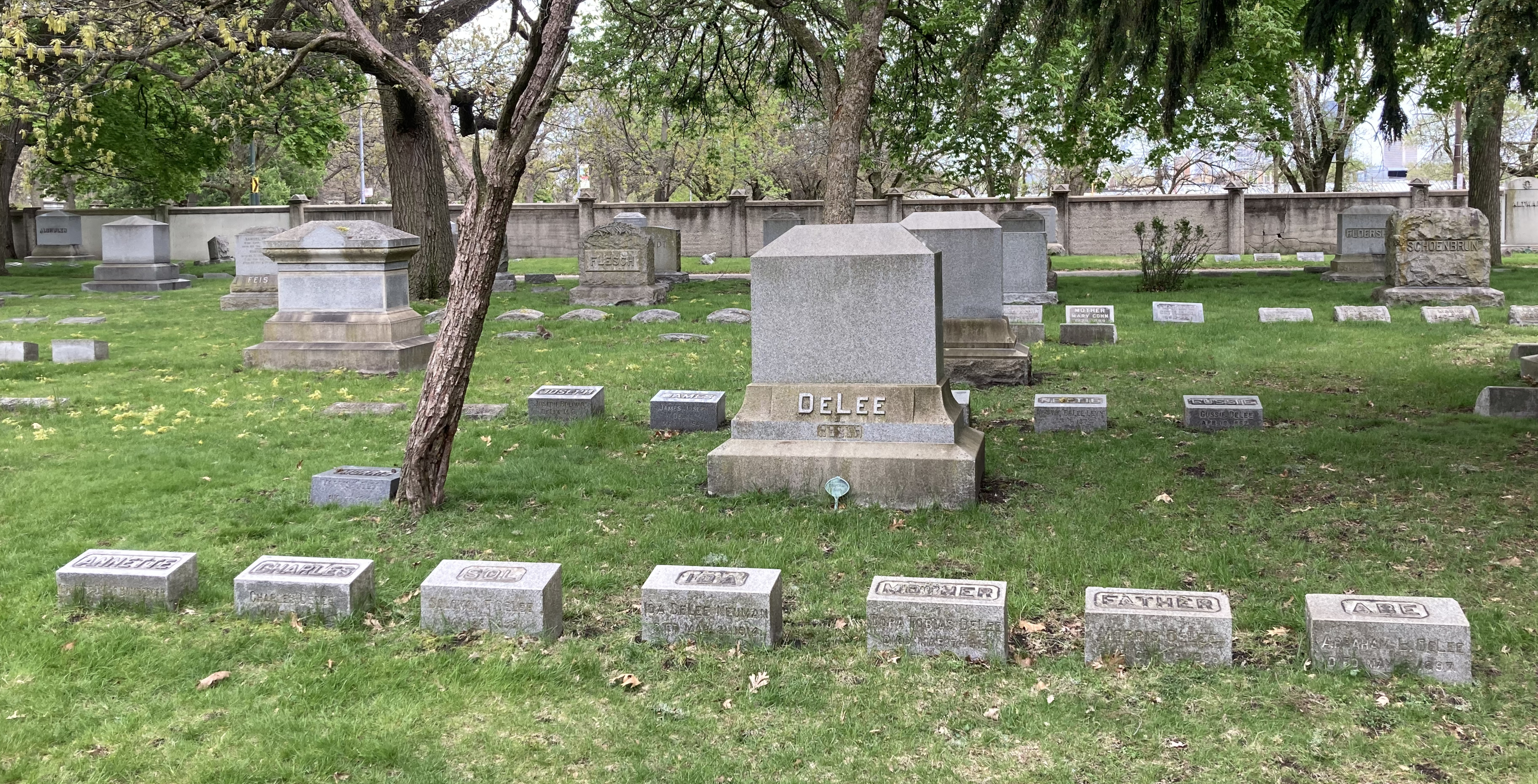
DeLee's grave at Rosehill Cemetery

In 1934, the University of Chicago recognized DeLee with its Rosenberger Medal, which is awarded for excellence in research, invention, authorship or other distinctions that benefit humanity. DeLee became an emeritus professor at the University of Chicago in 1935. In May 1936, DeLee appeared on the cover of Time magazine. He died at his Chicago home in April 1942, and was buried at Rosehill Cemetery. DeLee never married and he was said to have lived constantly at the hospital. Author Harold Speert wrote, "Despite his wide professional acclaim, DeLee remained a lonely unhappy man, plagued by excessive sensitivity and by the compulsive tendencies of the perfectionist he was."

In 1948, a mothers aid group from the Chicago Maternity Center raised $30,000 to endow a professorship in obstetrics in DeLee's name at the University of Chicago. The board of directors for the Chicago Lying-in Hospital awards the Joseph Bolivar DeLee Humanitarian Award annually to an individual who has made significant contributions to the care of women and children. DeLee's nephew, Sol DeLee, was a Las Vegas obstetrician who wrote several editions of the book Safeguarding Motherhood from the 1940s to 1980s.

During the baby boom, DeLee's prophylactic forceps approach found new life. Busy physicians were often eager to adopt this systematic approach to anesthetized delivery because its efficiency allowed them to care for more patients. By 1968, nearly 40% of the babies born in U.S. hospitals were delivered with forceps. The use of episiotomies also continued to increase throughout DeLee's career and after his death. By the 1970s, 90% of delivering women received an episiotomy. A 1983 study did not support good outcomes with this practice, and by the year 2000, only 20 percent of U.S. deliveries involved an episiotomy.

DeLee has been remembered in published literature as one of two "titans of modern obstetrics". He has been credited with making important advancements in obstetrical care, and he has been criticized for encouraging the liberal use of medications and surgical procedures during childbirth – interventions that carried their own risks – even in cases where childbirth could have proceeded uneventfully.
