= African Conservation Centre =

Kenyan non-governmental organization

The African Conservation Centre (ACC) is a non-governmental organization based in Kenya. The group was founded in 1995. In 2007, it received a US$200,000 grant from the Ford Foundation. Their work has focused on capacity building "to conserve wildlife through sound science, local initiatives and good governance." One of its projects, the Shompole Group Ranch.", won the 2006 Equator Initiative Award for community-driven biodiversity-based business from the United Nations Development Programme.

== Values ==
According to the ACC's website, the organization's main goal is to protect East African biodiversity by implementing conservation solutions using skills and knowledge of both local communities and scientists. The website also stresses the importance of these solutions accounting for the needs of indigenous people as well as the diverse environment which the ACC seeks to conserve.

== Vision ==
Conservation of life's diversity for the well-being of the community and the environment "

== Mission ==
The mission is to conserve the wildlife and the environment in and beyond East Africa through the application of scientific and indigenous knowledge, enhanced livelihood and development of effective institutions."

== History ==
African Conservation Center (ACC) began in the 1970s. Initially, it began as a research field for the issue of conserving wildlife. In 1995, ACC was registered " as a nonprofit organization. Since then, the organization has grown to many accomplishments. In 2012, ACC collaborated with the South Rift Association of Landowners to create Kenya Rangeland Coalition.
