= In the Family (2008 film) =

- Directed by: Joanna Rudnick
- Produced by: Joanna Rudnick; Gordon Quinn; Beth Iams
- Cinematography: Cynthia Wade
- Edited by: Leslie Simmer
- Music by: Erin O'Hara
- Distributed by: Kartemquin Films
- Release date: February 2008
- Running time: 83 minutes
- Country: United States
- Language: English

In the Family is a 2008 documentary film, produced by Kartemquin Films, about predicting breast and ovarian cancer and the choices women make when they are faced with the dangers of a possible life-threatening disease. The film's director, Joanna Rudnick, tests positive for the familial BRCA mutation that increases her chances of developing breast cancer by 60%. Faced with these odds, Rudnick must examine her choices of possibly taking her chances or possibly having her breasts and ovaries removed.

In the Family takes a look at genetic testing, something that was an impossibility to previous generations, but for some women, the decision to be tested is not easy. Rudnick follows several women going through the decision to be tested, some who are cancer survivors and some that are losing that battle. The question for each woman is, "how much do you sacrifice to survive?"

Produced by Kartemquin Films, In the Family premiered on PBS's P.O.V. on October 1, 2008. It was nominated for an Emmy Award for Outstanding Informational Long Form Programming in 2009.

In May 2009, director Joanna Rudnick contributed to the Huffington Post supporting a lawsuit made by the ACLU challenging the patent ownership of the BRCA1 and BRCA2 genes - the genes responsible for ovarian and breast cancer. Because of their patent control, Myriad Genetics, were being accused of limiting scientific breakthroughs that may lead to better prevention or treatment of ovarian and breast cancer. Parts of the company's patents on the BRCA1 and BRCA2 genes were ruled invalid on March 29, 2010 by Judge Robert W. Sweet in the U.S. District Court for the Southern District of New York. Myriad filed a notice of appeal on June 16, 2010 in the United States Court of Appeals for the Federal Circuit.
