= Steve James (film producer) =

American film producer and documentary film director

- Born: March 8, 1955 (age 71); Hampton, Virginia, U.S.
- Education: James Madison University; Southern Illinois University Carbondale
- Occupations: Film director, producer
- Years active: 1986–present
- Spouse: Judy James

Steve James (born March 8, 1955) is an American film producer and director of several documentaries, including Hoop Dreams (1994), Stevie (2002), The Interrupters (2011), Life Itself (2014), and Abacus: Small Enough to Jail (2016).

== Early life ==
James was born in Hampton, Virginia. He is a graduate of James Madison University.

== Career ==
James' career began with the release in 1994 of the award-winning documentary, Hoop Dreams. In 1997, James directed the feature film Prefontaine followed by the TV movies Passing Glory and Joe and Max. His next documentary film Stevie was released in 2002. The Interrupters, a portrayal of a year inside the lives of former gang members in Chicago who now intervene in violent conflicts, was released in 2011 after premiering at the Sundance Film Festival. The film was his sixth feature length collaboration with his long-time filmmaking home, the non-profit Chicago production studio Kartemquin Films. To date, James has had nine films or docuseries premiere at the Sundance Film Festival.

In 2016, James directed Abacus: Small Enough to Jail, which premiered at the Toronto Film Festival and went on to be nominated for an Academy Award, James' second nomination.

Much of James' work is centered in the Chicago area. Besides Hoop Dreams, such works include the film Life Itself on the life of film critic Roger Ebert, and the docuseries, The New Americans, America to Me, and City So Real. James has directed several other documentaries focusing on sports, among them ESPN 30 for 30 films No Crossover: The Trial of Allen Iverson and The Luckiest Guy in the World, a biography of legendary basketball player Bill Walton.

== Influences ==
In an interview with journalist Robert K. Elder for The Film That Changed My Life, James has stated his work was strongly influenced by the film Harlan County, USA:

There've been many documentaries over the years that have powerfully impacted me. I think this one came along at the time when I was more interested in being a feature filmmaker than a documentary filmmaker. So it came along at the beginning of a process of moving from an interest in feature film to documentaries, and that's where my career has taken me. It came along at the right time for me. It helped me see, "Ah, this is more what I want to do."

James pulls influence from the original definition of the term cinéma vérité as it applies to the Rouch/Morin method of filmmaking. As with Rouch and Morin, the "people on camera and we in the audience are continually reminded that a film is being made, that we are watching a film." We are reminded through James' presence on screen as well as his cinematic editing techniques, in order to obtain what he believes is a more accurate depiction of truth.

He also was influenced by Robert Altman's 1975 film Nashville.

== Filmography ==
- Stop Substance Abuse, 1986
- Grassroots Chicago, 1991 (with Kartemquin Films)
- Higher Goals, 1993 (with Kartemquin Films)
- Hoop Dreams, 1994 (with Kartemquin Films)
- Prefontaine, 1997
- Passing Glory, 1999 (TV)
- Joe and Max, 2002 (TV)
- Stevie, 2002 (with Kartemquin Films)
- The New Americans, 2004 (executive producer, Nigerian story director) (with Kartemquin Films)
- Reel Paradise, 2005
- The War Tapes, 2006 (producer)
- At the Death House Door, 2008 (with Kartemquin Films)
- No Crossover: The Trial of Allen Iverson, 2010 (ESPN 30 for 30 film) (with Kartemquin Films)
- The Interrupters, 2011 (with Kartemquin Films)
- Head Games, 2012
- Life Itself, 2014 (with Kartemquin Films)
- Lucky, 2014
- Abacus: Small Enough to Jail, 2016 (with Kartemquin Films)
- America to Me, 2018 (with Kartemquin Films)
- City So Real, 2020
- A Compassionate Spy, 2022 (with Kartemquin Films)
- The Luckiest Guy in the World, 2023 (ESPN 30 for 30 docuseries)
