= 5 Girls =

2001 film by Maria Finitzo

- Directed by: Maria Finitzo
- Produced by: Maria Finitzo; David E. Simpson; Gordon Quinn (Executive Producer); Jerry Blumenthal (Co-Executive Producer)
- Cinematography: Dana Kupper
- Edited by: David E. Simpson
- Distributed by: Kartemquin Films
- Release date: 2001
- Running time: 120 minutes
- Country: United States
- Language: English

5 Girls is a documentary released in 2001 by Kartemquin Films for PBS's P.O.V. series. The film follows five young women between the ages of 13 and 17.

Directed by Maria Finitzo, 5 Girls made its television premiere on PBS's P.O.V. on October 2, 2001.

At the time of the film's release, The New York Times praised 5 Girls for its "intimacy and candor". Reminiscent of Michael Apted's classic Up! series, the film unfolds into a bold "sociological portrait" showing the transformation of each girl into a woman. In 2002, 5 Girls was awarded the Henry Hampton Award for Excellence in Film & Digital Media from the Council on Foundations. The film also took home The Silver Award from the Chicago Film & Television Competition.

In September 2007, Kartemquin Films released 5 Girls on DVD.
