= In the Game =

- Directed by: Maria Finitzo
- Produced by: Maria Finitzo, Mary Morrissette
- Cinematography: Peter Gilbert, Dana Kupper, Ines Sommer
- Edited by: Katarina Simic, Leslie Simmer, Liz Kaar
- Release date: July 9, 2015 (Madrid International Film Festival)
- Country: United States
- Language: English

In the Game is a 2015 documentary film directed by Peabody award-winner Maria Finitzo that follows the ups and downs of a girls’ soccer team. Set in a predominantly Hispanic neighborhood, the film chronicles the obstacles that struggling low-income families and students must face in their quest for higher education.

Elizabeth, captain of the girls soccer team, stresses going beyond what is expected of her teammates on and off the field. Many of the girls are juggling the pressures to get good grades, perform well for their soccer team, and help their families out financially by working. Kelly High School on Chicago’s south side is an inner city public school struggling to provide the basics for their students because of a lack of resources and funding with the school experiencing $4 million budget cuts. Many students of Kelly High School do not make it to college, either because they cannot compete academically or because their families do not have the financial resources to send them to college. The girls face an uneven playing field - or in the case of the girls at Kelly High School, no soccer field at all - little or no support, problems at home, uncertain futures, racial discrimination, and poverty, but remain driven and hopeful thanks to their teammates and the dedicated mentoring of their coach.
