= The Trials of Muhammad Ali =

2013 American documentary film

- Promotional release poster
- Directed by: Bill Siegel
- Produced by: Leon Gast; Justine Nagan; Rachel Pikelny; Gordon Quinn; Kat White
- Starring: Muhammad Ali; Louis Farrakhan; Robert Lipsyte
- Cinematography: Andrew Black
- Edited by: Aaron Wickenden
- Music by: Joshua Abrams
- Production company: Kartemquin Films
- Distributed by: Kino Lorber
- Release date: May 5, 2013 (United States)
- Running time: 86 minutes
- Country: United States
- Language: English
- Box office: $57,579

The Trials of Muhammad Ali is a 2013 American documentary film about the heyday of boxer Muhammad Ali's career, with special focus on his conversion to Islam and his refusal to fight in the Vietnam War. It won an award for Best Use of News Footage from the International Documentary Association in 2014.

== Cast ==
Interviewees:

- Louis Farrakhan
- Robert Lipsyte
- John Carlos
- Angelo Dundee

Archive footage:

- Muhammad Ali
- George W. Bush
- David Susskind
- Lyndon Johnson
- Jerry Lewis
- Malcolm X
- Martin Luther King Jr.
- Elijah Muhammad

== Reception ==
On the review aggregator website Rotten Tomatoes, the film has an approval rating of 88% based on 42 reviews, with an average rating of 7.5/10. The website's consensus reads, "Director Bill Siegel doesn't explore any new boundaries of the documentary with The Trials of Muhammad Ali, but his subject is so inherently fascinating that the movie proves gripping in spite of its familiar beats."
