= American Arab (film) =

2013 film by Usama Alshaibi

- Directed by: Usama Alshaibi
- Release date: 2013
- Country: United States
- Language: English

American Arab is a 2013 documentary film by Iraqi-American filmmaker Usama Alshaibi.

== Summary ==
The film follows the personal story of Alshaibi's life in post-9/11 United States and concentrates on sensitive issues pertaining to race and identity. The perceptions and misconceptions of the Arab American community are closely analyzed and deconstructed over the course of the film to reveal a more complex culture of individuals rather than a singularly stigmatized group of people. Alshaibi himself was the victim of a hate crime in 2011 so the film therein tackles the subject of racism and oppression towards Arab Americans in today's society.

== Production ==
American Arab is a production of Kartemquin Films, and is part of their Diversity Fellowship program.
