= Finding Hillywood =

- Produced by: Chris Towey, Leah Warshawski
- Release date: 2013
- Running time: 57 mins

Finding Hillywood is a 2013 documentary film which examines the budding film industry in Rwanda (now popularly known as Hillywood).

== Synopsis ==
The film introduces viewers to the very beginning of Rwanda’s film industry, key members of Hillywood like Ayuub Kasasa Mago, and Eric Kabera. alongside its impact on Rwandans.

== Awards ==
- Best Documentary, Rainier Independent Film Fest (2014)
- Audience Award, Napa Film Festival (2013)
- Critic’s Award at Sebastopol Documentary Festival
- Best Pacific Northwest Film, Eugene International Film Fest (2013)
- Best Mid-Length Doc, Montreal Black Film Fest (2013)
- 3rd Prize, Afghanistan Human Rights Festival (2013)

== Festivals ==
- 2013: Seattle International Film Festival
- 2013: Bahamas International Film Festival
- 2014: FilmAid Film Festival
