= Profane (film) =

Profane is a 2011 American art film directed by Usama Alshaibi. The film won "2011 Best of Fest Feature" of Boston Underground Film Festival.

== Cast ==
- Manal Kara as Muna
- Molly Plunk as Mary
- Dejan Mircea as Ali
- Other appearances (alphabetically): Jessica Bailey, Golbon Eghtedari, Kiel Frieden, Kiel Frieder, Bret Koontz, Nigel Murphy, Celina Paddock, Edward Salem, Stephan Wozniak
