= Terra Incognita: The Perils and Promise of Stem Cell Research =

- Directed by: Maria Finitzo
- Produced by: Gordon Quinn; Justine Nagan
- Cinematography: Jim Morrissette; Ines Sommer
- Edited by: Michael O'Brien; David E. Simpson; Jan Sutcliffe
- Music by: Joel Diamond
- Distributed by: Kartemquin Films
- Release date: October 2007 (Chicago)
- Country: United States
- Language: English

Terra Incognita: The Perils and Promise of Stem Cell Research, also known as Terra Incognita: Mapping Stem Cell Research, is a documentary film released by Kartemquin Films in 2007. The film follows Dr. Jack Kessler of Northwestern University in his search for a cure for spinal cord injuries using embryonic stem cells. When Kessler was invited to head up the Neurology Department at Northwestern, his focus was on using stem cells to help cure diabetes. However, soon after his move to Chicago, his daughter Allison – then age 15, was injured in a skiing accident and paralyzed from the waist down. In the moments following the accident, Dr. Kessler made the decision to change the focus of his research to begin looking for a cure for spinal cord injuries using embryonic stem cells.

Kessler's story brings the stem cell debate to the public for discussion. The film follows the constantly evolving interplay between the promise of new discoveries, the controversy of modern science and the resilience and courage of people living every day with devastating disease and injury.

The film was directed by Maria Finitzo (5 Girls), and was broadcast on PBS' award-winning series Independent Lens in 2008. Terra Incognita won a 2008 Peabody Award recognizing the film's uncompromising look at stem-cell research. The film also won Best Documentary Feature at the 2009 Kos International Health Film Festival in Greece.
