= Edith+Eddie =

2017 documentary film by Laura Checkoway

- Directed by: Laura Checkoway
- Produced by: Laura Checkoway; Thomas Lee Wright
- Edited by: Laura Checkoway; P. Corwin Lamm
- Music by: P. Corwin Lamm
- Production companies: Heart is Red, LLC. Kartemquin Films
- Distributed by: Kartemquin Films; Topic.com (streaming)
- Release date: March 2, 2017 (True/False Film Festival)
- Running time: 29 minutes
- Country: United States
- Language: English

Edith+Eddie is a 2017 American documentary film directed by Laura Checkoway and produced by Thomas Lee Wright. It was distributed by Kartemquin Films. When singer and entertainer Cher learned about the couple from a local news story, she offered to pay for repairs to the couple's home as well as Edith's medical bills. Cher is also the executive producer of the documentary film. It was nominated for the Academy Award for Best Documentary Short Subject at the 90th Academy Awards.

== Background ==
According to Checkoway, the film was originally supposed to be a heartwarming love story about America's oldest interracial newlyweds, aged 96 and 95, who married after ten years together. However, the story took a turn when the happy couple was forcibly separated by a court order, mandating that Edith go live with her daughter in Florida.

When Cher saw a news clip about the couple's plight, she was very moved and wanted to know how she could help. “I called my lawyer and said, ‘Get into this and work on it,’ because I don't want to see this couple separated. They're too fabulous, and I just don't want to see anything bad happen to them. I was going to have to retrofit their house so that they could stay there, which really was making some repairs and putting a full bathroom downstairs. Then things started to change. All of a sudden, they had to renovate the entire house. It was now up in the hundreds of thousands of dollars. And then, while we’re trying to figure this out, one night, [Hill's guardian] comes with the police and drags her out of the house."

She connected with the family and hired a lawyer to represent Edith and Rebecca Wright, one of her three daughters, in order to honor Edith's wishes to stay in her home.

“I took care of my grandmothers, I take care of my mother. It’s very expensive, and thank God I can afford to. But both my grandmothers said to me, “Don’t ever put me in a home.” Then my grandmother put my grandfather in a home; she made it seem like it was nirvana. I went to visit him, and I saw all these people just warehoused in this place. My grandfather didn't speak the whole time I was there. I turned to him and said: 'I am getting you out of here. I don't care what anyone says.' And the only thing he said to me the whole time I was there was, 'Don't delay.' I got him out of there. I wouldn't put anybody in that home. I know that people don't have the funds, but warehousing our parents is just not right.”

Says Checkoway: “[Cher] wasn't seeking publicity; this was just something out of the generosity of who she is. She got involved behind the scenes and then she and I bonded and kept that connection going. It was pretty soon when we found out that there was disagreement between Edith's daughters about what was best for their mom. We did not know what would unfold, literally, until it did.

“The legal guardianship system was not on my radar before making this film, and so we learn that Edith's rights have been put in the hands of someone who is appointed by the court who doesn't know her. And the issues that arise when that happens are something that plays out before us again in the film. Then I began researching, and I couldn't understand how this could be. A lot of audience members leave the film asking, How on earth could this happen? They come to find out that this is happening to elders all across the country.” Reporter Judith Graham of The Washington Post presented more details from the perspective of the other participants in the story.

== Release and awards ==
Edith+Eddie premiered at the True/False Film Festival in 2017, and subsequently screened at 34 more festivals throughout 2017 and 2018. The film won multiple awards including the Best Short at the International Documentary Association Awards, Jury Award for Best Documentary at the Palm Springs International Shortfest, Jury Award for Best Documentary Short at the Hamptons International Film Festival, Best Documentary Short at the Nevada City Film Festival, Outstanding Documentary Short Film at Tallgrass International Film Festival, Best Documentary - Flickers' Youth Film Jury Awards at the Rhode Island International Film Festival, Audience Award for Best Short at the Montclair Film Festival, Semi-Finalist: "Shorts List" at the Cinema Eye Honors, and Jury Honorable Mention - Short Doc Award at the Sheffield Doc/Fest. It was chosen by NBC for its Meet the Press Film Festival and showed on the NBCNews.com website.

== Critical reception ==
Critically, the film has been well received. Lidia Moore of Vox Magazine said the film would "pull at the heartstrings while striking a flame within the audience."

Chuck Todd from Meet the Press called it "a terrific documentary" and Simon Kilmurry, executive director of the International Documentary Association, said the film was distinguished by "unforgettable lead characters" and "sensitive elicitation of universal truths.". Thomas Grimshaw from the London Short Film Festival Programme called it "one of the finest observational documentaries of the year."

In IndieWire, Anne Thompson called the film "a heart-tugger about a biracial elderly couple struggling to stay together." Marilyn Ferdinand from Ferdy on Films said "Edith+Eddie is a cautionary tale for our new era of economic want and callous self-interest." Paul Booth of Talking Pictures raved that Edith and Eddie is "All of the things we look for in a film... challenging, universal... a gift of love and compassion." Matt Turner from Shooting People said the film was "...gripping the viewer for the duration and building something genuinely beautiful out of tragedy."

Norman Wilner of Now Toronto said of the film, "In just half an hour, Edith+Eddie captures so much about love, aging and infirmity–and speak volumes about America's issues with elder care and guardianship." Stephen Saito of the Moveable Feast wrote, "As wrenching as Edith+Eddie becomes, it still resonates most immediately as an intimate portrait of two people whose company you will come to prize as much as they clearly do each other’s..."

Jordan M. Smith of NonFics.com called the film, "Devastating... It is the mix of incredible access and a willingness to embrace a story’s shrewdly synthesized structure, running the gamut from unbelievable fantasy to unbearable nightmare." Steven Zeitchik of the Los Angeles Times said of the film, "...what could have been a life-affirming hug turns into something darker: an indictment of the elder-care system, with racial undertones," and Eric Althoff of The Washington Times said, "A more heartbreaking film might not be seen this weekend [at AFI DOCS]... bring tissues." Additionally, Aarik Danielson of the Columbia Tribune said the film was "capturing the beauty of a pure love unfazed, at least by the people inside it, by race or age."

Executive Producer Cher said of the film, "They were truly in love. What happened to them is horrible – it's elder abuse and it's happening all over. We're hopeful this film can make a difference."

== See also ==
- Health care in the United States
- Elder abuse
- Nursing home
- Aging in place
- Assisted living
- Elder financial abuse
- Parental abuse by children
