= America ReFramed =

American documentary television series

- Genre: Documentary
- Presented by: Natasha Del Toro
- Country of origin: United States
- Original language: English
- No. of seasons: 9
- No. of episodes: 125

Production
- Executive producers: Justine Nagan, Chris White, Christopher Hastings
- Producer: Carmen L. Vicencio
- Production companies: American Documentary, Inc. and World

Original release
- Network: World Channel
- Release: 2012 – present

America ReFramed is an American weekly independent documentary television series broadcast on World Channel. Since 2012, America ReFramed has broadcast over 120 films by independent filmmakers. The series is co-produced by American Documentary, Inc. and the World Channel. America ReFramed films feature personal stories that have a strong social-issue focus.

America ReFramed broadcasts have won several awards including a Peabody Award and Alfred I. duPont-Columbia University Award for broadcast journalism. The series has earned several Christopher, GRACIE, Telly and Cine Golden Eagle Awards, as well as nominations for EMMY, Independent Documentary Association, and Imagen awards.
