= Carlos Hernández (criminal) =

American criminal (1954–1999)

- Born: July 14, 1954; Corpus Christi, Texas, U.S.
- Died: May 6, 1999 (aged 44); Bowie County, Texas, U.S.
- Spouse: Rosenda Anzaludua (m. 1982; div. 1985)
- Children: 1

Carlos Hernández (July 14, 1954 – May 6, 1999) was an American man allegedly responsible for the 1983 murder of Wanda Lopez, for which Carlos DeLuna was executed. Since DeLuna's execution, questions have been raised about his conviction, with many believing him to be innocent.

== Biography ==
Carlos Hernández Jr. was born on July 14, 1954, in Corpus Christi, Texas, the third child of Mexican parents, Fidela Gonzales and Carlos Hernández Sr. Hernández Jr. was raised in a two-bedroom apartment with his five siblings, his parents divorced in 1960 due to his father's conviction of rape. After the divorce, his mother found work at a local laundry in order to support her children.

Following his father's departure from the family home, Carlos and his brother were placed at a local institution for youths, as his mother could not support them. Probation officers noted that Carlos's time spent at the institution negatively impacted him, and at 16 he dropped out of school.

As a juvenile, Hernández was charged with negligent homicide following a car accident. Hernández had been driving the car of his sister's boyfriend and later admitted to drinking alcohol at the time of the accident. Both his sister and her boyfriend were in the car, his sister was injured and her boyfriend was killed. While Hernández was initially charged with excessive speeding and driving while under the influence, he was ultimately placed on probation.

From 1969 to 1996, Hernández was arrested 39 times, 13 of them for carrying a knife.

== Wanda Lopez killing ==
On the evening of February 4, 1983, 24-year-old gas station attendant Wanda Lopez was stabbed multiple times with an 8-inch lock-blade buck knife, causing her to bleed to death. A manhunt ensued and 20-year-old Carlos DeLuna was arrested after being found hiding under a parked truck, close to the crime scene.

At his 1983 trial, DeLuna told the jury that on the day of the murder he had spent time with Hernández and had known him for years. He argued that he witnessed Hernández inside the gas station wrestling with a woman behind the counter. Prosecutors dismissed his claim that Hernández was the true murderer of Wanda Lopez, arguing instead that he was a "phantom" suspect whom Mr DeLuna had fabricated. The chief prosecutor concluded that Hernández was a "figment of DeLuna's imagination". DeLuna was ultimately convicted of murder and sentenced to death. On December 7, 1989, at age 27, DeLuna was executed by lethal injection, despite maintaining his innocence.

After DeLuna's trial, Hernández was said to have frequently admitted to being a knife murderer, confessing numerous times to having killed Wanda Lopez and often joking to friends and relatives that his 'Tocayo' (Spanish for namesake), had taken the fall.

In October 1989, two months before DeLuna's execution, Hernández was sentenced to 10 years imprisonment for the attempted murder of another woman, Diana Ybanez. Hernández had attacked Ybanez with a knife, similar to the knife used to kill Wanda Lopez.

== Subsequent investigations ==
On June 27, 2006, years after the deaths of both DeLuna and Hernández, a Chicago Tribune article identified five people who said that Hernández had admitted to murdering Wanda Lopez, as well as the murder of another woman, Dahlia Sauceda, in 1979, a crime for which he was indicted but never tried.

== Personal life ==
Hernández's son, Jesus Anzaldua was also born in 1980, with Rosenda Anzaludua, whom Hernández would marry in 1982.

Hernández sought a divorce from Anzaludua in 1983, which became final in 1985.

== Death ==
Carlos Hernández died from cirrhosis of the liver in a Texas prison on May 6, 1999, at age 44, having been jailed for attacking a neighbor with a knife.
