= Jeffrey Skoll =

Canadian engineer, internet entrepreneur and film producer (born 1965)

Jeffrey Skoll OC
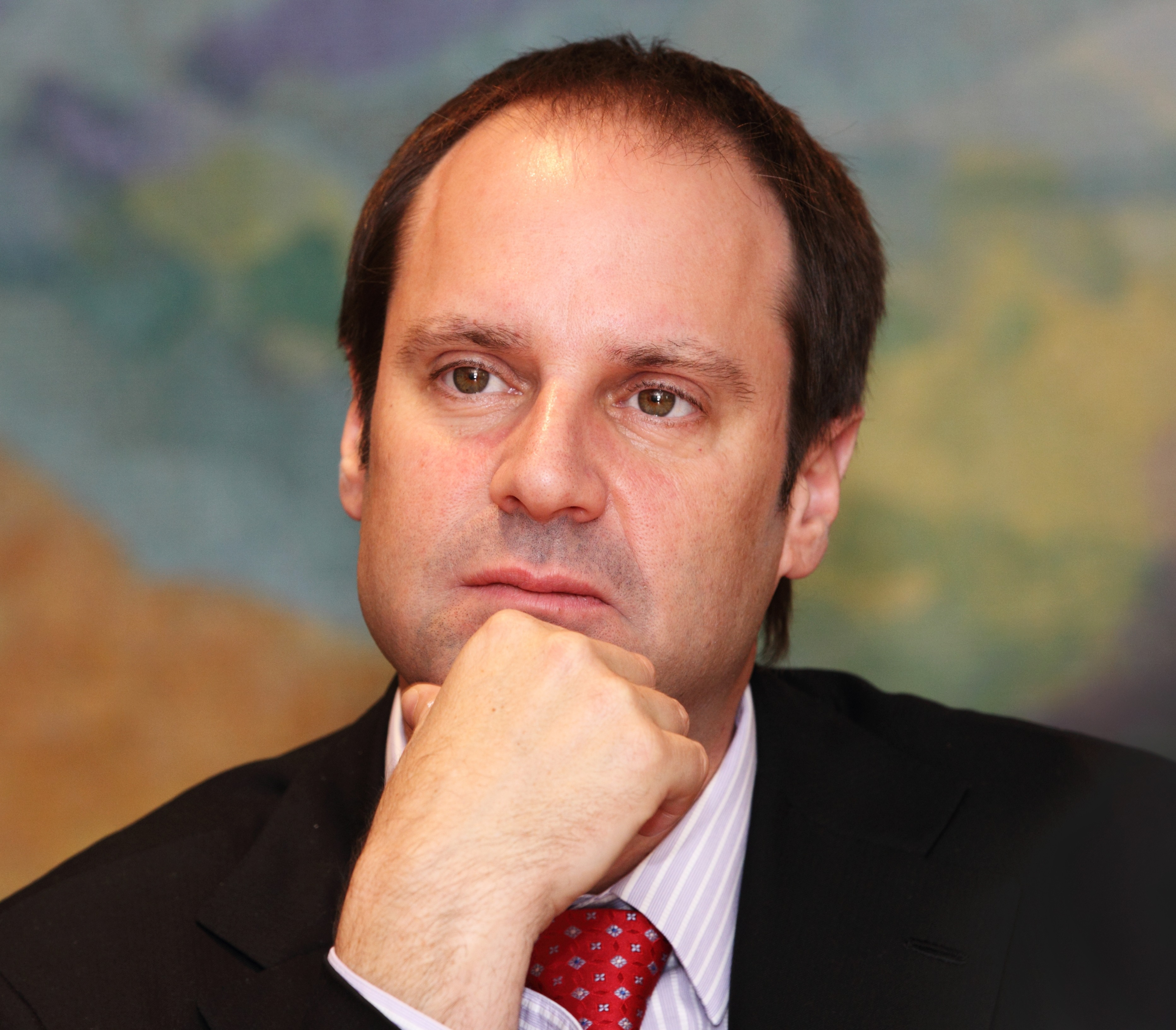
- Skoll in 2013
- Born: January 16, 1965 (age 61); Montreal, Quebec, Canada
- Education: University of Toronto; Stanford University
- Occupations: President of eBay (1996–1998); Founder and chairman of Participant Media; Founder and chairman of the Skoll Foundation
- Spouse: Stephanie Swedlove (m. 2014; div. 2019)

Jeffrey Stuart Skoll OC (born January 16, 1965) is a Canadian engineer, billionaire internet entrepreneur, and film producer. He was the first president of eBay, eventually using the wealth this gave him to become a philanthropist, particularly through the Skoll Foundation, and his media company Participant Media. He founded an investment firm, Capricorn Investment Group, soon after and currently serves as its chairman. Born in Montreal, Quebec, he graduated from the University of Toronto in 1987 and left Canada to attend Stanford University's business school in 1993.

Shortly after graduating from business school, he began his career at eBay. While at the company, he began the eBay Foundation which was allocated pre-IPO stock now worth $32 million. Once eBay's second-largest stockholder, behind Omidyar, he subsequently cashed out a portion of his company holdings, netting him about $2 billion. With an estimated net worth of $4 billion in 2026, Skoll was ranked by Forbes as the seventh wealthiest Canadian and 134th in the United States. As of 2026, his net worth is $5.9 billion.

Through his former film production company, Participant–of which he was founder, owner, and chairman–he produced numerous critically acclaimed films. His first films Syriana (2005), Good Night, and Good Luck (2005), and North Country (2005), along with the documentary Murderball (2005), accounted for 11 Oscar nominations in 2006. His subsequent films have included An Inconvenient Truth (2006), Fast Food Nation (2006), The World According to Sesame Street (2006), Waiting for "Superman" (2010), Lincoln (2012), and his latest, Spotlight (2015) won the Academy Award for Best Picture in 2016.

== Early life ==
Jeff Skoll was born to a Jewish family in Montreal, Quebec, Canada. His mother was a teacher and his father was a chemical company owner who sold industrial chemicals. The family settled in Toronto in the late seventies. When Skoll was fourteen, his father was diagnosed with cancer which prompted him to discuss with his son how much he regretted not having had the time to do everything he had planned in life. His first job was pumping gas at a York Mills gas station.

He graduated with a BASc with honours in 1987 from the University of Toronto's electrical engineering program. While an undergraduate student, he co-edited the engineering students' satirical newspaper The Toike Oike. He paid his way through college by pumping gas in North York, Ontario. After graduating he backpacked around the world for several months before returning and founding two businesses in Toronto: Skoll Engineering, an information technology consulting firm and Micros on the Move Ltd., a computer rental firm. He left Canada in 1993 to earn a Master of Business Administration degree at Stanford Graduate School of Business, graduating in 1995. After Stanford he worked on internet projects for publishing company Knight-Ridder.

== Skoll's eBay era ==
In 1996, Skoll met eBay's founder Pierre Omidyar, who hired him as the company's first president and first full-time employee. While eBay was already profitable at the time Skoll joined, he wrote the business plan that eBay followed in subsequent years, using a typical five-year projection. He remained President until the arrival of Meg Whitman in January 1998 when he became Vice President, Strategic Planning and Analysis until back problems necessitated his departure from full-time employment at the company. In 1998, he championed the creation of the eBay Foundation, which was allocated pre-IPO stock now worth $32 million. Once eBay's second largest stockholder, behind Omidyar, he subsequently cashed out a portion of his company holdings, yielding him around $2 billion.

== Participant ==
In 2004, Skoll founded the company Participant to create films that increase public awareness of critical social issues and give audiences opportunities to get involved through education and social action campaigns. In 2005, Skoll's first Participant productions were released, with Syriana; Good Night, and Good Luck; North Country; and Murderball, together garnering 11 Oscar nominations. A year later, Skoll financed and played a key role in the creation of the environmental documentary, An Inconvenient Truth, which grew out of a slideshow developed by former U.S. Vice President Al Gore on the climate crisis. The film won the 2006 Academy Award for Best Feature Documentary. "I would never have predicted that a film like An Inconvenient Truth would impact so many people", Skoll told Philanthropy Roundtable.

The Financial Times reported in 2009 that Participant allows Skoll to "pursue social and political causes through a mass medium. From modest beginnings, the company (which Skoll chairs, supported by a team of executives) is now a serious player." Fortune wrote the next year that Skoll's films are not typical Hollywood fare, "they tackle weighty subjects such as eco-Armageddon, petro-terrorism, education reform, and women's rights. In short they tend to reflect Skoll's progressive, and ultimately optimistic, worldview that shining a light on the world's problems will inspire people to band together to bring about change on a large scale. (Indeed, the name 'Participant' evokes a call to action.)"

Skoll has served as executive producer or producer on nearly 100 Participant films, including Spotlight, Roma, and American Factory, and as of 2019 Participant has won 18 Oscars and received 73 Academy Award nominations. In 2020, the company received another Academy Award nomination and win for best documentary feature for American Factory.

According to The Hollywood Reporter, in 2014 Skoll funded the creation of the Skoll Center for Social Impact Entertainment at the UCLA School of Theater, Film and Television, saying at the time: "I founded Participant Media in the belief that a story well told has the power to ignite positive social change. This new center at UCLA TFT is an extension of that vision, with the goal of empowering a new generation and elevating storytelling as a tool to create impact and empower people to connect to the social issues that can have a profound impact on our world." In March 2019, Participant and the Skoll Center for Social Impact Entertainment released a report, "The State of Social Impact Entertainment", that said: "social impact entertainment — narrative and documentary film, television, theater, and emerging forms that engage audiences in solving real-world challenges — is not a fad but the future of the entertainment industry."

In 2019, on behalf of Participant, Skoll and Participant CEO David Linde accepted the newly created TIFF Impact Award from the Toronto International Film Festival; in 2020 the award was renamed the Jeff Skoll Award in Impact Media, and has continued to be awarded to filmmakers whose work has had a social impact as part of the TIFF Tribute Awards.

Skoll announced in April 2024 that Participant was shuttering.

== Philanthropy ==
Skoll is a recipient of the Carnegie Medal of Philanthropy, and a Giving Pledge signatory. He has given the eponymous Skoll Foundation approximately $1 billion of eBay stock since its formation in 1999. The Foundation supports "social entrepreneurship".

As of 2020, Skoll has been working for over ten years to help prevent pandemics and other global threats. In 2009, Skoll donated $100 million to create the Skoll Global Threats Fund to confront threats including climate change, water security, pandemics, nuclear proliferation, and Middle East conflict. The Fund created and spun off a stand-alone non-profit entity, Ending Pandemics, that focuses on pandemic detection and response. In 2011, Skoll's film company Participant co-produced the film Contagion to raise awareness about the dangers posed by pandemics. Skoll wanted the film be scientifically sound and encourage funding of medical experts; In 2020, following the COVID-19 pandemic media coverage noted it was "shocking in its accuracy".

In January 2020, Skoll donated $20 million, and an additional $100 million in April, to the Skoll Foundation to combat the COVID-19 pandemic. The funds were used to assist with testing, contact tracing, and provide respiratory devices and other medical equipment to countries that couldn't afford it.

Skoll is active in "collaborative philanthropy" and has joined with other philanthropists and foundations to pool resources that then flow to non-profits focused on addressing specific issues at scale. In 2017, Skoll, joined with others to create Co-Impact, a philanthropic funding collaborative seeded with $500 million, whose "specific aim is to fund organizations that are addressing health, education and economic opportunity in low-to-middle income countries".

Similarly in 2018, Skoll, Chris Anderson, Virgin Unite, among others launched The Audacious Project, a philanthropic funding collaborative with an initial investment of $250 million for "audacious ideas" that deliver "impact at scale". Some of the first recipients of funding from The Audacious Project included the Environmental Defense Fund, Sight Savers, and The Bail Project.

Skoll has funded the creation of academic centers at two universities. In 2003, Skoll funded the creation of the Skoll Center for Social Entrepreneurship at Oxford University's Said Business School. The center is a research center, hub for innovators, and host of the annual Skoll World Forum on Social Entrepreneurship. Called the "Davos for the nonprofit set" by Forbes, Skoll World Forum participants have included leading thinkers from South African Archbishop Desmond Tutu to former U.S. Vice President Al Gore. In 2019, Skoll also funded the creation of the Skoll Center for Social Impact Entertainment at the UCLA School of Theater, Film and Television. The center is dedicated to promoting social change through entertainment and the arts.

In 2005, Skoll financed The Gandhi Project in partnership with Relief International which created a dubbed version in Arabic of the film Gandhi. They used Palestinian voice actors and artists to make the film particularly relevant to Palestinians. With Skoll's support, it was screened throughout Palestine to promote non-violence, self-reliance, economic development, and empowerment.

In 2000, Skoll gave C$7.5 million to the University of Toronto to endow three chairs and establish the Jeffrey Skoll BASc/MBA Program, a joint program of the Faculty of Applied Science and Engineering and the Rotman School of Management.

=== Impact investing ===
Skoll was one of the earliest proponents of socially responsible investing, called "impact investing", through which he invests in for-profit companies whose mission is to deliver both social impact and financial returns. In 2001, Skoll created Capricorn Investment Group "on the premise of socially responsible investing" and the firm now oversees more than $5 billion in client assets and another $3.5 billion in partnership with other organizations. According to Forbes, a "significant portion" of Capricorn's assets "has been put to work backing mostly private companies that are in some way aiming to help the environment and combat climate change". Capricorn's early investments included electric carmaker Tesla, Inc., battery technology developer QuantumScape, and air taxi developer Joby Aviation. Other investments include private equity fund Encourage Solar Finance to promote rooftop solar installations in India.

In 2016, Skoll, along with Bono and investment firm TPG, co-founded The Rise Fund, a $2 billion social-impact fund with "a series of strict metrics by which to measure social impact". Rise's investments fall across seven sectors, including agriculture, education, and healthcare, and since 2017, "Rise has invested in more than 25 growth-stage companies that are making a measurable positive social and/or environmental impact".

== Other activities ==
In November 2022, Skoll bought a minority stake in Monumental Sports & Entertainment.

== Personal life ==
In 2014, Skoll married television executive Stephanie Swedlove. In January 2019, it was announced Skoll had filed for divorce from Swedlove.

== Honors and awards ==
- Bloomberg Business Week's list of most innovative philanthropists (2002–present)
- National Leadership Award for Commonwealth Club Silicon Valley (2004)
- Outstanding Philanthropist Award from the International Association of Fundraising Professionals (2003)
- Outstanding Philanthropist Award from the Silicon Valley chapter of the Association of Fundraising Professionals (2002)
- Honorary Doctor of Laws degree from the University of Toronto (2003)
- Time Magazine's 100 People of the Year (2006)
- Wired Magazine's Rave Award (2006)
- He was made an Officer of the Order of Canada "for his generous commitment to social causes and for his innovative practice of philanthropy." (2011)
- Carnegie Medal of Philanthropy (2017)

== Filmography ==
=== Film ===
Year	Title	Notes
2004	House of D	executive producer
2005	Good Night, and Good Luck	executive producer
2005	North Country	executive producer
2005	Syriana	executive producer
2005	American Gun	executive producer
2006	The World According to Sesame Street	executive producer
2006	An Inconvenient Truth	executive producer
2006	Fast Food Nation	executive producer
2007	Chicago 10	executive producer
2007	Angels in the Dust	executive producer
2007	Man from Plains	executive producer
2007	Darfur Now	executive producer
2007	The Kite Runner	executive producer
2007	Charlie Wilson's War	executive producer
2007	The Visitor	executive producer
2007	Man from Plains	executive producer
2008	Standard Operating Procedure	executive producer
2008	Pressure Cooker	executive producer
2008	Food, Inc.	executive producer
2009	The Soloist	executive producer
2009	The Informant!	executive producer
2010	The Crazies	executive producer
2010	Furry Vengeance	executive producer
2010	Waiting for "Superman"	executive producer
2010	Fair Game	executive producer
2010	Countdown to Zero	executive producer
2010	Cane Toads: The Conquest	executive producer
2010	Casino Jack and the United States of Money	executive producer
2011	The Beaver	executive producer
2011	The Help	executive producer
2011	Contagion	executive producer
2011	Last Call at the Oasis	executive producer
2011	The Best Exotic Marigold Hotel	executive producer
2012	A Place at the Table	executive producer
2012	State 194	executive producer
2012	Lincoln	executive producer
2012	Promised Land	executive producer
2012	No	executive producer
2013	Snitch	executive producer
2013	Made in America	executive producer
2013	The Fifth Estate	executive producer
2013	The Square	executive producer
2013	The Unknown Known	executive producer
2014	Ceaser Chavez	executive producer
2014	The Great Invisible	executive producer
2014	Misconception	executive producer
2014	The Prophet	executive producer
2014	The Ardor	executive producer
2014	The Hundred-Foot Journey	executive producer
2014	Out of the Dark	executive producer
2014	Merchants of Doubt	executive producer
2014	Citizenfour	executive producer
2014	A Most Violent Year	executive producer
2015	3 1/2 Minutes, 10 Bullets	executive producer
2015	The Second Best Exotic Marigold Hotel	executive producer
2015	He Named Me Malala	executive producer
2015	Bridge of Spies	executive producer
2015	Beasts of No Nation	executive producer
2015	Our Brand Is Crisis	executive producer
2015	Spotlight	executive producer
2016	Zero Days	executive producer
2016	The Music of Strangers	executive producer
2016	Death by a Thousand Cuts	executive producer
2016	Neruda	producer
2016	The Light Between Oceans	executive producer
2016	Denial	executive producer
2016	Deepwater Horizon	executive producer
2016	Middle School: The Worst Years of My Life	executive producer
2016	A Monster Calls	executive producer
2016	Midsommer in Newtown	executive producer
2017	An Inconvenient Sequel: Truth to Power	producer
2017	Melting Ice	executive producer
2017	A Fantastic Woman	executive producer
2017	Shot Caller	executive producer
2017	Human Flow	executive producer
2017	Far from the Tree	executive producer
2017	Wonder	executive producer
2018	The Price of Free	executive producer
2018	7 Days in Entebbe	executive producer
2018	Foster	executive producer
2018	This is Climate Change	executive producer
2018	Roma	executive producer
2018	Aquarela	executive producer
2018	Green Book	executive producer
2018	On the Basis of Sex	executive producer
2019	The Boy Who Harnessed the Wind	executive producer
2019	American Factory	executive producer
2019	Captive State	executive producer
2019	Watson	executive producer
2019	Slay the Dragon	executive producer
2019	Just Mercy	executive producer
2019	Sing Me a Song	executive producer
2019	Dark Waters	executive producer
2020	John Lewis: Good Trouble	executive producer
2020	Final Account	executive producer
2020	American Utopia	executive producer
2020	Totally Under Control	executive producer
2021	My Name is Pauli Murray	executive producer
2021	Judas and the Black Messiah	executive producer
2021	Unseen Skies	executive producer
2021	White Coat Rebels	executive producer
2021	Stillwater	executive producer
2021	Costa Brava, Lebanon	executive producer
2021	The Good House	executive producer
2021	The First Wave	executive producer
2022	Descendant	executive producer
2022	'¡Viva Maestro!	executive producer
2022	Lowndes County and the Road to Black Power	executive producer
2022	A Compassionate Spy	executive producer
2022	All the Beauty and the Bloodshed	executive producer
2023	White Bird	executive producer
2023	We Grown Now	executive producer
2024	Rob Peace	executive producer

=== TV series ===
Year	Title	Notes
2013	Jersey Strong	executive producer
2013	Teach	executive producer
2014	HitRecord on TV	executive producer
2014	Human Resources	executive producer
2014–2016	Please Like Me	executive producer
2015–2016	Angry Planet	executive producer
2015	Secret Lives of Americans	executive producer
2016	Truth to Power	executive producer
2018	America to Me	executive producer
2019	When They See Us	executive producer
2020	Noughts + Crosses	executive producer
2020	City So Real	executive producer
2022	Keep Sweet: Pray and Obey	executive producer
2024	Conbody vs. Everybody	executive producer
2026	Trust Me: The False Prophet	executive producer

== See also ==
- List of billionaires
- List of Canadians
- List of University of Toronto people
- List of Stanford University people

Business positions
Preceded by New title	Chief Executive Officer of eBay; 1996–1998	Succeeded by Meg Whitman
Preceded by New title	President of eBay; 1996–1998	Succeeded by Meg Whitman
