= Conbody vs. Everybody =

American documentary series

- Genre: Documentary
- Directed by: Debra Granik
- Country of origin: United States
- Original language: English
- No. of episodes: 5

Production
- Executive producers: Jeff Skoll; Diane Weyermann; Joslyn Barnes; Jonathan Scheuer
- Producers: Debra Granik; Anne Rosellini; Victoria Stewart
- Cinematography: Eric Phillips-Horst; Kefenste Johnson; Sean Hanley
- Editor: Victoria Stewart
- Production companies: Participant; Still Rolling; Louverture Films; Meerkat Media Collective

Original release
- Network: The Criterion Channel
- Release: May 1, 2026

Conbody vs. Everybody is an 2024 American documentary series directed and produced by Debra Granik. It follows Coss Marte over the course of eight years, as he launches Conbody, a gym with a social purpose: employ formerly incarcerated people like himself to combat the high rate of recidivism.

It had its world premiere at the 2024 Sundance Film Festival on January 23, 2024. It was released on May 1, 2026, on The Criterion Channel.

== Premise ==
Follows Coss Marte over the course of eight years, as he launches Conbody, a gym with a social purpose: employ formerly incarcerated people like himself to combat the high rate of recidivism.

== Episodes ==
No.	Title	Directed by	Original release date
1	"Origins"	Debra Granik	May 1, 2026
2	"New Horizons + Growing Pains"	Debra Granik	May 1, 2026
3	"Ups and Downs"	Debra Granik	May 1, 2026
4	"Here to Stay"	Debra Granik	May 1, 2026
5	"We Belong"	Debra Granik	May 1, 2026

== Release ==
Two episodes premiered at the 2024 Sundance Film Festival on January 23, 2024. The first and second episodes also screened at DOC NYC in November 2024. In March 2026, it was announced The Criterion Channel acquired the series, and set it for a May 1, 2026 release.

== Reception ==
On the review aggregator website Rotten Tomatoes, 100% of 5 critics' reviews are positive.

Brian Tallerico of RogerEbert.com gave the series a 3.5 out of 4, writing: "The personal and the political intertwine in this moving, novelistic series, a reminder that Granik is a filmmaker who deserves to be mentioned alongside the best working today." Nadia Dalimonte of Next Best Picture gave the series a 9 out of 10, writing: "With a nuanced perspective, Granik’s Conbody VS Everybody sparks necessary discussions of prevalent issues and follows an incredibly challenging yet hopeful path towards redemption."
