= Christine Marie (psychologist) =

American media psychologist

- Born: April 29, 1960 (age 66); Shelby, Michigan, U.S.
- Education: Fielding Graduate University
- Occupations: Media psychologist, author, educator, speaker, activist
- Known for: Investigating Samuel Bateman and appearing in Trust Me: The False Prophet
- Spouse: Tolga Katas
- Children: 4

Christine Marie (born April 29, 1960) is an American media psychologist, author, educator, speaker, and activist. Her work focuses on media psychology, cult psychology, trauma, public shaming, victim blaming, resilience, and the psychological effects of coercive influence. She is the founder of the nonprofit organization Voices for Dignity.

Marie became widely known in 2026 through the Netflix four-part documentary series Trust Me: The False Prophet, which chronicles her and her husband, videographer Tolga Katas, as they documented the Fundamentalist Church of Jesus Christ of Latter-Day Saints (FLDS) community in Short Creek and gathered evidence concerning Samuel Bateman, a self-proclaimed prophet who led a splinter group within the FLDS movement.

== Early life and education ==
Marie was born in Shelby, Michigan, on April 29, 1960. Before pursuing her academic career, she worked in several fields, including as a beauty pageant contestant, ventriloquist, escape artist, and kindergarten teacher.

Marie earned a bachelor's degree in psychology from Brigham Young University in 1989. She subsequently earned a master's degree in psychology and a Master of Business Administration (MBA), before completing a PhD in psychology with an emphasis in media psychology at Fielding Graduate University in 2020.

Her doctoral dissertation, The Traumatic Impact of Media Humiliation, Misrepresentation and Victim-Blaming on Narrative Identity and Well-Being, examined the effects of humiliation, misrepresentation, and victim blaming in the media on narrative identity and psychological well-being.

== Professional career ==
Marie describes herself as a media psychologist whose work combines media psychology, positive psychology, trauma, resilience, and the study of coercive influence. She has written and spoken about media misrepresentation, public shaming, victim blaming, trauma bonds, life stories, and the psychological effects of media and social media.

She has appeared as a commentator or expert in television and other media, including A&E, Discovery Networks, NBC, History, and other outlets.

Marie has also discussed her own experiences with coercive religious environments and what she describes as cult-based human trafficking. She has said that the experience, and subsequent public reactions to her story, contributed to her decision to study media psychology and the effects of victim blaming and misrepresentation.

== Voices for Dignity ==
Marie founded Voices for Dignity, a nonprofit organization that promotes kindness and compassion and provides resources and advocacy for vulnerable people and survivors of spiritual abuse, human trafficking, public shaming, and other forms of trauma.

The organization became involved in humanitarian work in the Short Creek area, including assistance to members of the FLDS community. A 2017 report by The Salt Lake Tribune described Voices for Dignity as helping residents of Short Creek with housing, legal assistance, clothing, and other necessities.

== Short Creek and investigation of Samuel Bateman ==
Marie first became involved with the Short Creek community in 2015, when she went to the area to assist residents following a deadly flash flood. She and Katas subsequently moved from Las Vegas to Short Creek in 2016, where they continued humanitarian work and began documenting the community.

Initially, Marie and Katas were not investigating a crime. They were providing assistance to members of the community and documenting their experiences. Their work gave them access to people within the insular FLDS community and enabled them to develop relationships with residents.

Marie and Katas eventually came into contact with Samuel Bateman, who claimed to be a prophet and successor to imprisoned FLDS leader Warren Jeffs. Bateman began accumulating wives and followers, including minors, while claiming divine authority.

As suspicions about Bateman's conduct grew, Marie and Katas began recording their interactions with him. Bateman welcomed their cameras because he believed that the resulting documentary could promote his message. Instead, the footage became evidence of his activities.

The recordings and information gathered by Marie and Katas were subsequently provided to law enforcement. According to reporting by The Guardian, the footage and witnesses they helped identify were important to the FBI's case against Bateman and other defendants.

Bateman was arrested in 2022. In December 2024, he was sentenced to 50 years in federal prison after pleading guilty to conspiracy to commit transportation of a minor for criminal sexual activity and conspiracy to commit kidnapping.

== Trust Me: The False Prophet ==
In 2026, Marie became one of the central figures in the Netflix documentary series Trust Me: The False Prophet. The four-part series, directed by Rachel Dretzin, uses extensive footage recorded by Marie and Katas during their years in Short Creek and follows their investigation of Bateman.

The series premiered on Netflix on April 8, 2026. It became one of Netflix's most-watched programs and brought Marie international attention.

The documentary also examines the psychological conflict Marie experienced while gathering evidence against people who had come to trust her. She has described the process as a moral conflict because she believed that exposing Bateman would ultimately protect women and children, while simultaneously betraying the trust of people within the community.

== Personal life ==
Marie married Tolga Katas in 2011. Katas is a videographer and music producer who worked with Marie on the documentation of the Short Creek community and the investigation of Bateman.

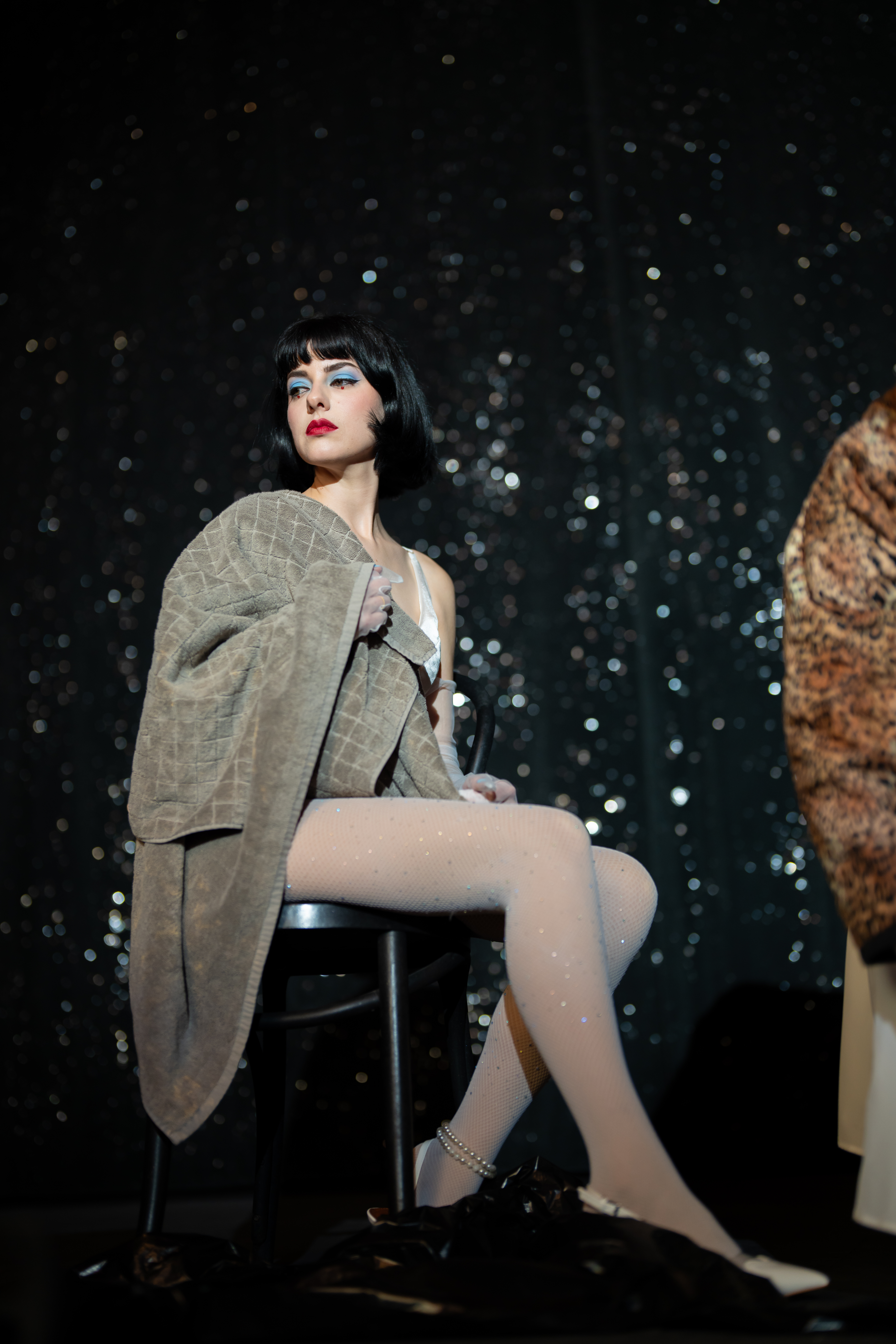
Lola Blanc, Marie's daughter. Actress, singer and creative artist

Marie has four children from her previous marriage. One of them is singer-songwriter and actress Lola Blanc, born Kandice Marie Melonakos.

Marie and Katas continue to live in the Short Creek area and remain involved in work with members of the FLDS community.

== Awards and recognition ==
According to Marie's professional biography, her doctoral dissertation received the Outstanding Dissertation Award from the American Psychological Association's Division of Media Psychology and Technology in 2021.

She was also reported to have received the Harriet Tubman Peace Medallion in 2024 for advocacy related to survivors of coercive environments.

== See also ==
- Fundamentalist Church of Jesus Christ of Latter-Day Saints
- Warren Jeffs
- Samuel Bateman
- Cult
- Coercive control
- Media psychology
- Trust Me: The False Prophet
