= Sabine Singh =

American actress (born 1974)

Sabine Erika Singh (born August 4, 1974) is an American actress.

== Early life ==
Sabine Singh was born in New York. Her father, Anand Singh, and mother, Gisa Singh, née Voigt, immigrated to the United States from India and Austria respectively. Before graduating from NYU's Tisch School of the Arts, Singh attended The University of Michigan, as well as the London Academy of Music and Dramatic Art (LAMDA) and the British American Drama Academy both in London. Continuing her love of Shakespeare, she studied at Balliol College at the University of Oxford.

== Career ==
Singh was a founding company member of Jim Simpson's and Mac Wellman's award-winning The Flea Theater. She was one of the first "BATS", the Obie Award winning resident acting troupe of The Flea, that primarily presented new and experimental voices of the downtown NY theatre world. Sabine recently appeared off-Broadway as "Olivia" in the critically acclaimed production of The Gold Standard, a play by Daniel Roberts. From The New York Times review: "Olivia (Sabine Singh) is a genuine beauty who spends Act 1 ... imitating Michelle Pfeiffer's sinuous lounge singer from The Fabulous Baker Boys... She's the kind of stunning blonde who practically stops traffic."

Her film credits include Tony Goldwyn's Someone Like You, The Anarchist Cookbook, and Ricky Six. Her film Maryam opened Robert De Niro's first Tribeca Film Festival, where Sabine was honored and invited to participate as guest speaker. Her TV credits include guest and recurring roles on The Sopranos, Las Vegas, Dawson's Creek, Diagnosis Murder, Charmed, CSI: NY, and Law & Order.

Beginning March 2007, Singh filmed more than 170 episodes as Greenlee Smythe on All My Children, replacing the original Greenlee Rebecca Budig, who had left the show two years prior. Singh's performance prenominated her as Best Supporting Actress for the Daytime Emmy Awards as well as Daytime Confidential's 2007 'Top Newcomer' award.

In December 2007, it was announced that Singh was fired from the role, to be replaced by Budig. The producers of All My Children broke Singh's contract to bring back the original actress. This sparked a firestorm of controversy because of how Singh was treated and let go. Besides giving Singh only a four-day notice of termination, her firing no longer qualified her for the Emmy. Fans were appalled by the commercials that ABC put out calling Budig the "Real" Greenlee, as well as the clock counting the days until Rebecca's return, which watermarked the screen during Singh's final month of airing. Singh last aired on All My Children on January 15, 2008. Budig returned the next day.

After her exit from All My Children, Singh returned to theatre work in May 2008 and starred in the one woman play The Euthanasiast — Liza Lentini's exploration of care-givers and the right to die — at PS 122 in New York City.

After The Euthanasist Singh continued acting in various TV film and theatre - most notably as Amy Townsend in Law & Order: Criminal Intent and spent 2008 and 2009 hosting the travel show Voyages exploring the culture and beauty of the Caribbean Islands. In 2010 she was chosen by Bacardi as the face of Bombay Sapphire Gin, traveling and acting as spokesperson for the brand.

Although Singh always worked as a social advocate donating time with various non profits, human service organizations, and charities, in 2011 she began working as a full-time volunteer, advocate and activist, starting PURE, a non-profit advocating, spreading awareness, and raising money to intercept, rescue and help in the recovery of sex trafficked children in South East Asia and various areas of the Indian subcontinent.

== Filmography ==
=== Film ===
Year	Title	Role	Notes
2000	Ricky 6	Kelly Joseph	
2001	Someone Like You	Girl in Bar	
2002	Maryam	Jill	
2002	The Anarchist Cookbook	Gin	
2002	The Fine Line Between Cute and Creepy	Mary	

=== Television ===
Year	Title	Role	Notes
1999	Student Affairs	Jordan	TV series
1999	Law & Order	Allison	Episode: "Tabula Rasa"
1999	Strangers with Candy	Yasmine Sarong	Episode: "Jerri Is Only Skin Deep"
2000	The Sopranos	Tracy	Episode: "House Arrest"
2001	Diagnosis: Murder	Jennie Slater	Episode: "Playing God"
2001	Charmed	Missy	Episode: "Coyote Piper"
2001	Dawson's Creek	Anna Evans	Episodes: "Hopeless", "A Winter's Tale"
2002	The Random Years	Sydney	Episode: "Dangerous Liaisions"
2002	Nancy Drew	Allison Price	TV film
2005	Unscripted	Emmanuelle's Friend	Episode: "1.9"
2005	Martha Behind Bars	Lexi Stewart	TV film
2006	Las Vegas	Lissy	Episode: "Like a Virgin"
2006	CSI: NY	Erica Lancaster	Episode: "People with Money"
2007–2008	All My Children	Greenlee Smythe	Regular role (160 episodes)
2009	Law & Order: Criminal Intent	Amy Townsend	Episode: "Alpha Dog"
2010	One Life to Live	Wendy	Recurring role (4 episodes)
