= Colorado City/Hildale Police Department =

US municipal law enforcement agency

- Common name: Colorado City/Hildale Police Department

Jurisdictional structure
- Operations jurisdiction: Arizona; Utah, USA
- Population: 3,500
- Legal jurisdiction: Colorado City, Arizona; Hildale, Utah
- General nature: Local civilian police

Operational structure
- Headquarters: 50 N Colvin St. Colorado City, Arizona
- Agency executive: Robb Radley, Chief of Police

Website
- www.tocc.us/police

The Colorado City/Hildale Police Department is the police department of the cross-border towns of Colorado City, Arizona and Hildale, Utah.

== Background ==
The twin towns of Colorado City and Hildale have historically been home to the Fundamental Church of Jesus Church of Latter Day Saints (FLDS), a group that practices polygamy. Following the arrest of the churches' prophet Warren Jeffs in 2006 on charges of sexual assault on children, the police department was revealed to have been largely controlled by the church, and its undercover units were nicknamed the 'God Squad'.

Following major reforms throughout the two communities, the town governments, including the police departments have distanced themselves from the religious group.

The department was heavily featured in the 2026 Netflix documentary series Trust Me: The False Prophet, focusing on their role during the investigation and eventual arrest of Samuel Bateman.
