= Daniel Roberts (playwright) =

American dramatist

Daniel Roberts (born 1969) is a writer, investor, and philanthropist.

== Early life and career ==
Daniel Roberts is the author of a USA Today best-selling novel, Bar Maid Arcade Press (Simon and Schuster) November 2021. His first. His second novel Ponder (Arcade Press; Simon and Schuster) was released October 8, 2024, and was an Amazon Top 150 for Adult Romance.

Roberts graduated with a B.A. (1991) and M.A. (1994) from the University of Pennsylvania. He edited the literary magazine Press from 1995 to 2001. He was the founder of the Audax Theatre Group and publisher of The Hineni Writer's Workshop Review.

He is the author of a number of plays. In 2001, with his brother Sam, he wrote the OOBR Award-winning play The Beginning of the And. Other works include Last Day, starring Heather Raffo, and Brando, starring Kate Roe and Dante Giammarco, and featuring Nina Wheeler-Chalfin, which Time Out New York called "An impressive piece of writing ... recalling Edward Albee or John Guare". Then there was Frankie starring Kristina Klebe, The Gold Standard starring Sabine Singh and Jordan Charney, and Monsterface starring Sarah Grace Wilson and Ted Schneider, and featuring Karen Lynn Gorney.

In addition to literary pursuits, Roberts worked with the Boikarabelo, an orphanage in South Africa and, from 2004 until 2015, taught college-level poetry to 4th graders at PS 375/Mosaic Academy in Harlem.

In 2009 Roberts wrote a play entitled Haunted House featuring Anna Wood and Jordan Charney, which was described by The New York Times as "characters that stick".

In 2006, Roberts founded MAPS Inc. MAPS brings together school children of different backgrounds through artistic collaboration and live performances of student-made, original works on a professional stage.

Daniel Roberts is a New York City based venture capitalist and private investor who works in tech, bio-tech, alternative healthcare and home diagnostics.

== Personal life ==
Daniel Roberts's late uncle John Roberts was one of two entrepreneurs responsible for the conception and production of the Woodstock concerts of 1969 and 1994.

The Mahogany Roberts, a rolltop desk designed by Gary Spitzer of Rolltop Desk Works, was named after Daniel Roberts.

Daniel Roberts' father William Roberts owned the Eclipse Award-winning thoroughbred racehorse Smoke Glacken.

Roberts' late mother, Jill Roberts, founded The Jill Roberts Center for Inflammatory Bowel Disease at New York-Presbyterian/Weill Cornell's Stich Building on East 70th Street in New York City. The Center opened in September 2006 under the direction of Ellen Scherl.

He lives and works in New York City.
