= Christine Marie =

Christine Marie may refer to:

- Christine of France (Christine Marie, 1606–1663), sister of Louis XIII and the Duchess of Savoy by marriage
- Christine Marie Berkhout, Dutch biologist
- Christine Marie Cabanos, American voice actress
- Christine Marie von Cappelen, Norwegian botanist
- Christine Marie (psychologist), American media psychologist
