= Preaching Evil: A Wife on the Run with Warren Jeffs =

2022 American Peacock documentary series

- Genre: Documentary; True crime
- Directed by: Douglas Elford-Argent
- Country of origin: United States
- Original language: English
- No. of seasons: 1
- No. of episodes: 4

Production
- Cinematography: Kevin Burke
- Running time: 45–53 minutes
- Production companies: Ark Media; Participant

Original release
- Network: Peacock
- Release: April 26, 2022

Preaching Evil: A wife on the Run with Warren Jeffs is an American documentary television miniseries on Peacock about the polygamous Fundamentalist Church of Jesus Christ of Latter-Day Saints, an offshoot of mainstream Mormonism, and its leader Warren S. Jeffs. The series was released on April 26, 2022, on Peacock. It is directed by Douglas Elford Argent. The series focuses on Jeff's polygamous wife, and personal scribe Naomie Jessop, originally a wife of his father Rulon Jeffs.

== Premise ==
Naomie Jessop Jeffs, daughter of Merril Jessop, and former wife of Rulon Jeffs details her early life, marriage to the then elderly Rulon, and her eventual marriage to his son Warren Jeffs upon him appointing himself prophet. As Jeffs becomes wanted by law enforcement Naomi's own journals from her work as Warren's personal scribe are used to detail her life both in the community of Short Creek (Hilldale, Utah, and Colorado City, Arizona), as well as her time on the run with Jeffs being placed on the FBI's Ten Most Wanted List.

The series also documents the construction and eventual raid of the YFZ Ranch in Eldorado, Texas.

== Episodes ==
No.	Title
1	"A False Prophet Rises"
Warren Jeffs brings wife and personal scribe Naomie on a mission to avoid interest from the law.
2	"Heavenly Sessions"
Jeffs lands on the FBI's Most Wanted list after abusing his members.
3	"The Take Down"
Jeffs is incarcerated, controls the church from prison as his the YFZ ranch is raided.
4	"Justice Served"
Following Jeffs' life sentence, former members contemplate life after the FLDS

== See also ==
- Keep Sweet: Pray and Obey
