= Casino Jack and the United States of Money =

- Release poster
- Directed by: Alex Gibney
- Written by: Alex Gibney
- Produced by: Bill Banowsky; Mark Cuban; Benjamin Goldhirsh; Jeff Skoll; Todd Wagner; Diane Weyermann
- Cinematography: Maryse Alberti
- Edited by: Alison Ellwood
- Music by: David Robbins
- Production companies: Jigsaw Productions; Participant Media
- Distributed by: Magnolia Pictures
- Release dates: January 2010 (Sundance); May 7, 2010 (United States)
- Running time: 118 minutes
- Country: United States
- Language: English
- Box office: $176,865

Casino Jack and the United States of Money is a 2010 American documentary film directed by Alex Gibney. The film premiered at the Sundance Film Festival in January 2010 and was released theatrically in the United States on May 7, 2010. It received positive reviews from critics.

== Synopsis ==
The film focuses on the career of Washington, D.C. lobbyist, businessman, and con man Jack Abramoff, who was involved in a massive corruption scandal that led to the conviction of himself, two Bush White House officials, Rep. Bob Ney, and nine other lobbyists and congressional staffers. Abramoff was convicted of fraud, conspiracy, and tax evasion in 2006 and of trading expensive gifts, meals and sports trips in exchange for political favors. As of December 2010 Abramoff has completed his prison sentence.

== Contributors ==
- Juan Babauta – Governor, CNMI (2002–2006)
- Jim Benedetto – Federal Labor Ombudsman, CNMI (2002-2008)
- Pamela Brown – Former Attorney General, CNMI
- Tom DeLay – U.S. Congressman (R-TX) (1984–2006)
- Nina Easton – Author, Gang of Five
- Peter Fitzgerald – U.S. Senator (R-IL) (1999–2005)
- Thomas Frank – Author, The Wrecking Crew
- David Grosh – Former Rehoboth Beach lifeguard
- Carlos Hisa – Lt. Governor, Tigua Tribe of El Paso, Texas
- Robert G. Kaiser – Author, So Damn Much Money
- Adam Kidan – Former owner, SunCruz Casinos
- Shawn Martin – Reporter, American Press of Lake Charles, Louisiana
- Rep. George Miller (D-CA)
- Bob Ney – U.S. Congressman, (R-OH) (1995–2006)
- Ron Platt – Former Greenberg Traurig lobbyist
- Tom Rodgers – Lobbyist, Carlyle Consulting
- Rep. Dana Rohrabacher (R-CA)
- Khaled Saffuri – Public affairs consultant, Meridian Strategies
- Susan Schmidt – Former reporter, The Washington Post
- David Sickey – Vice Chairman, Coushatta Tribe of Louisiana
- Melanie Sloan – Citizens for Responsibility and Ethics in Washington (CREW)
- Peter Stone – Author, Heist: Superlobbyist Jack Abramoff
- Froilan Tenorio – Governor, CNMI (1994–1998)
- Neil Volz – Former Chief of Staff to Rep. Bob Ney (R-OH)
- J. Michael Waller – Director, Institute of World Politics

== Release ==
The film premiered at the Sundance Film Festival in January 2010. It was released theatrically in the United States on May 7, 2010.

== Reception ==
On the review aggregator website Rotten Tomatoes, the film holds an approval rating of 82%, based on 66 reviews, and an average rating of 7/10. The website's critical consensus reads, "Casino Jack's subject matter is enraging, but in the hands of director Alex Gibney, it's also well-presented and briskly entertaining." Metacritic, which uses a weighted average, assigned the film a score of 68 out of 100, based on 22 critics, indicating "generally favorable" reviews.
