= America to Me =

2018 American documentary television series

- TV release poster
- Directed by: Steve James
- Music by: Joshua Abrams
- Country of origin: United States
- Original language: English
- No. of episodes: 10

Production
- Executive producers: Jeffrey Skoll; Diane Weyermann; Steve James; Justine Nagan; Gordon Quinn; Betsy Steinberg
- Producers: John Condne; Risé Sanders-Weir
- Cinematography: Kevin Shaw; Rebecca Parrish; Bing Liu; Steve James
- Editors: Leslie Simmer; David E. Simpson; Steve James; Alanna Schmelter; Rubin Daniels Jr.
- Running time: 60-90 minutes
- Production companies: Kartemquin Films; Participant Media

Original release
- Network: Starz
- Release: August 26 – October 28, 2018

America to Me is a 2018 American documentary television miniseries directed by Steve James, produced by Kartemquin Films and Participant Media. The 10-episode series was filmed during the 2015-2016 school year at Oak Park and River Forest High School (OPRF) located in Oak Park, Illinois. The series chronicles daily life of twelve students spanning "all the grades and all the tracks within the school."

== Development ==
The OPRF principal Nathaniel Rouse and then-superintendent Steven Isoye opposed the filming and declined to be interviewed for the series. Nevertheless, the school administration cooperated after the filming was approved by the school’s board with some restrictions. According to James, his team was prevented from doing certain things. He said, "I think your sense watching the series is that we're kind of everywhere we want to be, even though we weren't everywhere we wanted to be."

Because of the scope of the project, James split the job of directing and filming between himself and three other "segment directors": Kevin Shaw, who is African-American; Bing Liu, who is Asian-American; and Rebecca Parrish, who is white. According to Kevin Shaw, James gave his co-directors "every opportunity" to have their filmmaking voice, "he wanted it; he needed it". Recruiting a multicultural team of filmmakers helped reducing real or perceived white bias of the series, providing four different points of view.

== Distribution ==
The series' author, Steve James, wanted to balance financial conditions of his distribution contract with the accessibility and discoverability of the series to the viewers. For the first run of the show, he forwent streaming services because he was afraid the series would get lost among thousands of other titles. He also expressed disdain for advertising breaks, pervasive on non-premium cable services. Ultimately, he chose Starz, which carries no advertising. "America to Me" became Starz' first endeavor into serialized documentaries.

As of March, 2019 the series has not been made available on physical media, but is available for streaming with a Starz subscription, or for purchase on Vudu, YouTube, and Google Play.

== Reception ==
Since the series premiere in August 2018, America to Me has received positive reviews from critics. On Metacritic, it received an average score of 96 (indicating universal acclaim) based on 9 reviews, which was the third highest score of any 2018 TV series and the highest for a new series that year. On Rotten Tomatoes, it received a rating of 100% based on 28 critics' reviews.

The series has been praised by critics for "detailed look at inequality in America through the lens of a storied high school near Chicago", for "bitingly honest mediation of the ways race, class, and equity play out in Chicago’s progressive suburb of Oak Park", and was pronounced a "testament to how individuals can persevere within a broken system, and how much harder that system makes it for some of them".
