= Lola Blanc =

American singer, actress, and filmmaker

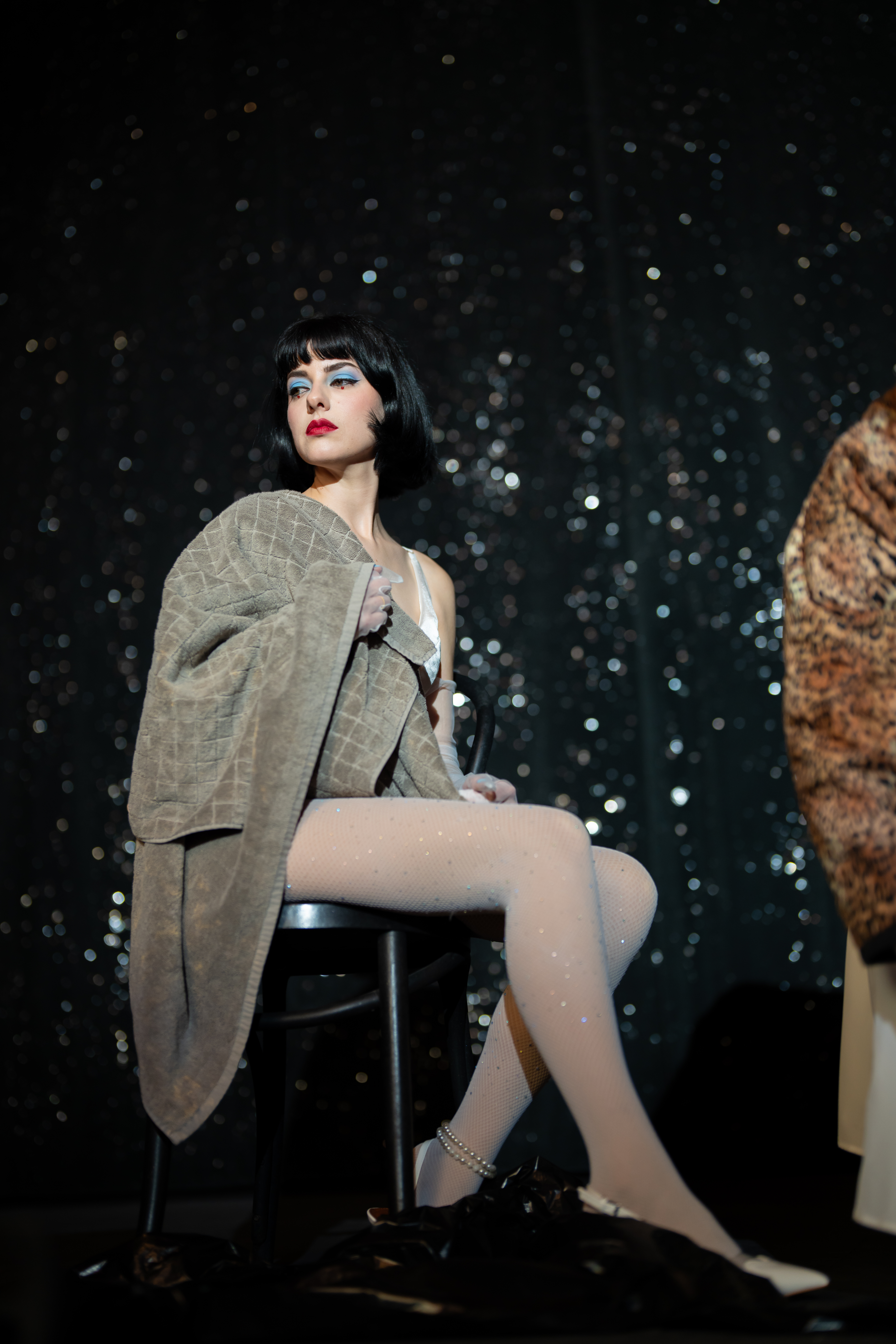
- Blanc in 2025

Background information
- Born: Kandice Marie Melonakos; December 20, 1987 (age 38); Augsburg, West Germany
- Origin: Fremont, Michigan, U.S.
- Genres: Alternative pop; indie; dark cabaret
- Occupations: Singer; songwriter; actress; writer; director
- Years active: 2009–present
- Website: lolablanc.com

Kandice Marie Melonakos (born December 20, 1987), better known by her stage name Lola Blanc, is an American singer, songwriter, filmmaker, podcaster, actress, and activist.

Blanc co-hosts Exactly Right cult podcast Trust Me, which has been featured by The New York Times and Harper's Bazaar.

She co-wrote Britney Spears' top 40 single "Ooh La La". She has appeared on the television show American Horror Story: Hotel. Blanc has also contributed writing for Vice.com, and is an active member of the Democratic Socialists of America.

As of 2026, her song "Angry Too" had surpassed 100,000,000 Spotify plays.

== Early life ==
Blanc was born in Bavaria, Germany but raised primarily on a farm in Fremont, Michigan. Brought up Mormon by her motivational speaker mother, and CIA agent father, she spent much of her childhood writing songs and performing as a ventriloquist and auctioneer with her mother and brother, who performed magic and escape art.

When Blanc was a pre-teen, her mother, Christine Marie, was targeted by a religious impostor posing as a true LDS prophet who played on her beliefs and lured her into his web. Blanc found their letters and believed in him, too; she was temporarily separated from her mother, who was coerced into human trafficking until an accomplice who had a change of heart saved her. They were promptly reunited. Eventually Lola moved to Los Angeles to pursue music full-time.

== Music and podcast ==
Blanc has written songs with artists like Sophie; she collaborated with The Album Leaf and composer Mark Korven on her album Crowd Pleaser.

Blanc originally co-wrote Britney Spears' single "Ooh La La" with Fransisca Hall and producer Ammo for her own project; the title was intended to be a play on her name. When Dr. Luke heard it, he thought it'd be perfect for Spears and brought in songwriters Bonnie McKee and J. Kash to rewrite the lyrics so they would better suit Spears and The Smurfs 2.

Blanc began releasing music independently in 2013, beginning with her EP The Magic. Her song "Angry Too", released in 2018, reached over 100 million streams on Spotify in 2026. In 2025, she released her debut album, Crowd Pleaser.

Her song "Trust Me" was the theme song of Netflix's 2026 docuseries Trust Me: The False Prophet, which follows her mother, Christine Marie, going undercover to get polygamist leader Samuel Bateman arrested. Blanc also briefly appears in the show.

Blanc co-hosts a podcast called Trust Me: Cults, Extreme Belief, and Manipulation. Blanc appears as a former cult member and podcaster in several episodes of Netflix's 2023 documentary How to Become a Cult Leader.

== Film and directing ==
In 2019, Blanc co-founded Fatale Collective, an all-female horror filmmaking collective. The group's debut anthology short film, Bleed, went to Fantastic Fest and won the Director's Award for Cinematic Achievement in a Short Film at FilmQuest.

The horror short film Blanc wrote and directed about a political commentator, Pruning, starred Madeline Brewer of The Handmaid's Tale and premiered at Palm Springs International Shortfest in 2023.

Blanc has made appearances on the television shows American Horror Story: Hotel and Life in Pieces on CBS; she has also acted in films like A24's Under the Silver Lake, playing a member of fictional band Jesus and the Brides of Dracula.

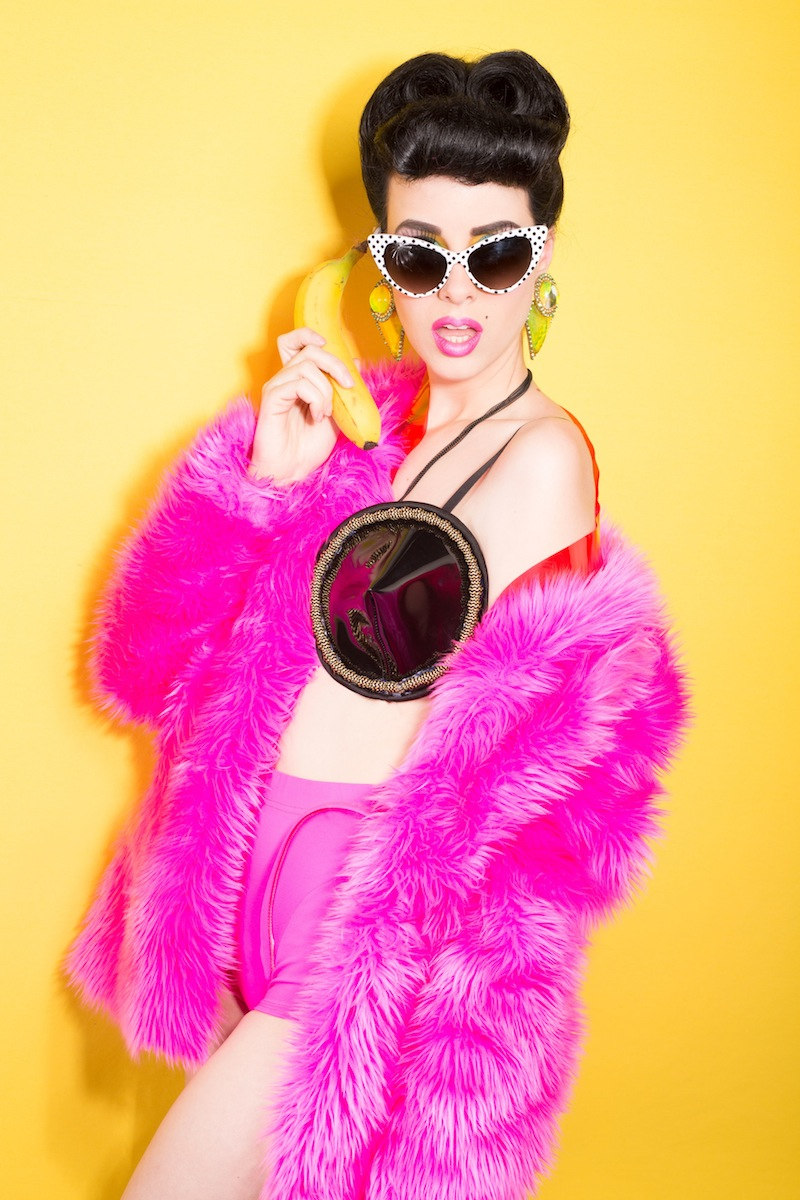
Blanc in 2013

== Discography ==
Studio albums

- Crowd Pleaser (2025)

Extended plays

- The Magic (2016)

Singles (as main artist)

- "Dear Sara" (2025)
- "Everybody" (2025)
- "The Silence" (2024)
- "We Are Not Fine" (2024)
- "Trust Me" (2023)
- "Here Come the Wolves" (2021)
- "Angry Too" (2019)

Singles (as featured artist)

- "Horizon" (with Andrew Rayel) (2018)
- "Oblivion" (with TheFatRat) (2017)

Songs co-written by Blanc

- Jarina De Marco - "Ilegales" (2021)
- Itzy - "24Hrs" (2020)
- TVXQ - "Hot Sauce" (2019)
- Andrew Rayel - "Horizon" (featuring Lola Blanc) (2018)
- TheFatRat - "Oblivion" (featuring Lola Blanc) (2017)
- Britney Spears - "Ooh La La" (2013)
