= Ricky 6 =

- Directed by: Peter Filardi
- Screenplay by: Peter Filardi
- Based on: Say You Love Satan by David St. Clair
- Produced by: Terry G. Jones; Juan-Carlos Zapata; William Vince
- Starring: Vincent Kartheiser; Chad Christ; Sabine Singh; Emmanuelle Chriqui; Patrick Renna
- Cinematography: Rodrigo Prieto
- Edited by: Sam Citron
- Music by: Joe Delia
- Production companies: Orion Pictures; KatzSmith Productions; BRON Creative
- Distributed by: Image Group Entertainment
- Release date: June 2000 (Canada)
- Running time: 111 minutes
- Countries: United States; Mexico; Canada
- Language: English

Ricky 6 is a 2000 American-Mexican-Canadian film co-production loosely based on the life of Ricky Kasso, a suburban teenager accused of Satanism and murder in the 1980s. The film was written and directed by Peter Filardi, and based on the 1987 book, Say You Love Satan by David St. Clair. Vincent Kartheiser played the disturbed protagonist, renamed Ricky Cowen, in the film. The film also stars Chad Christ, Patrick Renna, Sabine Singh and Emmanuelle Chriqui.

Ricky 6 won the Audience Prize at the Fantasia Film Festival in 2000. As of 2025, it has yet to be released in either theaters or on video. However, bootleg VHS and DVD copies of the film have been sold on various Internet sites. Ricky 6 is an international co-production between the United States, Mexico and Canada and was produced by American producer Terry G. Jones, Mexican producer Juan-Carlos Zapata and Canadian producer William Vince. It was filmed in Fredericton and Woodstock, New Brunswick, Canada.

== Cast ==
- Vincent Kartheiser as Ricky Cowen
- Chad Christ as Tommy Portelance
- Sabine Singh as Kelly Joseph
- Richard M. Stuart as Tweasel
- Patrick Renna as Ollie
- Emmanuelle Chriqui as Lee
- Birkett Turton as Greg (credited as Kett Turton)
- Joshua Dov as Wiley
- Charlene Fernetz as Ann Cowen
- Stephen Morgan as Ricky's Stepfather
- Darcy Allan as Beth Cowen (credited as Darcy Allen)
- Hillary Allan as Livvy Cowen
- Speedy as Everett (credited as Donald Caldwell)
- John Lister as Pierce
- Dean Butler as Victor "Vic" Portelance
- Soo Garay as Sarah Portelance
- Terry Kim as George Tobia
- Peter Pacey as Mr. Greer
- Heather Perritt as Dr. Piazza
- Desiree Perruzza as Reporter
- Kevin Gage as Pat Pagan
