= Countdown to Zero =

2010 American film directed by Lucy Walker

- Film poster
- Directed by: Lucy Walker
- Produced by: Lawrence Bender; Bruce Blair; Nikki Boella; Matt Brown; Jeff Skoll
- Narrated by: Gary Oldman (prologue)
- Cinematography: Robert Chappell; Gary Clarke; Bryan Donnell; Nick Higgins
- Edited by: Brad Fuller and Brian Johnson
- Music by: Peter Golub
- Production companies: Participant Media; Lawrence Bender Productions
- Distributed by: Magnolia Pictures
- Release dates: January 25, 2010 (Sundance); July 23, 2010 (United States)
- Running time: 90 minutes
- Country: United States
- Language: English
- Box office: $288,000

Countdown to Zero is a 2010 documentary film by British filmmaker Lucy Walker. The film argues that the likelihood of the use of nuclear weapons has increased since the end of the Cold War due to terrorism, nuclear proliferation, theft of nuclear materials and weapons, and other factors.

The film was set for theatrical release in the United States on July 9, 2010, but this was changed to July 23.

== Production ==
The film features interviews with leading statesmen and experts, including Tony Blair, Jimmy Carter, Mikhail Gorbachev, Robert McNamara, Pervez Musharraf, and Valerie Plame. The film prologue was narrated by Gary Oldman. The musical score was composed by Peter Golub, and the rock band Pearl Jam contributed the song "The Fixer."

It was developed, financed and executive produced by Participant Media together with the World Security Institute. The idea for the film first occurred to the producers when the Nobel Peace Prize was awarded to Al Gore after the success of his documentary about global warming, An Inconvenient Truth. Diane Weyermann of Participant Media asked Walker if she was interested in directing a film about nuclear weapons, and Walker said yes. More than 84 people were interviewed for the film. Global Zero, an international organization promoting the elimination of nuclear weapons, provided production assistance for the film.

The film's closing credits contain a phone number to which a text message may be sent to protest the maintenance of high levels of nuclear arsenals and lax security regarding nuclear weapons and materials.

The film debuted at the Sundance Film Festival in 2010, where it screened at the Palais des Festivals out of competition. At that time, Magnolia Pictures secured the North American theatrical distribution rights. The film was screened privately for Secretary of State Hillary Clinton, and a portion of the film shown for the press at the National Press Club.

The film was accepted at the Cannes Film Festival, where it screened out of competition.

"Love & Peace" by Kazuya Yoshii is the ending theme for the Japanese version.

Tad Daley, writer of the book Apocalypse Never was invited to speak at the film's debut in Washington, DC about the dangers of nuclear weapons. In an interview he said that it was a coincidence that the book and the movie came out virtually exactly at the same time and that Countdown To Zero and Apocalypse Never had the same ambition and that ambition is twofold: 1) to talk to ordinary folks about the nuclear peril and 2) that abolition should be the solution. A video promoting the movie was created with the assistance of Ploughshares, an award-winning literary magazine at Emerson College. The premiere screening took place at the E Street Cinema in Washington, DC and the shows have been sold out. These screenings brought in large crowds.

== Critical reception ==
On the review aggregator website Rotten Tomatoes, 80% of 84 critics' reviews are positive. The website's consensus reads: "Countdown to Zero is more genuinely frightening than many horror movies -- and more soberly enlightening than the average documentary." Metacritic, which uses a weighted average, assigned the film a score of 70 out of 100, based on 26 critics, indicating "generally favorable" reviews.

A review in Daily Variety called the film "highly creative documentary-making" and concluded that the film makes "a convincing argument that the human race is on borrowed time: Given the number of nuclear weapons in existence, the ease with which they can be made, the eagerness of terrorists to possess them and a worldwide cluelessness about nuclear security, it's only a matter of time before something terribly ugly happens. A politically urgent picture, it will also literally scare the breath out of what will certainly be a worldwide audience." The trade journal also highly praised the special effects and cinematography for creating "immaculate images". A review for Reuters said the film was "convincingly argued and extremely polished" and described portions as "absolutely chilling."

The Wall Street Journal called the film "hair-raising" and noted that it was one of the rare documentaries to screen at Cannes. Jason Solomons, writing for The Observer, said the film was one of "five films to watch" at Cannes. The Guardian described the documentary as "unmissable" and "the best horror film of all time".

The Washington Times was highly critical of the film. Its reviewer said the documentary appeared to be produced by "the peacenik movement" and concluded, "The pacifist message of the former is loud and clear: 'Our only option is to eradicate every last nuclear missile'..."

== See also ==
- Nuclear disarmament
- List of films about nuclear issues
  - Nuclear Tipping Point
- White House Peace Vigil
- Doomsday Clock
