= Rachel Dretzin =

American film director

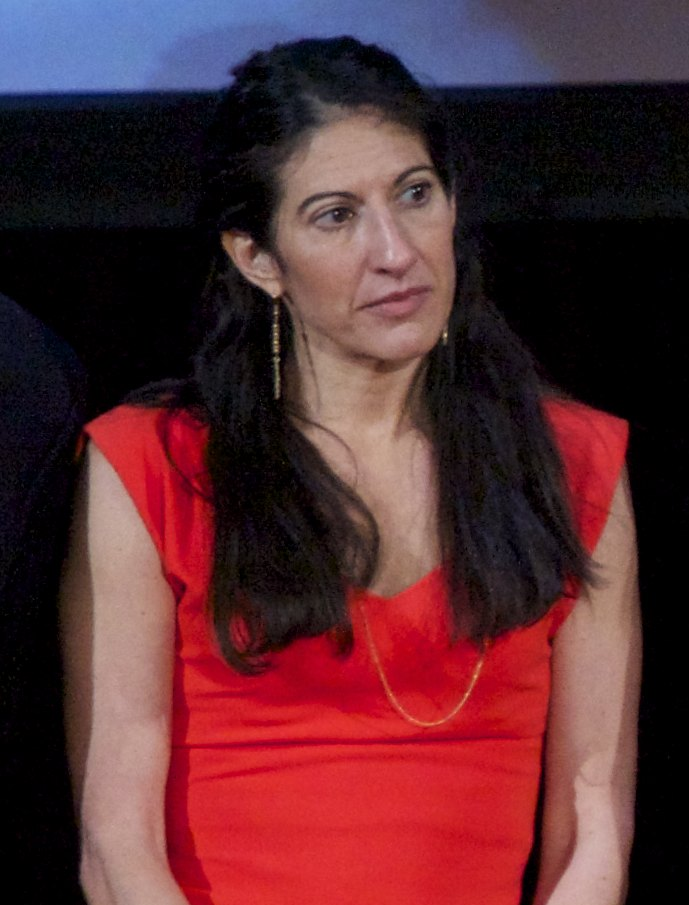
- Dretzin at the 2014 Peabody Awards for The African Americans: Many Rivers to Cross
- Education: Yale University
- Occupation: Documentary film director
- Years active: 1993–present
- Parent: Joanna Merlin (mother)
- Relatives: Julie Dretzin (sister)

Rachel Dretzin is an American documentary film director. She has produced and directed episodes of Frontline (1993–2011), and has directed and produced the documentary series Keep Sweet: Pray and Obey (2022) and Trust Me: The False Prophet (2026), for Netflix. Dretzin is the recipient of two News & Documentary Emmy Awards and has received nominations for an Independent Spirit Award, Cinema Eye Honors and IDA Awards.

== Early life ==
Dretzin graduated from Yale University, where she majored in history.

== Career ==
Dretzin began her career by producing and directing episodes of Frontline for PBS. The October 1999 episode directed and produced by Dretzin, The Lost Children of Rockdale County, which focused on an outbreak of syphilis among teenagers in Atlanta, won a Peabody Award.

In 1996, Dretzin co-founded the production company Ark Media alongside Barak Goodman. Dretzin has served as a producer on various projects produced by the company including Finding Your Roots for PBS, Great Photo Lovely Life and Seen & Heard: The History of Black Television for HBO.

Dretzin was senior producer of the 2013 television documentary series The African Americans: Many Rivers to Cross, written and presented by Henry Louis Gates Jr. and first aired on PBS, winning a Peabody Award among other accolades.

In 2017, Dretzin directed the documentary feature Far from the Tree, an adaptation of the non-fiction book of the same name by Andrew Solomon, focusing on parents of children who have down syndrome, dwarfism and autism, and had its world premiere at DOC NYC, and acquired by Sundance Selects.

Dretzin has directed and executive produced various projects for Netflix including Who Killed Malcolm X? alongside Phil Bertelsen and Keep Sweet: Pray and Obey, focusing on the Fundamentalist Church of Jesus Christ of Latter-Day Saints and its leader Warren Jeffs. In 2026, Dretzin directed a companion series Trust Me: The False Prophet, following cult expert Dr. Christine Marie and her husband Tolga Katas who immersed themselves in FLDS culture and collected evidence against Samuel Bateman, who claims to be the successor of Jeffs.

== Personal life ==
Rachel Dretzin is the daughter of actress and casting director Joanna Merlin (1931–2023), and the sister of actress Julie Dretzin.
