= Man from Plains =

- Theatrical release poster
- Directed by: Jonathan Demme
- Written by: Jonathan Demme
- Produced by: Neda Armian
- Starring: Jimmy Carter; Rosalynn Carter
- Cinematography: Declan Quinn
- Edited by: Kate Amend
- Music by: Djamel Benyelles; Alejandro Escovedo Florent Prabel
- Production company: Participant Productions
- Distributed by: Sony Pictures Classics
- Release date: September 7, 2007 (Venice Film Festival)
- Running time: 120 minutes
- Country: United States
- Language: English
- Box office: $108,807

Man from Plains (originally titled He Comes in Peace) is a 2007 American documentary film written and directed by Jonathan Demme, which chronicles former President of the United States Jimmy Carter's book tour across America to publicize his book Palestine: Peace Not Apartheid. For the book promotion, Carter grants interviews to selected newspapers, magazines, and television shows, such as CNN, PBS, Air America Radio, NPR, Chicago Life, Los Angeles Times, and The Tonight Show with Jay Leno.

== Festival screenings ==
Man from Plains debuted at the Toronto International Film Festival on September 10, 2007. The film won 3 awards at the 2007 Venice Film Festival: FIPRESCI Prize, EIUC Award and Biografilm Award.

== Reception ==
=== Box office ===
The film grossed $108,807.

=== Critical response ===
On the review aggregator website Rotten Tomatoes, 80% of 83 critics' reviews are positive, with an average rating of 6.8/10. The website's consensus reads: "Man From Plains is a fascinating look at the former president's recent endeavors." Metacritic, which uses a weighted average, assigned the film a score of 58 out of 100, based on 22 critics, indicating "mixed or average" reviews.

== See also ==
- List of American films of 2007
