= Trust Me: The False Prophet =

American documentary series

- Release poster
- Genre: Documentary
- Directed by: Rachel Dretzin
- Opening theme: Lola Blanc
- Country of origin: United States
- Original language: English
- No. of episodes: 4

Production
- Executive producers: Rachel Dretzin; Zach Herrmann; Tolga Katas; Dorin Razam; Jeff Skoll; Courtney Sexton; Miura Kite
- Producer: Jamila Ephron
- Cinematography: Elise Coker; Tolga Katas
- Production companies: Ark Media; Participant

Original release
- Network: Netflix
- Release: April 8, 2026

Trust Me: The False Prophet is a 2026 American documentary series directed and executive produced by Rachel Dretzin. It follows cult expert Christine Marie and her videographer husband, Tolga Katas, as they immerse themselves in a Fundamentalist Church of Jesus Christ of Latter-Day Saints community in Utah, discovering disturbing evidence about Samuel Bateman, who claims to be the successor to Warren Jeffs.

The documentary series premiered on April 8, 2026 on Netflix consisting of four episodes.

== Premise ==
Dr. Christine Marie and her husband Tolga Katas relocate to the Short Creek Community, which comprises Hildale, Utah and Colorado City, Arizona. She initially aims to work with members of the Fundamental Church of Jesus Christ of Latter Day Saints amid the chaos following the arrest of the church’s leader Warren Jeffs. After discovering the emergence of a new self proclaimed prophet, Samuel Bateman, she infiltrates his group to build a case against Bateman due to the revelation of child sexual abuse within his family. Marie works with the Colorado City/Hilldale Police Department and later the F.B.I, which leads to the conviction of Bateman.

== Production ==
Dr. Christine Marie and Tolga Katas moved to Short Creek Community after previously helping the town following a flash flood. Afterwards, the two were drawn to continue helping the community and founded a charity called Voices for Dignity. During this time, Marie met Samuel Bateman, who would go on to declare himself a prophet and successor to Warren Jeffs. Marie and others attempted to inform the authorities, but were told they needed concrete evidence. She and Katas collected audio and video evidence by convincing Bateman he was participating in a documentary revolving around FLDS culture. Alongside filmmaker Elise Coker, the couple captured hours of footage, including some of Bateman admitting to abusing women and children.

Rachel Dretzin, director of the FLDS Netflix documentary Keep Sweet: Pray and Obey, offered to direct the project after meeting with Marie and Katas and reviewing their footage.

== Reception ==
On the review aggregator website Rotten Tomatoes, the series holds an approval rating of 100%, based on eight reviews.
