= State 194 (film) =

- Theatrical release poster
- Directed by: Dan Setton
- Written by: Dan Setton
- Produced by: Dan Setton; Elise Pearlstein
- Cinematography: Hanna Abu Saada; Yoram Millo
- Edited by: Brian Johnson; Ariel Setton
- Music by: Michael Brook
- Production companies: SET Productions; Zadig Productions
- Distributed by: Participant Media
- Release dates: September 10, 2012 (Toronto Int'l Film Festival); May 17, 2013 (United States)
- Running time: 98 minutes
- Countries: Israel; Palestinian Territories; United States
- Languages: English; Arabic; Hebrew

State 194 is a 2012 documentary film about the pursuit for Palestinian statehood. The film is written, directed, and produced by Israeli filmmaker Dan Setton. The film premiered at the Toronto International Film Festival on September 10, 2012. It had a limited release in theaters in the United States on May 17, 2013.

== Synopsis ==
The documentary follows the plan that Palestinian Prime Minister Salam Fayyad puts forth in 2009 for the Palestinians to achieve statehood. It follows the progress made by the Palestinians but also "the political quagmire" that threatens the progress. The documentary shows the following people:

- Salam Fayyad, Palestinian Prime Minister from June 15, 2007 to April 13, 2013
- Mahmoud Abbas, President of the Palestinian National Authority from January 15, 2005 to present
- Majd Biltaji, a Palestinian blogger from the West Bank
- Mahmoud El-Mandawi, a Palestinian blogger from Gaza and Biltaji's friend
- Nabeel Sweety, a Palestinian member of The Parents Circle-Families Forum whose sister was killed
- Ron Dermer, senior advisor to Benjamin Netanyahu, Prime Minister of Israel
- Tzipi Livni, Israeli Opposition Leader from 2009 to 2012
- Avi Dichter, former Minister of Israeli Internal Security
- Yitzhak Frankenthal, founder of The Parents Circle-Families Forum
- Sara Benninga, an activist of the Palestine Solidarity Movement
- George Mitchell, former American Senator who wrote the "Mitchell Report"
- Jeremy Ben-Ami, founder of J Street
- Robert Serry, Middle East envoy for the United Nations

== Production ==
The film is directed by Dan Setton and produced by Setton and Elise Pearlstein. Setton heard Palestinian Prime Minister Salam Fayyad make a radio address in 2009 and thought that Fayyad's plan to build social services and economic infrastructure was a similar path to the Zionist movement that led to the creation of Israel. Setton met Fayyad in 2009 shortly before the filmmakers began filming the documentary. He began filming with the support of the French company Zagib Productions. He soon approached Participant Media for backing, and the company expanded the film's production and advised the filmmaker to increase its scope. They attached producer Elise Pearlstein to work with Setton. Filming took place in several cities in the West Bank, including Ramallah. They featured two Palestinian bloggers, Madj Biltaji from the West Bank, and Mahmoud El-Madawi from Gaza, to show grassroots activists using social networks.

Pearlstein said the filmmakers did not know the outcome of Fayyad's plan, "We were trying to make sure the film served as a historical documentation of the time when change felt really possible." They sought to show nonviolent images of the conflict: "There's no blood in this film. It's all about the constructive building of institutions and a political movement." Setton said of the conflict's complex reality, "We tried to make it as clear as possible for the many underinformed people that are in our audience." The filmmakers used aerial shots and wide shots for the documentary; Setton said, "We thought it would be a good cinematic approach to rise up from the day-to-day little things and show a bigger picture."

Salam Fayyad resigned in April 2013, a month before the documentary's theatrical release. When the Los Angeles Times asked Setton about Fayyad's resignation affecting the prospects of statehood, the director said, "There was a loss of momentum even before his resignation. I’ve spoken with him recently, and he said he resigned his job but he hasn’t resigned his mission. He will push Palestinians to continue working on what he believes will create the conditions of statehood."

== Release ==
State 194 premiered at the Toronto International Film Festival on September 10, 2012. The Palestinian Prime Minister depicted in the documentary, Salam Fayyad, was scheduled to appear at a news conference at the film festival with Setton, producer Elise Pearlstein, and representatives of The Parents Circle-Families Forum, but Sallah was detained in Ramallah when demonstrations broke out among Palestinians over high prices in the occupied territories. The documentary also screened at the Berlin International Film Festival on February 8, 2013. It had a limited release on May 17, 2013 in theaters in New York City and Los Angeles.

== Reception ==
Mark Adams of Screen Daily reviewed State 194 at its Berlin screening and called it "a highly watchable and impressively optimistic documentary". He spoke of its distribution potential, "The film... is made with enthusiasm and passion, and would be a suitably provocative and challenging transmission for broadcasters. Technical qualities are okay, but this is the sort of project where content and context are everything."

Anita Gates, reviewing for The New York Times, called State 194 "an intelligent, evenhanded Israeli documentary". Gates compared the film to a 60 Minutes TV segment "without the confrontational interview style". For her, the film's different elements "lay out the situation but offer little new insight". She said, "Sadly, the overall effect of 'State 194' is a fresh wave of frustration and discouragement over a heartbreaking and seemingly insurmountable political standoff and its human toll." Gary Goldstein of the Los Angeles Times said, "This globe-hopping film offers an easily digestible look at the Israeli-Palestinian conflict, past and present, while framing the roles of its recent key players." Goldstein said the film focused on "the seemingly level-headed, optimistic Fayyad" as he pushes for statehood. He concluded, "With a two-state solution still elusive, 'State 194' may feel a bit like yesterday's news – literally and figuratively. But as an aid to better understanding this vital, complex dispute, the film is definitely worth a look."

Mike D'Angelo of The A.V. Club said the documentary was unnecessary for moviegoers who have a basic understanding of the Israeli–Palestinian conflict. D'Angelo said, "As a primer, however, the film does the job, albeit less thoroughly and with more needless digressions than would even a lengthy magazine article on the subject." The critic thought the documentary easily summarized Fayyad's plan and spent too much time recording the prime minister at photo ops. D'Angelo said, "Ultimately, State 194 wants to rally viewers to the cause of a two-state solution, and that entails glossing over many of the reasons why it hasn't already happened, in spite of it being in almost everybody’s best interest."
