= Angels in the Dust =

- Directed by: Louise Hogarth
- Release date: 2007
- Running time: 95 minutes
- Country: South Africa
- Language: English

Angels in the Dust is a 2007 South African documentary film by filmmaker Louise Hogarth. The film follows Marion Cloete, a university-trained therapist who leaves behind her life of privilege in Johannesburg to build Boikarabelo, a village and school that provides orphaned children with shelter, food and education. The stories of the orphaned children are paralleled with the orphaned elephants of Pilanesberg National Park in South Africa.

== Reception ==
Angels in the Dust won the 2007 Emerging Pictures/Full Frame Audience Award at the Full Frame Documentary Film Festival. It also won an Audience Award at the Encounters South African International Documentary Festival in 2008. It is produced by Dream Out Loud Films and Participant Productions.
