= Maryam (2002 film) =

- Directed by: Ramin Serry
- Written by: Ramin Serry
- Produced by: Shauna Lyon; Cyrus Serry; Jonathan Shoemaker; Derrick Tseng
- Edited by: Ahrin Mishan
- Music by: Gary Levy
- Production companies: Centre Street; Streetlight Films
- Distributed by: Streetlight Films
- Release date: 2002
- Running time: 87 minutes
- Country: United States
- Language: English

Maryam is a 2002 film about a young woman who is an Iranian immigrant living in the United States at the time of the Iran hostage crisis. The film was written and directed by Ramin Serry. Mariam Parris plays the young woman. The film also features Shaun Toub as her father, Shohreh Aghdashloo as her mother, and David Ackert as her cousin, Ali, who becomes an Islamic fundamentalist.

Maryam was featured in the third Roger Ebert's Overlooked Film Festival in 2001.

The word "Maryam" is the Aramaic name of Mary, the mother of Jesus and means the same in Persian language. Maryam also means Tuberose in Persian and is a common first name in Iran.
