= Boikarabelo =

Rural community in South Africa

- Location within Gauteng Location within South Africa
- Coordinates: 25.931°S 27.464°E
- Country: South Africa
- Province: Gauteng
- District: West Rand
- Municipality: Mogale City
- Time zone: UTC+2 (SAST)

Boikarabelo is a rural community located in Magaliesburg, South Africa dedicated to helping and providing a home for economic and AIDS orphans and the poor. The site includes an orphanage, school, medical clinic and village. It was founded in 1990. Boikarabelo (formerly Botshabelo Community Development Trust, Magaliesburg) was featured in the documentary film Angels in the Dust.

Because of the current epidemic of HIV in South Africa it is home to hundreds of AIDS and economic orphans.
