= Participant (company) =

Defunct American film production company

Participant Media, LLC
- Trade name: Participant
- Formerly: Participant Productions (2004–2008); Participant Media (2008–2019)
- Industry: Film; Television
- Founded: January 2004; 22 years ago
- Founder: Jeffrey Skoll
- Defunct: April 16, 2024; 2 years ago
- Fate: Dissolved
- Headquarters: Los Angeles, California, United States
- Area served: Worldwide
- Key people: Jeffrey Skoll (Chairman); David Linde (Chief Executive Officer); Gabriel Brakin (Chief Operating Officer); Andy Kim (Chief Financial Officer); Diane Weyermann (Chief Content Officer)
- Products: Feature films Television series
- Services: Film production; Television production
- Website: Official website

Participant Media, LLC was an American independent film and television production company founded in 2004 by Jeffrey Skoll, dedicated to entertainment intended to spur social change. The company financed and co-produced film and television content, as well as digital entertainment through its subsidiary SoulPancake, which the company acquired in 2016.

The company was originally named Participant Productions and went on to become a well-known independent financier. The company's name descriptively politicizes its basis on currently topical subjects presented to induce awareness of problematic social aspects.

The company produced, financed, or co-produced 135 films and five television series. Its films have been nominated for 73 Academy Awards, and have won 18, including Best Picture for Green Book and Spotlight.

Participant, which earned B Corp certification in 2017, was the largest company that exclusively produced and financed social impact entertainment.

On April 16, 2024, Skoll announced that the company would be ceasing operations after two decades, with nearly all of its staff being dismissed and development of new content shutting down entirely.

== History ==
=== Founding and early investments ===
The company was founded in January 2004 as Participant Productions by Jeffrey Skoll, the "second employee" of eBay, with $100 million in cash from his personal funds. Its goal was to produce projects that would be both commercially viable and socially relevant.

The corporate logo of Participant from 2004 to 2008, when it was still known as Participant Productions.

Skoll was the company's first chief executive officer, but stepped down in August 2006. The firm's initial plans were to produce four to six films per year, each with a budget of $40 million. It focused on films in six areas – the environment, health care, human rights, institutional responsibility, peace and tolerance, and social and economic justice. It evaluated projects by running them past its creative executives first, only then assessing their cost and commercial viability, and analyzing their social relevance last. Once the decision was made to go ahead with production, the company asked non-profit organizations to build campaigns around the release. In some cases, the studio has spent years creating positive word-of-mouth with advocacy groups, which are often encouraged to use the film to push their own agendas.

The new company quickly announced an ambitious slate of productions. Its first film was the drama film American Gun (2005), with equity partner IFC Films. Two weeks later, the company announced a co-production deal with Warner Bros. on two films – the geopolitical thriller film Syriana (2005) and the drama film Class Action (later re-titled North Country) (2005). Participant Productions contributed half the budget of each film. Its fourth production, a documentary film, was announced in November 2004. Titled The World According to Sesame Street (2005), the film examined the impact of the children's television show Sesame Street on world culture, focusing on Kosovo, Bangladesh, South Africa and El Salvador. At the same time, the company began to implement an environmentally friendly strategy: Syriana was the company's first carbon-neutral production, and the company created carbon offsets for the documentary film An Inconvenient Truth (2006).

=== First films and financial problems, maturing growth ===
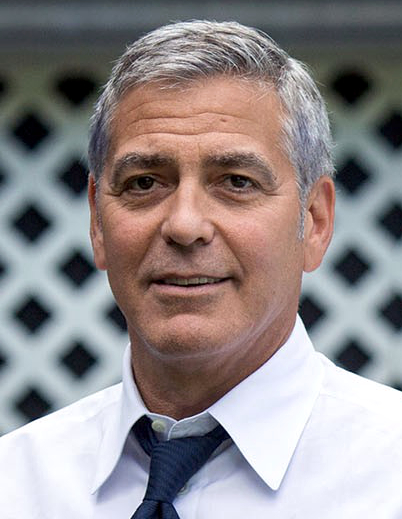
Actor George Clooney, won the Academy Award for Best Supporting Actor on March 5, 2006, for his role in the company's geopolitical thriller film Syriana (2005).

In 2005, the company suffered its first stumble. It again agreed to co-finance a picture with Warner Bros., Vadim Perelman's second feature, Truce. Although Perelman claimed he had "never been moved by a script to such an extent", the film never went into production. North Country did poorly at the box office despite recent Academy Award-winner Charlize Theron in the lead. The World According to Sesame Street never found a distributor for theatrical release, and eventually only aired on PBS television, Sesame Street's broadcast home.

The company announced in March 2005 that it would executive produce the Warner Bros. drama film Good Night, and Good Luck. At the Cannes Film Festival in May, the company bought the right to distribute the forthcoming drama film Fast Food Nation (2006) directed by Richard Linklater in North America in return for an equity stake. A month later, it bought distribution rights to the documentary Murderball in return for an equity stake. It also executive produced and co-financed Al Gore's global-warming documentary, An Inconvenient Truth.

As heavier production scheduling grew, the company added staff. Ricky Strauss was named the first president in March 2005, with oversight of production, marketing and business development. Attorney and former non-profit chief executive Meredith Blake was hired in June as its Senior Vice President of Corporate and Community Affairs, to oversee development of awareness and outreach campaigns around the social issues raised in the company's films in cooperation with non-profit organizations, corporations, and earned media. Diane Weyermann, director of the Sundance Institute's Documentary Film Program, joined the company in October 2005 as Executive Vice President of Documentary Production.

The company's non-film-production efforts continued to grow. The company provided an undisclosed amount of financing in February 2005 to film distributor Emerging Pictures to finance that company's national network of digitally equipped cinemas (with Emerging Pictures distributing Participant's films). The company also began its first socially relevant outreach project, helping to finance screenings of the biographical film Gandhi (1982) in the Palestinian territories for the first time as well as in the countries of Israel, Jordan, Lebanon and Syria. In support of its upcoming film, An Inconvenient Truth, the studio negotiated a deal for distributor Paramount Classics to donate five percent of its U.S. domestic theatrical gross box-office receipts (with a guarantee of $500,000) to the Alliance for Climate Protection.

The company had a very successful 2005 awards season, with eleven Academy Award nominations and one win. Good Night, and Good Luck garnered six nominations, including Best Art Direction, Best Cinematography, Best Director (George Clooney), Best Picture, Best Actor in a Leading Role (David Strathairn) and Best Original Screenplay. Murderball was nominated for Best Documentary Feature. North Country was nominated for Best Actress in a Leading Role (Charlize Theron) and Best Actress in a Supporting Role (Frances McDormand). Syriana was nominated for Best Actor in a Supporting Role (George Clooney) and Best Original Screenplay. But of the eleven nominations, only George Clooney won for Best Actor in a Supporting Role in Syriana.

=== Film line-up addition and continued growth ===
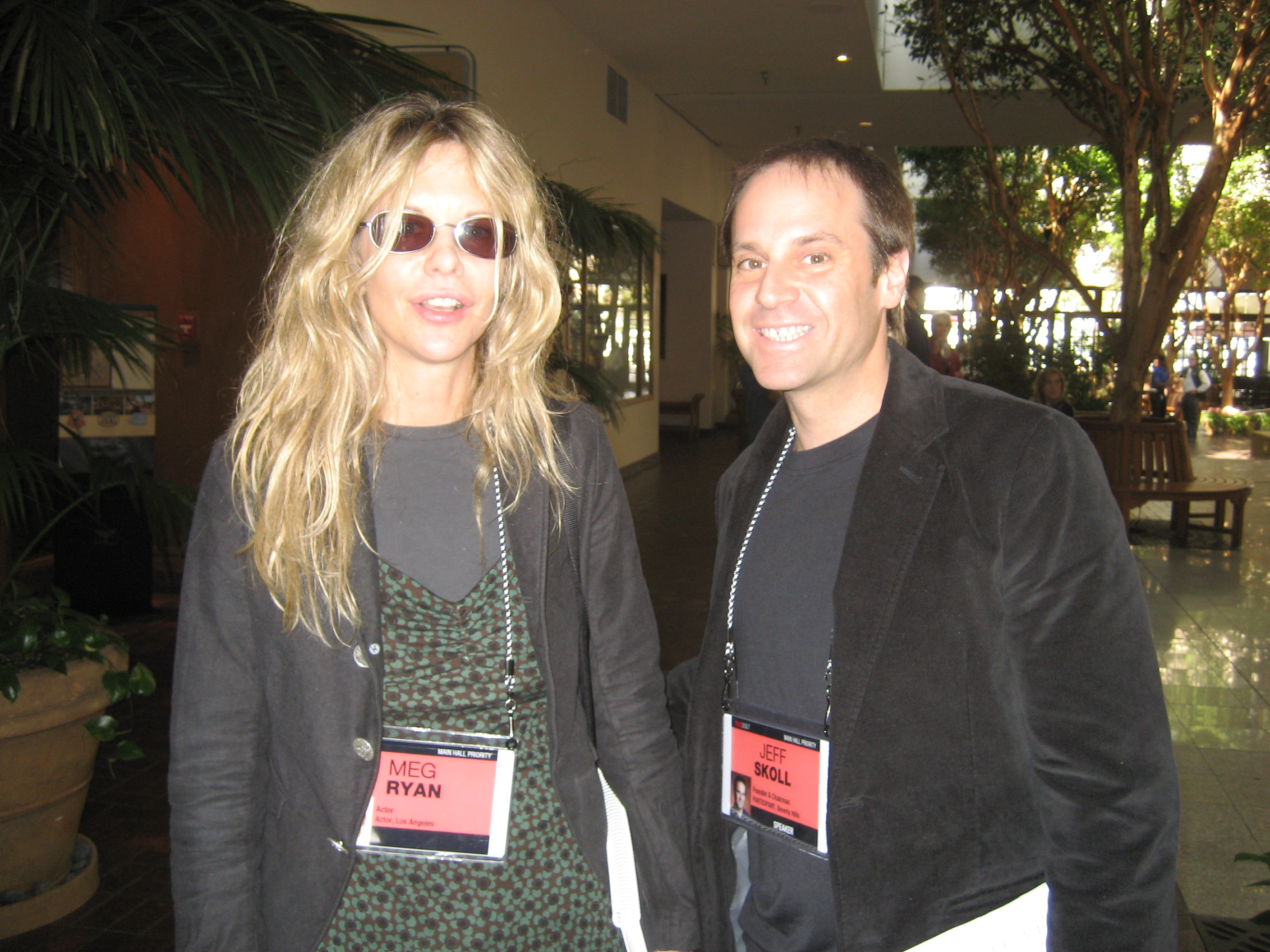
Jeffrey Skoll (pictured with actress Meg Ryan in 2007), founder and chief executive officer of Participant Media, stepped down in 2006 after appointing James Berk to be chief executive officer.

In June, the company announced it would partner with New Line Cinema (a subsidiary of Warner Bros.) to produce The Crusaders, a drama about Brown v. Board of Education of Topeka, 347 U.S. 483 (1954), a landmark ruling of the Supreme Court of the United States which ended racial segregation in public schools. But the film never got beyond the development stage. In September, the company entered into an agreement to co-produce the drama film The Visitor (2008) with Groundswell Productions, and two months later agreed to co-produce (with Sony Pictures Classics) a documentary film about the Abu Ghraib torture scandal, Standard Operating Procedure (2008), directed by Errol Morris.

The company also took an equity position in and a co-production credit for Chicago 10 (2007), an animated documentary film about the 1969 Chicago Seven conspiracy trial.

Finally, in December, the company agreed to finance and produce the documentary film Man from Plains (2007), directed by Jonathan Demme, that followed former U.S. President Jimmy Carter as he promoted his political-science book, Palestine: Peace Not Apartheid (2006).

The company also co-financed, with Warner Independent Pictures, the documentary film Darfur Now (2007), and, with Universal Studios and others, co-financed the biographical film Charlie Wilson's War (2007). The film had the biggest budget of any of the company's films since Syriana.

Three major corporate events also occurred in 2006.

- In September, Skoll stepped down as the company's chief executive officer and was replaced by James Berk, the founding executive director of the National Academy of Recording Arts and Sciences Foundation and former president and chief executive officer of Hard Rock Cafe International. Berk's duties included daily operations and management, earned media efforts and corporate branding.
- In December, the company won its first significant award when the Producers Guild of America presented the 2007 Stanley Kramer Award to An Inconvenient Truth.
- The company was also one of the backers in April 2006 which invested $1 billion in Summit Entertainment, allowing that company to restructure itself as a full-fledged film studio. This did not become known, however, for near three years.

The company's success continued through the 2006 awards season. An Inconvenient Truth was nominated for an Academy Award for Best Documentary Feature, and the song "I Need to Wake Up" (by Melissa Etheridge) nominated for an Academy Award for Best Original Song. The film and song won their respective categories in February 2007.

Corporate growth continued in 2007. On January 8, the company hired motion-picture marketing veterans Buffy Shutt and Kathy Jones, both Executive Vice President of Marketing, to coordinate marketing of the company's films. Eight days later, the company hired Tony Award- and Emmy Award-winning event producer John Schreiber as Executive Vice President of Social Action and Advocacy to enhance the company's earned media, non-profit and corporate outreach and advocacy campaigns.

February saw the hire of Adrian Sexton as Executive Vice President to oversee digital and global media projects, and April saw veteran production head Jonathan King join the company as Executive Vice President of Production. Lynn Hirshfield was hired in May as Vice President of Business Development to launch the company's publishing division, and saw Bonnie Abaunza and Liana Schwarz both Vice President of Social Action Campaign Development and Operations to assist with social outreach and advocacy campaigns in mid-June.

In November, the company signed a deal with actress Natalie Portman's newly formed production company, Handsomecharlie Films, under which the two studios would co-produce socially relevant films for a two-year period. No films were produced under this agreement, however. The same month, the company hired veteran Showtime producer John Moser to oversee development and production of original programs for television and home cable. But despite the management activity and expansion, not all of the company's films did well. Chicago 10 did not sell for several months after it premiered at Sundance, and only significant editing and a reduction in running time led to a distribution deal.

The company also announced additional productions. In January, it said it was co-financing the drama film The Kite Runner (2007) with Sidney Kimmel Entertainment and DreamWorks Pictures, the latter company then owned by Viacom via Paramount Pictures. The Kite Runner was the first collaboration between both Participant and DreamWorks; the two companies would not collaborate again until The Soloist in 2009. That spring, the company took an equity position in Angels in the Dust (2007), a documentary film about children orphaned by AIDS, and paid the filmmaker to update the film and shoot more footage.

In April, it closed a deal with Warner Independent to turn Randy Shilts' biographical book, The Mayor of Castro Street (1982) into a film, but the project entered development hell, as well as the feature-length documentary about the 2007 Live Earth concert later. Five months later the company agreed (with Broken Lizard) to co-produce and co-finance the company's first comedy film, Taildraggers, revolving around five pilots trying to stop oil extraction from an Alaskan preserve. As of June 2009, however, the film had not been produced.

Participant then signed a co-production deal with State Street Pictures to finance the biographical drama, Bobby Martinez about the eponymous Latino surfer in November. The film entered development hell for nearly two years but hired Ric Roman Waugh to rewrite and direct in April 2009, with supposed production by the beginning of 2012. By the end of 2007, the company was seen as a key player in documentary production.

=== Name change, more political outreach ===
In March 2008, Participant Productions changed its name to Participant Media to reflect the firm's expansion into television and non-traditional entertainment media.

The company continued to expand its social advocacy and outreach efforts in 2008. On January 16, 2008, it joined and made a financial contribution to a $100 million United Nations-sponsored fund which would provide backing for films which combatted religious, ethnic, racial, and other stereotypes. Fueling the company's expansion was the creation of a $250 million fund with Image Nation, a start-up film studio based in the United Arab Emirates which is a division of the Abu Dhabi Media Company. Each company contributed roughly half of the fund's total (although some funding came from loans). Participant and Image Nation agreed to produce 18 films over the next five years, which would add approximately four feature-length films per year to Participant's existing slate. To boost its marketing efforts, the company also hired Jeffrey Sakson as Vice President of Publicity in April 2008. In September 2008, Participant Media and PublicAffairs Books signed a deal under which PublicAffairs would publish four original paperback books designed to expand upon the social messages in Participant's films. The first book to be published under the pact was Food Inc.: A Participant Guide: How Industrial Food Is Making Us Sicker, Fatter, and Poorer—And What You Can Do About It. The company also founded a new Web site, TakePart.com, to promote Participant Media's films as well as make viewers aware of the social advocacy efforts of Participant's outreach partners. In 2009, the company signed a first look deal with Summit Entertainment.

In March, Participant announced a co-financing deal with Tapestry Films to produce Minimum Wage, a comedy about a corrupt corporate executive sentenced to live for a year on a minimum wage salary. It was not produced. A month later, the company announced it and Groundswell Productions were co-financing The Informant!, a comedy directed by Steven Soderbergh and starring Matt Damon about the lysine price-fixing conspiracy at Archer Daniels Midland in the mid-1990s. July saw Participant set up a co-financing deal with three other studios to produce The Colony, an eco-horror film. It, too, was never produced.

The 2007 awards season saw several more Academy Award nominations for the company's films. Its films had a combined seven Golden Globe Award nominations, although it won none. Philip Seymour Hoffman was nominated for his supporting actor role in Charlie Wilson's War, Richard Jenkins was nominated for Best Actor in The Visitor, and Alberto Iglesias was nominated for best original score for The Kite Runner. But the studio won no Oscars that year. The success during awards season did not extend into 2008. The company had only three films released during the year (Every Little Step, Pressure Cooker, and Standard Operating Procedure), and none of them was nominated for an award from a major arts organization. However, on November 19, 2008, the Producers Guild of America gave Participant founder Jeff Skoll its Visionary Award.

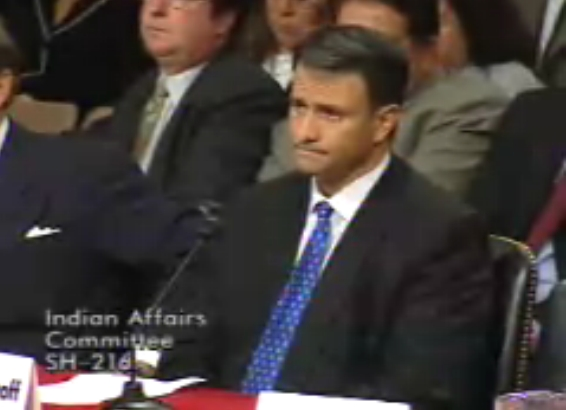
Jack Abramoff (pictured), a lobbyist convicted on charges of fraud and corruption, was the subject of a Participant Media film, Casino Jack and the United States of Money. The role campaign finance and lobbying play in political corruption are among the socially relevant topics Participant Media addresses in its films.

In 2009, it saw the company continue to aggressively produce both feature films and documentaries. In January, it announced that it would produce Paul Dinello's Mr. Burnout (about a burned out teacher seeking to rekindle his love of teaching) and Furry Vengeance (a comedy starring Brendan Fraser about an Oregon real estate developer who is opposed by animals). But only Furry Vengeance was produced. That same month Participant signed a five-year production and distribution deal with Summit Entertainment. The agreement, which covered titles financed by Participant's $250 million production agreement with Imagination Media, was nonexclusive (meaning Participant could seek distribution of films by other companies) and was limited to four projects a year. The agreement allowed Summit to charge a distribution fee, and to co-finance titles if it wished. The pact covered home video and pay-television distribution as well. Furry Vengeance was the first picture produced under the agreement. In April, the company hired screenwriter Miles Chapman to pen an untitled environmentally themed action-adventure script about the hunt for a mystical gem in the heart of Africa. The script went into development hell. The same month, the company agreed to co-finance (with Krasnoff/Foster Entertainment) a biographical drama titled History on Trial—which was intended to document the true story of Deborah Lipstadt, a professor of Jewish studies who was sued by Holocaust deniers David Irving for libel. The film was not produced, but the company did go on to make Denial, starring Rachel Weisz, about the same subject in 2016. The company also announced a number of productions in May 2009, including: The Crazies, a remake of the 1973 film of the same name; Casino Jack and the United States of Money, a film about the Jack Abramoff Indian lobbying scandal; Help Me Spread Goodness, a comedy starring and directed by Ben Stiller about a banking executive who is caught by a Nigerian Internet scam (the film was not produced); and The Soloist, a drama starring Jamie Foxx and Robert Downey, Jr. based on the true story of Nathaniel Ayers, a brilliant musician who develops schizophrenia and becomes homeless.

The company also expanded in non-film production as well. In March, Participant agreed to conduct outreach and social advocacy efforts on behalf of the Lionsgate/Roadside Attractions documentary The Cove about dolphin slaughters by Japanese villagers in a cove near fishing grounds. The firm's TakePart website also released a new iPhone application, Givabit, which solicits charitable donations for Participant Media's nonprofit advocacy partners from iPhone users once a day. In June, the company established a new book publishing subsidiary, headed by Vice President of Publishing Lynn Hirshfield (who changed titles within the company). Liana Schwarz was promoted to Senior Vice President of Campaign Development and Operations.

On January 28, 2010, Participant Media co-presented director Mark Lewis' documentary, Cane Toads: The Conquest at the Sundance Film Festival. The film, according to Daily Variety said, was the "first specialty doc filmed in digital 3D." A month later, Bonnie Stylides left Summit Entertainment to become Participant's Senior Vice-President of Business Affairs. The studio's hit documentary, Waiting for "Superman", garnered media acclaim, and Participant inked a worldwide distribution deal with Paramount shortly before its premiere at Sundance. It also sold North American distribution rights for its documentary, Countdown to Zero, to Magnolia Pictures, and distribution rights to its documentary Climate of Change to Tribeca Film (a division of Robert De Niro's Tribeca Enterprises).

The company also received a $248,000 grant from the Robert Wood Johnson Foundation to raise awareness about access to quality food and childhood obesity. The studio used these funds to create a campaign linked to its promotional efforts for the documentary film Food, Inc. and signed a deal with Active Media to help run the campaign. It signed a deal with Planet Illogica (a website collaboratively produced by artists, filmmakers, musicians, and fashion designers) to generate a social action campaign associated with its documentary Oceans (which was released by Walt Disney Pictures). The "Save My Oceans Tour" involved concerts, art installations, and screenings of Oceans on college campuses.

On April 13, Noah Manduke (former president of the consulting firm Durable Good and president of the marketing firm Siegel + Gale) was named chief strategy officer of the Jeff Skoll Group. Skoll created the Skoll Group to oversee his various enterprises, including Participant Media, and Manduke began working with Skoll and Participant Media's top management to begin a strategic planning process and strengthen collaboration between Participant and Skoll's other organizations and companies. The following month, studio executive James Berk was one of only 180 individuals invited to join the Academy of Motion Picture Arts and Sciences.

Based on the success of its Twilight Saga film series, Summit Entertainment announced on March 8, 2011, that it was making a $750 million debt refinancing with cash distribution to its investors, which included Participant Media.

On June 5, The New York Times ran a major story about the studio, declaring: "Participant Media, the film industry's most visible attempt at social entrepreneurship, turned seven this year without quite sorting out whether a company that trades in movies with a message can earn its way in a business that has been tough even for those who peddle 3-D pandas and such." Author Michael Cieply noted that The Beaver, Participant's latest released, cost $20 million but had garnered just $1 million in gross box-office sales after a month in theaters – making the film a "flop". The company's biggest success to date, the newspaper noted, was 2007's Charlie Wilson's War ($66.7 million in gross domestic box office revenue). Skoll was quoted as saying that he had poured "hundreds of millions to date [into the company], with much more to follow", and that the studio had yet to break even. Skoll and Berk, however, noted that Participant Media performs slightly above-average when compared to similarly sized peers. The advantage came in three areas: home video sales, the company's long-term attempts to build social movements around its films, and its stake in Summit Entertainment (which allowed it to win more favorable distribution terms).

The Times said that audiences may be turned off by Participant's relentless focus on upsetting issues, quoting unnamed sources. The company hoped that it would change this attitude about its films (and make money) with 2011's The Help (about racial reconciliation in the American South during the 1960s) and Contagion (a Steven Soderbergh picture about the outbreak of a virulent, deadly disease). Skoll also said that Participant had purchased the rights to a New York Times article about the Deepwater Horizon oil spill of 2010, and that the film would likely focus not simply on oil drilling, but on a number of critical issues, such as climate change and the ecological health of oceans.

By year's end, however, there was less concern about the company's financial future. The studio's $25 million film about racial reconciliation (about a third of the production budget came from Participant), The Help, cleared $100 million in late August, and was just short of $200 million worldwide by late December. The Help was the first film since 2010's Inception to be number one at the North American box office for three straight weekends in a row, and was only unseated by another Participant Media film, Contagion. The Help was nominated for four Academy Awards: The film for Best Picture, Viola Davis for Best Actress, and Jessica Chastain and Octavia Spencer for Best Supporting Actress. Spencer won the Oscar for her role.

Participant executives said on October 14, 2011, that the studio would expand its production to make seven to twelve films per year, would begin producing features and series for television, and would expand its online presence. As part of this plan, in November the studio hired advertising executive Chad Boettcher to be executive vice president for social action and advocacy and 20th Century Fox executive Gary Frenkel to be senior vice president for digital products and communities.

In January 2012, Participant Media made its first investment in a non-English-language film, the forthcoming Pablo Larraín motion picture No (starring Gael Garcia Bernal). The semi-biographical film tells the story of a man who initiates an upbeat, innocuous advertising campaign that helps to unseat Chilean dictator General Augusto Pinochet during the 1988 plebiscite that led to the Chilean transition to democracy. The same month, however, it lost its president, Ricky Strauss, who departed the studio to become head of worldwide marketing at Walt Disney Pictures.

Three weeks later, on February 2, 2012, Participant Media announced that it was partnering with Summit Entertainment, Image Nation, Spanish production company Apaches Entertainment, and Colombian production company Dynamo to produce a supernatural horror film about an American oil company executive who moves his family into a house in a small city in Colombia, only to find the home is haunted. The company announced that Spanish director Luis Quilez would direct from a script by Alex and David Pastor (who developed their script with funding from Participant).

On April 16, Participant formed Participant Television, its television division, naming Evan Shapiro as president. Participant also took an equity stake in Cineflix Media Canada-based TV producer and distributor. In December, Participant continued its move into television with the purchase of the Documentary Channel (USA) and Halogen TV's distribution assets to be combined into a new cable channel within its TV division.

On January 10, 2013, Participant Media's Lincoln received 12 Academy Award nominations. These included Best Picture, Best Director (Steven Spielberg), Best Actor (Daniel Day-Lewis), Best Supporting Actress (Sally Field), and Best Adapted Screenplay (Tony Kushner).

The following month, Participant Media launched a Latin American production division, Participant PanAmerica, to co-finance Spanish-language films with Mexican producers. The plan calls for 12 films to be made under this division over a five-year period.

Participant Media's new millennial targeted cable channel, Pivot, launched on August 1, 2013.

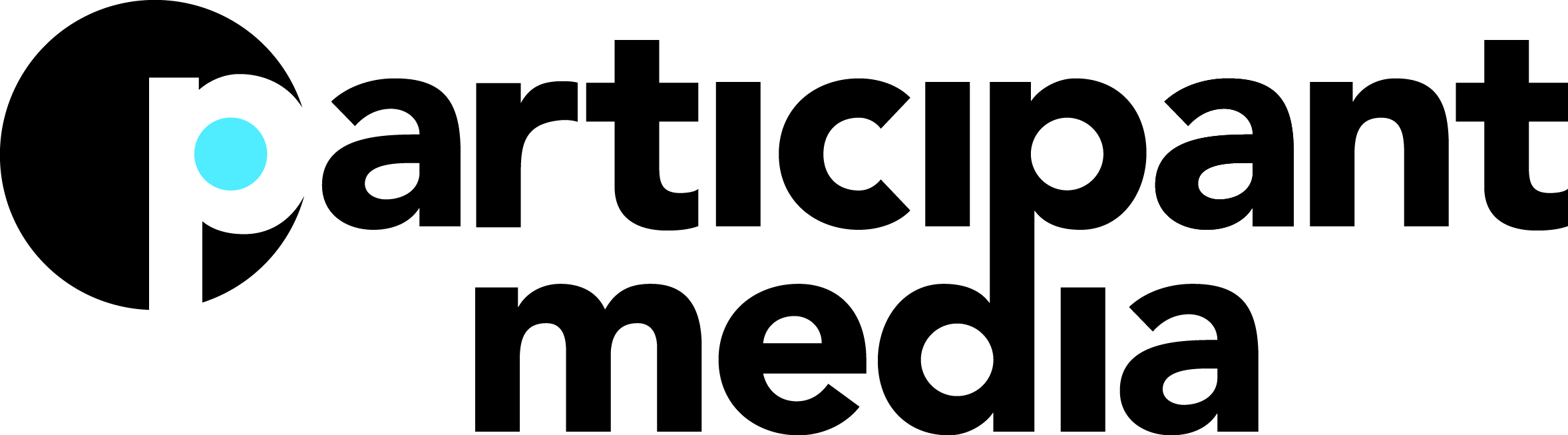
Former Participant Media logo used from 2014 to 2019

In December 2014, US Senator Tom Udall introduced a Senate resolution that would call on all relevant US agencies to locate and declassify and make public all documents concerning the mass killings in Indonesia, a process buoyed forward by the release of The Act of Killing and Participant's The Look of Silence, both Academy Award nominated documentaries directed by Joshua Oppenheimer.

On January 24, 2015, its documentary 3 ½ Minutes', Ten Bullets premiered at the Sundance Film Festival and won the U.S. Documentary Special Jury Award for Social Impact.

On February 22, 2015, the company won the Academy Award for Best Feature Documentary with the film CITIZENFOUR.

On March 21, 2015, Participant's documentary The Look of Silence won the Audience Award: Festival Favorites category at the South by Southwest Film Festival. CITIZENFOUR, The Great Invisible, Ivory Tower, and The Unknown Known were nominated for a total of seven 2015 Primetime Emmy Awards. CITIZENFOUR won for Exceptional Merit in Documentary Film.

=== David Linde leads as CEO ===
On October 13, 2015, the company announced David Linde joined Participant as CEO.

On December 16, 2015, the company and Steven Spielberg with Reliance Entertainment and Entertainment One created Amblin Partners.

On February 4, 2016, Spotlight screened at the Vatican for their newly formed commission on Sex Abuse which was set up in 2014 to find ways to protect children from sex abuse during their 2016 3-day meeting. Pete Saunders, a survivor who was appointed to the Pontifical Commission for the Protection of Minors and who arranged the February 4 screening, was asked to take a leave of absence shortly thereafter. Shortly after winning multiple Oscars, including Best Picture, the Vatican's newspaper praised Spotlight for exposing these abuses. The film, however, did face controversy including some criticism from an author of The New York Times calling it, "a misrepresentation of how the Church dealt with sexual abuse cases", arguing that the movie's biggest flaw was its failure to portray psychologists who had assured Church officials that abusive priests could be safely returned to ministry after undergoing therapy treatments. Another criticism was that the film falsely portrayed Jack Dunn, the public relations head and a member of the board at Boston College High School, as a member of the Boston Archdiocesan cover-up (for which the dialogue itself was mythologised).

On February 28, 2016, the company won its first Best Picture Academy Award for Spotlight. The acclaimed drama also picked up the Oscar for Best Original Screenplay (Tom McCarthy and Josh Singer). Also in February 2016, the company's films The Look of Silence and Beasts of No Nation won a total of three Independent Spirit Awards.

On October 13, 2016, the company acquired SoulPancake, a short-form and digital brand, for a price which are yet to be disclosed as of 2024. On October 31, 2016, the company shut down TV network Pivot due to low ratings and small viewing audiences. At the end of 2016, the company shut down TakePart as part of a shifting strategy.

On January 10, 2017, Participant announced its partnership with Lionsgate to distribute films internationally. Soon after, the company's film Deepwater Horizon was nominated for two Academy Awards in 2017. Later that same year, Participant Media released its film Wonder on November 17. The film, starring Jacob Tremblay, Owen Wilson and Julia Roberts, became Participant's highest-grossing film at the worldwide box office.

In 2018, the company's film The Post was nominated for two Academy Awards, Wonder was nominated for one Academy Award, and Participant's A Fantastic Woman won the Academy Award for Best Foreign Language Film. A Fantastic Woman was credited with helping to change laws in Chile that would give rights to transgender people and transgender actress Daniela Vega was celebrated as a national hero. That same year, Participant's film Roma was named Best Picture by the Los Angeles Film Critics Association and the New York Film Critics Circle. The film also won the Golden Lion for Best Film at the Venice Film Festival. The company's film Green Book was named Best Film by the National Board of Review and won the People's Choice Award at the Toronto International Film Festival. In 2018, Participant Media also expanded its virtual reality experience, "Melting Ice" featuring Al Gore, into a four-part series titled, This is Climate Change.

In 2019, Participant received a company-record 17 Academy Award nominations including ten for Roma, five for Green Book and two for RBG. Of those 17 nominations, the company won six Oscars including Best Picture for Green Book and Best Director and Best Foreign Language Film for Roma.

The success of Roma led to a cultural moment in 2019 called the "Roma Effect," which helped increase visibility and raise awareness for domestic workers in the U.S. and Mexico, where the Mexican Congress voted to pass legislation granting domestic workers access to basic labor rights, such as limited work hours and paid vacation. That year, then-Senator Kamala Harris and Representative Pramila Jayapal introduced the National Domestic Workers Bill of Rights into the US Congress.

In collaboration with the UCLA School of Theater, Film and Television's Skoll Center for Social Impact Entertainment, Participant published the "State of SIE" report, similar to what it had done a few years earlier with USC when it published the "Participant Index" report. These reports are rare exceptions to Participant Media usually keeping its impact strategies proprietary.

On September 8, 2019, Participant debuted its rebrand and logo at the Toronto Film Festival which coincided with the company's 15th anniversary. The company's rebrand was followed by the announcement that David Linde extended his contract as CEO of the consumer-engaged brand with a multi-year deal.

Participant's 2019 film Dark Waters, starring Mark Ruffalo in the true story of a corporate defense lawyer waging an environmental lawsuit against a chemical giant, and Participant's accompanying impact campaign influenced water protection legislation at the state and federal level in the U.S., as well as the E.U.’s pledge to ban “forever chemicals” in 2020 and 43 multinational companies’ pledges to stop selling them. Via the Dark Waters campaign, Mark Ruffalo became an outspoken advocate against forever chemicals. He testified in front of Congress about the harms of PFAS and met with North Carolina government officials to ask for stronger action. In 2024, the United States Environmental Protection Agency announced a first-ever drinking water standard to limit forever chemicals and Mark Ruffalo issued a statement saying to the communities affected by pollution: “Your voices have been heard."

On November 30, 2020, Participant terminated its equity stake in Amblin Partners, ending its relationship with the company.

In March 2021, Collective directed by Alexander Nanau became the second film nominated in both the Best International Feature and Best Documentary categories for the 93rd Academy Awards.

Laura Poitras’ documentary All the Beauty and the Bloodshed became the second documentary in the history of the Venice Film Festival to win the Golden Lion in September of 2021. Participant's impact campaign for the Academy Award-nominated 2022 documentary, about artist and activist Nan Goldin's personal fight to hold the Sackler family accountable for the opioid crisis, raised more than $130,000 for harm reduction organizations.

In October 2021, after a two-year delay due to the Coronavirus pandemic, Participant's 15th anniversary was celebrated at the Museum of Modern Art (MoMA) with a retrospective screening of 15 of the company's films, entitled “Participant at MoMA: Film and Activism.”

In November 2021, Participant was honored with the inaugural Power of Cinema Award from the American Cinematheque.

In February 2022, Participant's animated documentary Flee, directed by Jonas Poher Rasmussen, about an Afghan refugee's death-defying escape from persecution, made history as the first feature ever to receive Academy Award nominations in the documentary, international, and animation categories.

Participant launched an Impact Advisory Council in July 2022. Composed of leaders in the impact and entertainment space, the council is designed to provide feedback and guidance on social impact strategy and strengthen connections to those with shared goals.

=== Shutdown ===
On April 16, 2024, founder Jeff Skoll informed Participant's staff of his decision to shut the company down. The decision was attributed to changes over time in content creation and distribution, especially difficulties in developing successful streaming business models and suspension of production on multiple projects due to the 2023 Hollywood labor disputes. Sources state almost all of the company's staff would be laid off, with a holding company owning Participant's interests in its library of 140 titles. Participant would continue to be involved in certain projects in stages of completion, although it would no longer develop any new content.

== Films ==
Year	Film	Director	Distributor	Ref
2004	Arna's Children	Juliano Mer Khamis; Danniel Danniel	ThinkFilm	
2005	Murderball	Henry Alex Rubin; Dana Adam Shapiro	ThinkFilm	
2005	Good Night, and Good Luck	George Clooney	Warner Independent Pictures	
2005	North Country	Niki Caro	Warner Bros.	
2005	Syriana	Stephen Gaghan	Warner Bros.	
2006	American Gun	Aric Avelino	IFC Films	
2006	The World According to Sesame Street	Linda Hawkins Costigan; Linda Goldstein-Knowlton	Participant Media	
2006	An Inconvenient Truth	Davis Guggenheim	Paramount Vantage	
2006	Fast Food Nation	Richard Linklater	Fox Searchlight Pictures and The Weinstein Company	
2007	Angels in the Dust	Louise Hogarth	N/A	
2007	Man from Plains	Jonathan Demme	Sony Pictures Classics	
2007	Darfur Now	Ted Braun	Warner Independent Pictures and Participant Media	
2007	The Kite Runner	Marc Forster	DreamWorks and Paramount Vantage	
2007	Charlie Wilson's War	Mike Nichols	Universal Studios	
2008	Chicago 10	Brett Morgen	Roadside Attractions	
2008	The Visitor	Tom McCarthy	Overture Films	
2008	Standard Operating Procedure	Errol Morris	Sony Pictures Classics	
2009	The Soloist	Joe Wright	DreamWorks and Universal Studios	
2009	Food, Inc.	Robert Kenner	Magnolia Pictures	
2009	The Cove	Louie Psihoyos	Lionsgate and Roadside Attractions	
2009	Pressure Cooker	Mark Becker; Jennifer Grausman	N/A	
2009	The Informant!	Steven Soderbergh	Warner Bros.	
2010	Oceans	Jacques Perrin; Jacques Cluzaud	Walt Disney Studios Motion Pictures	
2010	The Crazies	Breck Eisner	Overture Films	
2010	Furry Vengeance	Roger Kumble	Summit Entertainment	
2010	Casino Jack and the United States of Money	Alex Gibney	Magnolia Pictures	
2010	Climate of Change	Brian Hill	Tribeca Film Festival	
2010	Countdown to Zero	Lucy Walker	Magnolia Pictures	
2010	Waiting for "Superman"	Davis Guggenheim	Paramount Vantage	
2010	Fair Game	Doug Liman	Summit Entertainment	
2011	Circumstance	Maryam Keshavarz	Participant Media and Roadside Attractions	
2011	Cane Toads: The Conquest	Mark Lewis	Pinnacle Films	
2011	The Beaver	Jodie Foster	Summit Entertainment	
2011	Page One: Inside the New York Times	Andrew Rossi	Magnolia Pictures	
2011	The Help	Tate Taylor	Walt Disney Studios Motion Pictures	
2011	Contagion	Steven Soderbergh	Warner Bros.	
2012	The Best Exotic Marigold Hotel	John Madden	Fox Searchlight Pictures	
2012	Last Call at the Oasis	Jessica Yu	ATO Pictures, Mongrel Media and Participant Media	
2012	No	Pablo Larraín	Sony Pictures Classics	
2012	Middle of Nowhere	Ava DuVernay	AFFRM and Participant Media	
2012	Lincoln	Steven Spielberg	Walt Disney Studios Motion Pictures and 20th Century Fox	
2012	Promised Land	Gus van Sant	Focus Features	
2013	99%: The Occupy Wall Street Collaborative Film	Aaron Aites, Audrey Ewell, Nina Krstic, Lucian Read	Participant Media	
2013	Snitch	Ric Roman Waugh	Summit Entertainment and Lionsgate	
2013	A Place at the Table	Kristi Jacobson and Lori Silverbush	Magnolia Pictures	
2013	State 194	Dan Setton	Participant Media	
2013	TEACH	Davis Guggenheim	CBS	
2013	The Fifth Estate	Bill Condon	Walt Disney Studios Motion Pictures	
2013	Made in America	Ron Howard	Phase 4 Films and The Exchange	
2014	The Unknown Known	Errol Morris	Radius-TWC	
2014	The Great Invisible	Margaret Brown	Radius-TWC	
2014	César Chávez	Diego Luna	Participant Media and Pantelion Films	
2014	Ivory Tower	Andrew Rossi	Paramount Pictures and Samuel Goldwyn Films	
2014	The Internet's Own Boy	Brian Knappenberger	Participant Media and FilmBuff	
2014	The Hundred-Foot Journey	Lasse Hallström	Walt Disney Studios Motion Pictures	
2014	Ardor	Pablo Fendrik	Aya Pro, Bac Films, Mosaico Filmes Distribuciones, StraDa Films, Bac Films International, and Sunfilm Entertainment	
2014	Out of the Dark	Lluis Quilez	Vertical Entertainment	
2014	Merchants of Doubt	Robert Kenner	Mongrel Media and Sony Pictures Classics	
2014	Citizenfour	Laura Poitras	Radius-TWC	
2014	A Most Violent Year	J. C. Chandor	A24	
2015	That Which I Love Destroys Me	Ric Roman Waugh	N/A	
2015	The Second Best Exotic Marigold Hotel	John Madden	Fox Searchlight Pictures	
2015	Misconception	Jessica Yu	N/A	
2015	Best of Enemies	Robert Gordon, Morgan Neville	Magnolia Pictures and Participant Media	
2015	The Prophet	Roger Allers	GKIDS	
2015	The Look of Silence	Joshua Oppenheimer	Why Not Productions, Koch Media, Cinema Delictatessen, and Alamo Drafthouse Cinema	
2015	He Named Me Malala	Davis Guggenheim	Fox Searchlight Pictures and National Geographic Channel	
2015	3 1/2 Minutes, Ten Bullets	Marc Silver	Yle	
2015	Bridge of Spies	Steven Spielberg	Walt Disney Studios Motion Pictures and 20th Century Fox	
2015	Beasts of No Nation	Cary Fukunaga	Netflix and Bleecker Street	
2015	Our Brand Is Crisis	David Gordon Green	Warner Bros.	
2015	Spotlight	Tom McCarthy	Open Road Films	
2015	Kingdom of Shadows	Bernado Ruiz	Matson Films	
2016	The Music of Strangers: Yo-Yo Ma and the Silk Road Ensemble	Morgan Neville	The Orchard	
2016	The Light Between Oceans	Derek Cianfrance	Walt Disney Studios Motion Pictures and Entertainment One	
2016	Denial	Mick Jackson	Bleecker Street	
2016	Deepwater Horizon	Peter Berg	Summit Entertainment	
2016	Middle School: The Worst Years of My Life	Steve Carr	CBS Films (distributed by Lionsgate)	
2016	Midsummer in Newtown	Lloyd Kramer	Vulcan Productions and Participant Media	
2016	A Monster Calls	J.A. Bayona	Focus Features, Lionsgate and Universal Studios	
2016	Neruda	Pablo Larrain	The Orchard, 20th Century Fox and Wild Bunch	
2016	Zero Days	Alex Gibney	Magnolia Pictures and Showtime	
2017	An Inconvenient Sequel: Truth to Power	Bonni Cohen and Jon Shenk	Paramount Pictures	
2017	Human Flow	Ai Weiwei	24 Media Production Company, AC Films, and Ai Weiwei Studio	
2017	Wonder	Stephen Chbosky	Lionsgate	
2017	Breathe	Andy Serkis	Bleecker Street and Participant Media	
2017	Shot Caller	Ric Roman Waugh	Saban Films	
2017	The Post	Steven Spielberg	20th Century Fox	
2018	7 Days in Entebbe	Jose Padhila	Focus Features	
2018	RBG	Betsy West; Julie Cohen	Magnolia Pictures and Participant Media	
2018	Far from the Tree	Rachel Dretzin	Sundance Selects	
2018	Green Book	Peter Farrelly	Universal Studios	
2018	On the Basis of Sex	Mimi Leder	Focus Features	
2018	The Price of Free	Derek Doneen	YouTube	
2018	Roma	Alfonso Cuarón	Netflix	
2019	Foster	Mark Jonathan Harris	HBO	
2019	Aquarela	Viktor Kossakovsky	Sony Pictures Classics	
2019	American Factory	Steven Bognar and Julia Reichert	Netflix	
2019	Monos	Alejandro Landes	NEON	
2019	The Boy Who Harnessed the Wind	Chiwetel Ejiofor	Netflix	
2019	Captive State	Rupert Wyatt	Focus Features	
2019	Dark Waters	Todd Haynes	Focus Features	
2019	Just Mercy	Destin Daniel Cretton	Warner Bros. Pictures	
2019	Slay the Dragon	Barak Goodman and Chris Durrance	Magnolia Pictures	
2020	American Utopia	Spike Lee	HBO Films	
2020	Final Account	Luke Holland	Focus Features	
2020	John Lewis: Good Trouble	Dawn Porter	Magnolia Pictures and Participant	
2020	Totally Under Control	Alex Gibney	NEON	
2021	Judas and the Black Messiah	Shaka King	Warner Bros. Pictures	
2021	Flee	Jonas Poher Rasmussen	NEON and Participant	
2021	My Name is Pauli Murray	Betsy West; Julie Cohen	Amazon Studios	
2021	Unseen Skies	Yaara Bou Melhem		
2021	White Coat Rebels	Greg Barker		
2021	Stillwater	Tom McCarthy	Focus Features	
2021	The Good House	Maya Forbes and Wally Wolodarsky	Lionsgate and Roadside Attractions	
2021	The First Wave	Matthew Heineman	NEON and National Geographic Documentary Films	
2021	Invisible Demons	Rahul Jain		
2021	Costa Brava, Lebanon	Mounia Akl		
2022	Descendant	Margaret Brown	Netflix	
2022	All the Beauty and the Bloodshed	Laura Poitras	NEON	
2023	Nuclear Now	Oliver Stone	Abramorama	
2023	We Grown Now	Minhal Baig	Sony Pictures Classics and Stage 6 Films	
2024	Out of My Mind	Amber Sealey	Disney+	
2024	Rob Peace	Chiwetel Ejiofor	Republic Pictures	
2024	Shirley	John Ridley	Netflix	
2024	White Bird	Marc Forster	Lionsgate	
2024	Separated	Errol Morris	MSNBC Films	

== Television ==
Year	TV series	Director	Distributor	Ref
2018	America to Me	Steve James	Starz	
2019	When They See Us	Ava DuVernay	Netflix	
2020–2022	Noughts + Crosses	Koby Adom	BBC One	
2020	City So Real	Steve James	National Geographic	
2022	Keep Sweet: Pray and Obey	Rachel Dretzin; Grace McNally	Netflix	
2024	Interior Chinatown	Charles Yu	Hulu	
2026	Trust Me: The False Prophet	Rachel Dretzin	Netflix	

== See also ==
- List of California companies
- List of film production companies by country
