= Keep Sweet: Pray and Obey =

2022 American Netflix documentary series

- Release poster
- Genre: Documentary; True crime
- Directed by: Rachel Dretzin; Grace McNally
- Opening theme: "Feel More" by Michelle Gurevich
- Country of origin: United States
- Original language: English
- No. of episodes: 4

Production
- Cinematography: Justin Zweifach
- Running time: 45–53 minutes
- Production companies: Ark Media; Participant

Original release
- Network: Netflix
- Release: June 8, 2022

Keep Sweet: Pray and Obey is an American documentary series on Netflix, surrounding the polygamous Fundamentalist Church of Jesus Christ of Latter-Day Saints, an offshoot of mainstream Mormonism, and its previous leader Warren S. Jeffs. The series was released on June 8, 2022, on Netflix. It is directed by Rachel Dretzin, and Grace McNally, who began interviewing survivors after visiting Short Creek, Utah, the headquarters of the FLDS Church.

Between June 5, 2022, and June 19, 2022, the docuseries was watched for 58.78 million hours on Netflix globally.

== Etymology ==
The title of the series is derived from the motto "Keep Sweet, Pray, and Obey," coined by the preceding president Rulon Jeffs, and used to convey how women should behave in relation to their husband. According to a woman going by the name "Charlene", who was interviewed in the series, the mantra was frequently sung aloud, and meant "to be in control of your emotions and you didn't display things like anger or resentment or frustration." The latter part of the motto, "Pray and Obey" is shown to adorn the chimney of a house belonging to Warren Jeffs.

== Premise ==
Several former FLDS members, or survivors, are interviewed by Dretzin on both their experiences inside the church, as well providing testimony to Jeffs' systematic coercion and exercises of power toward the members of the congregation. Rebecca Musser, a former wife of Rulon, appears in each of the episodes, as does her sister Elissa Wall. People outside of the church, either related to the events transpiring following the church's move from Salt Lake City to Short Creek, and the move of headquarters from Short Creek to the Yearning for Zion Ranch, or for their previous work covering the FLDS, were also interviewed. These people include both the investigative journalist Mike Watkiss, who had previously done several reports on the church, private investigator Sam Brower, who had investigated the church for several years, and attorney Roger Hoole.

== Episodes ==
No.	Title
1	"Part 1"
Rulon Jeffs' family members and ex-wives discuss life in the Fundamentalist Church of Jesus Christ of Latter-Day Saints and the role of polygamy.
2	"Part 2"
Warren Jeffs tightens his grip on all aspects of FLDS life in Short Creek, Arizona. A private investigator and a TV journalist raise concerns.
3	"Part 3"
The church expels prominent men, expands surveillance and constructs a massive temple on a Texas ranch. Witness testimony helps the investigation.
4	"Part 4"
Despite the arrest, Warren maintains control over the church. Child Protective Services removes children from the ranch, causing a media frenzy.

== Production ==
According to Dretzin herself, the focus "[is] not only the experience of being in that cult", but instead "It's on the people, particularly the women who managed to defy it and escape it, which—if you know anything about the FLDS—is a pretty miraculous and incredible thing to do.” The series also featured background film with actors portraying both Jeffs and relatives of interviewees in all of the episodes.

Dretzin has also expressed interest in making a second season, albeit stating that the decision is ultimately up to Netflix; she would eventually direct the companion series Trust Me: The False Prophet about Samuel Bateman.

== Reception ==
On the review aggregator website Rotten Tomatoes, 91% of 11 critics' reviews are positive.

== See also ==
- Preaching Evil: A Wife on the Run with Warren Jeffs
