= Pressure Cooker (2008 film) =

2008 American documentary

Pressure Cooker is a 2008 documentary film directed by Mark Becker and Jennifer Grausman.

== Background ==
The film revolves around a teacher of a culinary course, Wilma Stephenson, who has been instrumental in leading her students in working-class Northeast Philadelphia to receive large scholarships for college. The film begins with Stephenson stating that, the year prior, 11 of her seniors has earned more than $750,000 in culinary scholarships. As the crew follows the students for the length of year, the students learn, expand their abilities, and compete in cutthroat competitions to earn enough in scholarships to pursue their dreams.

== Reception ==
On the review aggregator website Rotten Tomatoes, the film holds an approval rating of 92%, based on 25 reviews, with an average rating of 7.7/10.
