= Diane Weyermann =

American film producer (1955–2021)

- Born: Diane Hope Weyermann; September 22, 1955; St. Louis, Missouri, U.S.
- Died: October 14, 2021 (age 66); New York City, U.S.
- Occupation: Film producer
- Organization: Participant Media CCO

Diane Hope Weyermann (September 22, 1955 – October 14, 2021) was an American film producer who was the chief content officer of Participant Media, a film and television production company.

== Early life ==
Diane Hope Weyermann was born in St. Louis, Missouri, on September 22, 1955. She graduated from George Washington University in 1977, and received a Juris Doctor degree from Saint Louis University School of Law in 1981. After working in legal aid, she returned to school and obtained a Master of Fine Arts in film at Columbia College Chicago in 1992.

== Career ==
In her role at Participant, Weyermann was responsible for the company’s documentary feature film and television productions. In addition to the 2021 twice Academy Award-nominated Collective (for Best Feature Documentary as well as Best International Feature), Participant’s recent documentary projects which Weyermann oversaw include the Oscar winner American Factory, Emmy-nominated City So Real, John Lewis: Good Trouble, Sing Me a Song, Slay the Dragon, Watson, Aquarela, Foster, America to Me, The Price of Free, Far from the Tree, Human Flow, An Inconvenient Sequel: Truth to Power, The Music of Strangers: Yo Yo Ma and the Silk Road Ensemble, and Zero Days. Previous releases include Oscar-winning films, CITIZENFOUR and An Inconvenient Truth, Oscar-nominated RBG, Oscar-nominated The Look of Silence, Oscar-nominated and Emmy-winning Food, Inc., and Emmy-nominated The Great Invisible.

In 2018, Weyermann was named as a co-chair of the Oscars’ Foreign Language Film Award Executive Committee. Prior to joining Participant in 2005, Weyermann was the founding director of the Sundance Institute's Documentary Film Program. In 2001, when she joined Sundance Institute to run international activities, the Soros Fund was moved to Sundance Institute, where she began laying the groundwork for what became the Documentary Film Program. During her tenure at Sundance, she launched two annual documentary film labs, focusing on the creative process and the use of compositions in documentary film. Before her time at Sundance, she was director of the Open Society Institute New York’s Arts and Culture Program where she launched the Soros Documentary Fund which later became the Sundance Documentary Fund. Titles with which Weyermann was involved before her death include Final Account, David Byrne’s American Utopia, My Name is Pauli Murray, and the upcoming releases The First Wave, Flee, Unseen Skies, White Coat Rebels, and Invisible Demons. The 2022 Netflix four-part docuseries Keep Sweet: Pray and Obey, which examines convicted rapist Warren Jeffs' rise in the Fundamentalist Church of Jesus Christ of Latter-Day Saints, along with aspects of the lives of FLDS members, is dedicated to Diane Weyermann. Diane served as an executive producer on the series.

== Personal life ==
Weyermann had suffered from lung cancer prior to her death at age 66 on October 14, 2021, in New York City. She was survived by her sister and brother-in-law and three nephews.
