= Samuel Bateman =

American criminal and religious leader

- Born: Samuel Rappylee Bateman c. 1976; Colorado City, Arizona, U.S.
- Known for: Leader of a polygamous FLDS splinter sect; child sexual abuse
- Criminal charges: Conspiracy to commit transportation of a minor for criminal sexual activity; conspiracy to commit kidnapping
- Criminal penalty: 50 years' federal imprisonment, followed by lifetime supervised release
- Criminal status: Incarcerated

Samuel Rappylee Bateman (born c. 1976) is an American convicted sex offender who led a small polygamous splinter sect of the Fundamentalist Church of Jesus Christ of Latter-Day Saints (FLDS) based in Short Creek, Arizona. Self-styled as a prophet of and successor to imprisoned FLDS leader Warren Jeffs, Bateman assembled more than 20 "spiritual wives" between 2019 and 2022. At least 10 of these wives were minors, with some victims as young as nine years old. He was arrested in 2022, pleaded guilty in April 2024, and was sentenced in December 2024 to 50 years in federal prison.

His case was the subject of the 2026 Netflix documentary series Trust Me: The False Prophet, directed by Rachel Dretzin.

== Background ==
Bateman was raised within the tight-knit FLDS community in Colorado City, Arizona. His father DeLoy Bateman was a teacher. Public records indicate he was once in a monogamous marriage and had children while working in local trades.

The FLDS is a polygamous offshoot of the mainstream Church of Jesus Christ of Latter-day Saints (LDS Church), which officially renounced polygamy in 1890. Central to FLDS doctrine is the belief that the church president is a living prophet who receives direct revelation from God. The church was led by Rulon Jeffs until 2002, after which leadership passed to his son, Warren Jeffs. Following Jeffs's arrest in 2006 and his conviction and life sentence in 2011 for the sexual assault of underage girls, leadership of the FLDS fell into uncertainty and the organisation began to fragment.

== Rise to power ==
Around 2019, following a period in which FLDS leadership had banned married couples from having sex (a consequence of Warren Jeffs being unable to conduct new marriages from prison), Bateman began claiming his own prophetic authority.

He proclaimed himself a successor-prophet, telling followers that Jeffs had died. He assembled a breakaway group of approximately 50 people who came to be known informally as the "Samuelites".

Bateman recruited followers across Arizona, Utah, Colorado, and Nebraska, claiming to possess what he described as "impressions of Heavenly Father's will". He harboured grand ambitions: during early sessions with followers, he declared his intention to become "the most influential person on Earth" and to govern North and South America. He also launched a self-help YouTube channel partly in hopes of attracting international attention.

Male followers were pressured into surrendering their daughters and wives to Bateman as "spiritual brides". Those who refused risked being banished from salvation under the sect's doctrine. Bateman also channelled funds from followers into the purchase of luxury vehicles.

== Criminal conduct ==
From 2019 to 2022, Bateman amassed more than 20 "spiritual wives," at least 10 of whom were children when he first engaged in sexual conduct with them, with the youngest aged nine. None of the unions were legally or ceremonially recognized.

According to his plea agreement and court documents, Bateman:

- Regularly directed individual and group sexual activity involving child victims and adult followers;
- Transported minors across state lines for purposes of sexual abuse, including in cramped and unsafe conditions;
- Transmitted a live video stream of child sexual abuse to his followers;
- Conducted so-called "atonement ceremonies" in which male followers were required to engage in sexual acts with others' wives and children as punishment or religious obligation;
- Attempted in 2019 to take his then fourteen-year-old daughter as a wife, reportedly offering her two bags of chips and $50 USD.

FBI affidavits described the operation as a multi-state child sexual abuse conspiracy framed in religious doctrine. Prosecutors later stated: "These men were not victims of the FLDS teachings. They created their own ideology to serve their selfish interests."

== Investigation and arrest ==
=== Undercover documentary work ===
In 2021, cult psychology researcher Dr. Christine Marie and her videographer husband Tolga Katas, who had relocated to the Short Creek area to study FLDS culture, were approached by Bateman, who sought to participate in a documentary project he believed would spread his message. Unaware that the couple were secretly gathering evidence of his crimes, Bateman allowed them extensive access to his compound, followers, and gatherings.

While traveling with Bateman in 2021, Marie recorded him describing acts of ritualistic sexual abuse. She subsequently contacted law enforcement and became an FBI informant. The footage and intelligence gathered by Marie and Katas formed a significant part of the evidentiary case against Bateman.

=== Arrest ===
In August 2022, Bateman was stopped by Arizona Department of Public Safety officers in Flagstaff, after a passer-by observed small fingers poking through the slats of a closed trailer being towed by Bateman's vehicle. Officers discovered three girls aged between 11 and 14 inside the poorly ventilated trailer, which contained only a makeshift toilet, a sofa, and camping chairs. Bateman was initially charged with child endangerment.

In September 2022, federal agents conducted a raid on his compound in Colorado City. Bateman was subsequently charged with destruction of records in an official proceeding, arising from a phone call in which he instructed followers to delete his account on the encrypted messaging application Signal and destroy other documents.

A 57-count superseding federal indictment was subsequently filed, naming Bateman and multiple co-defendants.

== Legal proceedings ==
=== Guilty plea ===
On April 1, 2024, Bateman pleaded guilty to conspiracy to commit transportation of a minor for criminal sexual activity and conspiracy to commit kidnapping. In his plea agreement, Bateman admitted to regularly engaging in sexual conduct with ten child victims as well as at least twelve adult wives.

=== Sentencing ===
On December 9, 2024, U.S. District Judge Susan M. Brnovich sentenced Bateman to 50 years in federal prison on each count, to be served concurrently, followed by lifetime supervised release. Judge Brnovich stated that the harm inflicted on Bateman's victims was "absolutely immeasurable" and described the children as having been reduced to "sex slaves".

During the sentencing hearing, several victims delivered impact statements. One survivor, who had been nine years old when Bateman took her as a "wife" and began abusing her, addressed him directly: "My innocence was stolen." Another, who had been 14 at the time of her abuse, read from a list written in red ink of the things she had been able to do since Bateman's arrest.

Federal prosecutor Dimitra Sampson displayed photographs of each of the ten child victims to the court.

=== Co-defendants ===
Eleven of Bateman's adult followers were convicted of charges related to the child sexual abuse conspiracy: two by jury verdict and nine by guilty plea. Among those sentenced included:

- LaDell Jay Bistline Jr.: sentenced to life in prison; had provided his own two daughters, aged nine and eleven at the time, to Bateman, and regularly participated in group sexual abuse with Bateman and the child victims over three years.
- Torrance Bistline: convicted at trial; prosecutors alleged he funded the operation and participated in an "atonement ceremony" involving a 14-year-old.

== Media coverage ==
Trust Me: The False Prophet (2026) is a four-part Netflix documentary series directed by Emmy- and Peabody Award-winning filmmaker Rachel Dretzin, who previously directed Keep Sweet: Pray and Obey (2022), an FLDS docuseries about Warren Jeffs. The series draws extensively on footage and recordings gathered by Dr. Marie and Katas during their time in Bateman's community, as well as court documents and testimony from survivors. Two of Bateman's former wives, Naomi "Nomz" Bistline and Moretta Johnson, appeared in the documentary and testified against him at trial.

== Incarceration ==
As of September 2026, Bateman is listed by the Federal Bureau of Prisons as being imprisoned at USP Victorville. Bateman's release date is listed as May 5, 2065 which will make him approximately 89 at the time of his release, to be followed by a lifetime of federal supervision.
