= 1992 in the United States =

- Decades: 1970s; 1980s; 1990s; 2000s; 2010s
- See also: History of the United States (1991–2016); Timeline of United States history (1990–2009); List of years in the United States

Events from the year 1992 in the United States.

== Incumbents ==
=== Federal government ===
- President: George H. W. Bush (R-Texas)
- Vice President: Dan Quayle (R-Indiana)
- Chief Justice: William Rehnquist (Virginia)
- Speaker of the House of Representatives: Tom Foley (D-Washington)
- Senate Majority Leader: George J. Mitchell (D-Maine)
- Congress: 102nd

==== State governments ====
Governors and lieutenant governors

=== Governors ===
- Governor of Alabama: H. Guy Hunt (Republican)
- Governor of Alaska: Wally Hickel (Alaskan Independence)/(Republican)
- Governor of Arizona: Fife Symington III (Republican)
- Governor of Arkansas: Bill Clinton (Democratic) (until December 12), Jim Guy Tucker (Democratic) (starting December 12)
- Governor of California: Pete Wilson (Republican)
- Governor of Colorado: Roy Romer (Democratic)
- Governor of Connecticut: Lowell P. Weicker Jr. (A Connecticut)
- Governor of Delaware: Michael Castle (Republican) (until December 31), Dale E. Wolf (Republican) (starting December 31)
- Governor of Florida: Lawton Chiles (Democratic)
- Governor of Georgia: Zell Miller (Democratic)
- Governor of Hawaii: John D. Waihee III (Democratic)
- Governor of Idaho: Cecil D. Andrus (Democratic)
- Governor of Illinois: Jim Edgar (Republican)
- Governor of Indiana: Evan Bayh (Democratic)
- Governor of Iowa: Terry E. Branstad (Republican)
- Governor of Kansas: Joan Finney (Democratic)
- Governor of Kentucky: Brereton Jones (Democratic)
- Governor of Louisiana: Buddy Roemer (Democratic)/(Republican) (until January 13), Edwin W. Edwards (Democratic) (starting January 13)
- Governor of Maine: John R. McKernan Jr. (Republican)
- Governor of Maryland: William Donald Schaefer (Democratic)
- Governor of Massachusetts: William F. Weld (Republican)
- Governor of Michigan: John Engler (Republican)
- Governor of Minnesota: Arne H. Carlson (Republican)
- Governor of Mississippi: Ray Mabus (Democratic) (until January 14), Kirk Fordice (Republican) (starting January 14)
- Governor of Missouri: John Ashcroft (Republican)
- Governor of Montana: Stan Stephens (Republican)
- Governor of Nebraska: Ben Nelson (Democratic)
- Governor of Nevada: Bob Miller (Democratic)
- Governor of New Hampshire: Judd Gregg (Republican)
- Governor of New Jersey: James Florio (Democratic)
- Governor of New Mexico: Bruce King (Democratic)
- Governor of New York: Mario Cuomo (Democratic)
- Governor of North Carolina: James G. Martin (Republican)
- Governor of North Dakota: George A. Sinner (Democratic) (until December 15), Ed Schafer (Republican) (starting December 15)
- Governor of Ohio: George Voinovich (Republican)
- Governor of Oklahoma: David Walters (Democratic)
- Governor of Oregon: Barbara Roberts (Democratic)
- Governor of Pennsylvania: Robert P. Casey (Democratic)
- Governor of Rhode Island: Bruce Sundlun (Democratic)
- Governor of South Carolina: Carroll A. Campbell Jr. (Republican)
- Governor of South Dakota: George S. Mickelson (Republican)
- Governor of Tennessee: Ned McWherter (Democratic)
- Governor of Texas: Ann Richards (Democratic)
- Governor of Utah: Norman H. Bangerter (Republican)
- Governor of Vermont: Howard Dean (Democratic)
- Governor of Virginia: Douglas Wilder (Democratic)
- Governor of Washington: Booth Gardner (Democratic)
- Governor of West Virginia: Gaston Caperton (Democratic)
- Governor of Wisconsin: Tommy Thompson (Republican)
- Governor of Wyoming: Mike Sullivan (Democratic)

=== Lieutenant governors ===
- Lieutenant Governor of Alabama: Jim Folsom Jr. (Democratic)
- Lieutenant Governor of Alaska: Jack Coghill (Alaskan Independence)
- Lieutenant Governor of Arkansas: Jim Guy Tucker (Democratic) (until December 12), vacant (starting December 12)
- Lieutenant Governor of California: Leo T. McCarthy (Democratic)
- Lieutenant Governor of Colorado: Mike Callihan (Democratic)
- Lieutenant Governor of Connecticut: Eunice Groark (A Connecticut)
- Lieutenant Governor of Delaware: Dale E. Wolf (Republican) (until December 31), vacant (starting December 31)
- Lieutenant Governor of Florida: Buddy MacKay (Democratic)
- Lieutenant Governor of Georgia: Pierre Howard (Democratic)
- Lieutenant Governor of Hawaii: Ben Cayetano (Democratic)
- Lieutenant Governor of Idaho: Butch Otter (Republican)
- Lieutenant Governor of Illinois: Bob Kustra (Republican)
- Lieutenant Governor of Indiana: Frank O'Bannon (Democratic)
- Lieutenant Governor of Iowa: Joy Corning (Republican)
- Lieutenant Governor of Kansas: Jim Francisco (Democratic)
- Lieutenant Governor of Kentucky: Paul E. Patton (Democratic)
- Lieutenant Governor of Louisiana: Paul Hardy (Republican) (until January 13), Melinda Schwegmann (Democratic) (starting January 13)
- Lieutenant Governor of Maryland: Melvin A. Steinberg (Democratic)
- Lieutenant Governor of Massachusetts: Paul Cellucci (Republican)
- Lieutenant Governor of Michigan: Connie Binsfeld (Republican)
- Lieutenant Governor of Minnesota: Joanell Dyrstad (Democratic)
- Lieutenant Governor of Mississippi: Brad Dye (Democratic) (until January 14), Eddie Briggs (Republican) (starting January 14)
- Lieutenant Governor of Missouri: Mel Carnahan (Democratic)
- Lieutenant Governor of Montana: Denny Rehberg (Republican)
- Lieutenant Governor of Nebraska: Maxine Moul (Democratic)
- Lieutenant Governor of Nevada: Sue Wagner (Republican)
- Lieutenant Governor of New Mexico: Casey Luna (Democratic)
- Lieutenant Governor of New York: Stan Lundine (Democratic)
- Lieutenant Governor of North Carolina: James Carson Gardner (Republican)
- Lieutenant Governor of North Dakota: Lloyd Omdahl (Democratic) (until December 15), Rosemarie Myrdal (Republican) (starting December 15)
- Lieutenant Governor of Ohio: Mike DeWine (Democratic)
- Lieutenant Governor of Oklahoma: Jack Mildren (Democratic)
- Lieutenant Governor of Pennsylvania: Mark Singel (Democratic)
- Lieutenant Governor of Rhode Island: Roger N. Begin (Democratic)
- Lieutenant Governor of South Carolina: Nick Theodore (Democratic)
- Lieutenant Governor of South Dakota: Walter Dale Miller (Republican)
- Lieutenant Governor of Tennessee: John S. Wilder (Democratic)
- Lieutenant Governor of Texas: Bob Bullock (Democratic)
- Lieutenant Governor of Utah: W. Val Oveson (Republican)
- Lieutenant Governor of Vermont: vacant
- Lieutenant Governor of Virginia: Don Beyer (Democratic)
- Lieutenant Governor of Washington: Joel Pritchard (Republican)
- Lieutenant Governor of Wisconsin: Scott McCallum (Republican)

== Events ==
=== January ===
- January 1 – George H. W. Bush becomes the first U.S. president to address the Australian Parliament.
- January 5 – Seventeen-year-old Kelly Dae Wilson disappears in Gilmer, Texas. Her case became one of the biggest unsolved missing-persons cases in Texas.
- January 8 – George H. W. Bush is televised falling violently ill at a state dinner in Japan, vomiting into the lap of Prime Minister Kiichi Miyazawa and fainting.
- January 11 – Twelve-year-old Shanda Sharer is tortured and burned to death by four teenage girls in Madison, Indiana. The crime attracts international attention due to its brutality and the young age of the perpetrators.
- January 26
  - Boris Yeltsin announces that Russia will stop targeting United States cities with nuclear weapons.
  - Super Bowl XXVI: The Washington Redskins defeat the Buffalo Bills 37–24 at the Hubert H. Humphrey Metrodome in Minneapolis, Minnesota.
- January 28 – George H. W. Bush delivers his final State of the Union Address.

=== February ===
- February 1 – The United States Coast Guard begins deporting the first of some 14,000 refugees from Haiti.
- February 10
  - Tom Harkin wins the Iowa Democratic Caucus.
  - In Indianapolis, Indiana, boxer Mike Tyson is convicted of raping Desiree Washington.
- February 17 – A court in Milwaukee, Wisconsin, sentences serial killer Jeffrey Dahmer to life in prison.
- February 18 – In New Hampshire, U.S. President George H. W. Bush defeats Pat Buchanan in the Republican primary; Paul Tsongas leads the Democratic candidates.
- February 22 – On CNN's Larry King Live, Texas billionaire Ross Perot announces that he will run for U.S. president as an independent if volunteers put him on the ballot in all 50 states.

=== March ===
- March 10 – On 'Super Tuesday', U.S. President George H. W. Bush and Arkansas Governor Bill Clinton win most of the primaries held.
- March 22 – USAir Flight 405, a domestic flight from New York City to Cleveland, Ohio, crashes into the Flushing Bay moments after taking off from LaGuardia Airport, killing 27 of the 51 people on board. The causes of the accident were revealed to be ice on the aircraft and pilot error.
- March 30 – The 64th Academy Awards, hosted by Billy Crystal, are held at Dorothy Chandler Pavilion in Los Angeles, with Jonathan Demme's The Silence of the Lambs winning five awards, including Best Picture and Best Director. Barry Levinson's Bugsy leads the nominations with ten. The telecast garners over 44 million viewers.
- March 31 – USS Missouri (BB-63), the last active U.S. Navy battleship, is decommissioned at Long Beach, California.

=== April ===
- April 2 – In New York, Mafia boss John Gotti is convicted of the murder of mob boss Paul Castellano and racketeering, and is later sentenced to life in prison.
- April 5
  - The World Wrestling Federation holds WrestleMania VIII from the Hoosier Dome in Indianapolis, Indiana, drawing a crowd of 62,167.
  - Approximately 500,000 people march on Washington, D.C. in support of abortion rights in advance of oral arguments in the case Planned Parenthood v. Casey.
- April 6
  - Microsoft releases Windows 3.1.
  - Barney & Friends debuts on PBS.
- April 8 – Former tennis player Arthur Ashe, 48, announces that he is suffering from the AIDS virus, which he is believed to have contracted from a blood transfusion during heart surgery in 1983. He had been diagnosed with HIV more than three years prior.
- April 9 – A Miami, Florida jury convicts former Panamanian ruler Manuel Noriega of assisting Colombia's cocaine cartel.
- April 13 – The Chicago flood occurs, causing approximately $2 billion in damages to the city (equivalent to $4.34 billion in 2023).
- April 25 – The 7.2 M_{w} Cape Mendocino earthquake shakes the north coast of California with a maximum Mercalli intensity of IX (Violent), causing $48.3–75 million in losses and 98–356 injuries. This was the first instrumentally recorded event that showed shallow angle thrust movement on the southern Cascadia subduction zone. Two triggered strike-slip events caused additional destruction the following day.
- April 29–May 4 – In Simi Valley, California, a jury acquits four LAPD police officers accused of excessive force in the videotaped beating of black motorist Rodney King, causing the 1992 Los Angeles riots and leading to 53 deaths and $1 billion in damage.

=== May ===
- May 1 – Eric Houston of Yuba County kills four, injures nine, and holds many others hostage at Lindhurst High School in Olivehurst, California.
- May 5 – Alabama ratifies a 202-year-old proposed amendment to the United States Constitution making the Twenty-seventh Amendment law. This amendment bars the U.S. Congress from giving itself a midterm or retroactive pay raise.
- May 16 – STS-49: Space Shuttle Endeavour lands safely after a successful maiden voyage.
- May 18 – The Twenty-seventh Amendment to the United States Constitution is enacted.
- May 19
  - In San Francisco, U.S. Vice President Dan Quayle gives his famous Murphy Brown speech.
  - In Massapequa, New York, Amy Fisher shoots Mary Jo Buttafuoco, wife of Joey Buttafuoco.
- May 22 – After 30 years, Johnny Carson retires as host of NBC's The Tonight Show.
- May 25 – Jay Leno becomes the new host of NBC's The Tonight Show, following the retirement of Johnny Carson.

=== June ===
June 24: Franco-American Flag

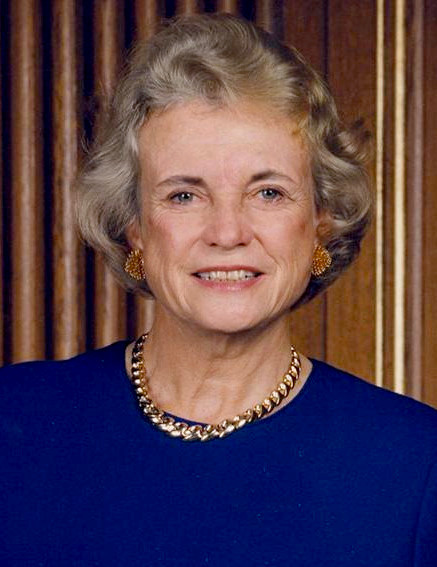
Governor Bob Casey of Pennsylvania (left) was a major anti-abortion advocate within the Democratic Party and is the Respondent in Casey due to an anti-abortion law enacted during his tenure as Governor. Justice Sandra Day O'Connor (right) was one of the three authors of the "undue burden" standard that she first advocated for in earlier abortion rulings.
- June – As a result of the early 1990s recession and subsequent sluggish job creation, unemployment peaks at 7.8%, a level not seen since March 1984. This would contribute to President George H. W. Bush's defeat to Bill Clinton in the election later that year.
- June 1 – Kentucky celebrates its bicentennial statehood.
- June 15 – Delta Phi Beta, a South Asian fraternity is founded at the University of California, Berkeley.
- June 16 – A federal grand jury indicts Caspar Weinberger for his role in covering up the Iran–Contra affair.
- June 17 – A 'Joint Understanding' agreement on arms reduction is signed by U.S. President George H. W. Bush and Russian President Boris Yeltsin (this is later codified in START II).
- June 23 – Mafia boss John Gotti is sentenced to life in prison, after being found guilty of conspiracy to commit murder and racketeering on April 2.
- June 24
  - The Franco-American Flag is officially raised for the first time in Manchester, New Hampshire. The flag was presented by singer Édith Butler as part of a tour.
  - The Supreme Court rules 5–4 in Planned Parenthood v. Casey, the first landmark abortion case since Roe v. Wade. In Casey the Court decided to uphold the "essential holding" of Roe that a woman has the right to an abortion but introduced a new "undue burden" standard which allows states to impose certain regulation so long as those regulations did not create a "substantial obstacle in the path of a woman seeking an abortion before the fetus attains viability."
- June 28
  - The 7.3 M_{w} Landers earthquake shakes the Mojave Desert region of Southern California with a maximum Mercalli intensity of IX (Violent), causing $92 million in losses, three deaths and 400+ injuries.
  - The 6.5 M_{w} Big Bear earthquake shakes the San Bernardino Mountains region of Southern California about three hours later. This triggered event had a maximum Mercalli intensity of VIII (Severe), causing moderate damage and some injuries.

=== July ===
- July – The Goosebumps series of children's horror fiction, penned by R. L. Stine, is first published.
- July 9 – Bill Clinton announces his selection of Al Gore as his running mate in the 1992 U.S. presidential election.
- July 10 – In Miami, Florida, former Panamanian leader Manuel Noriega is sentenced to 40 years in prison for drug and racketeering violations.
- July 16 – Arkansas Governor Bill Clinton is nominated for U.S. president and Tennessee Senator Al Gore for vice president at the Democratic National Convention in New York City.

=== August ===
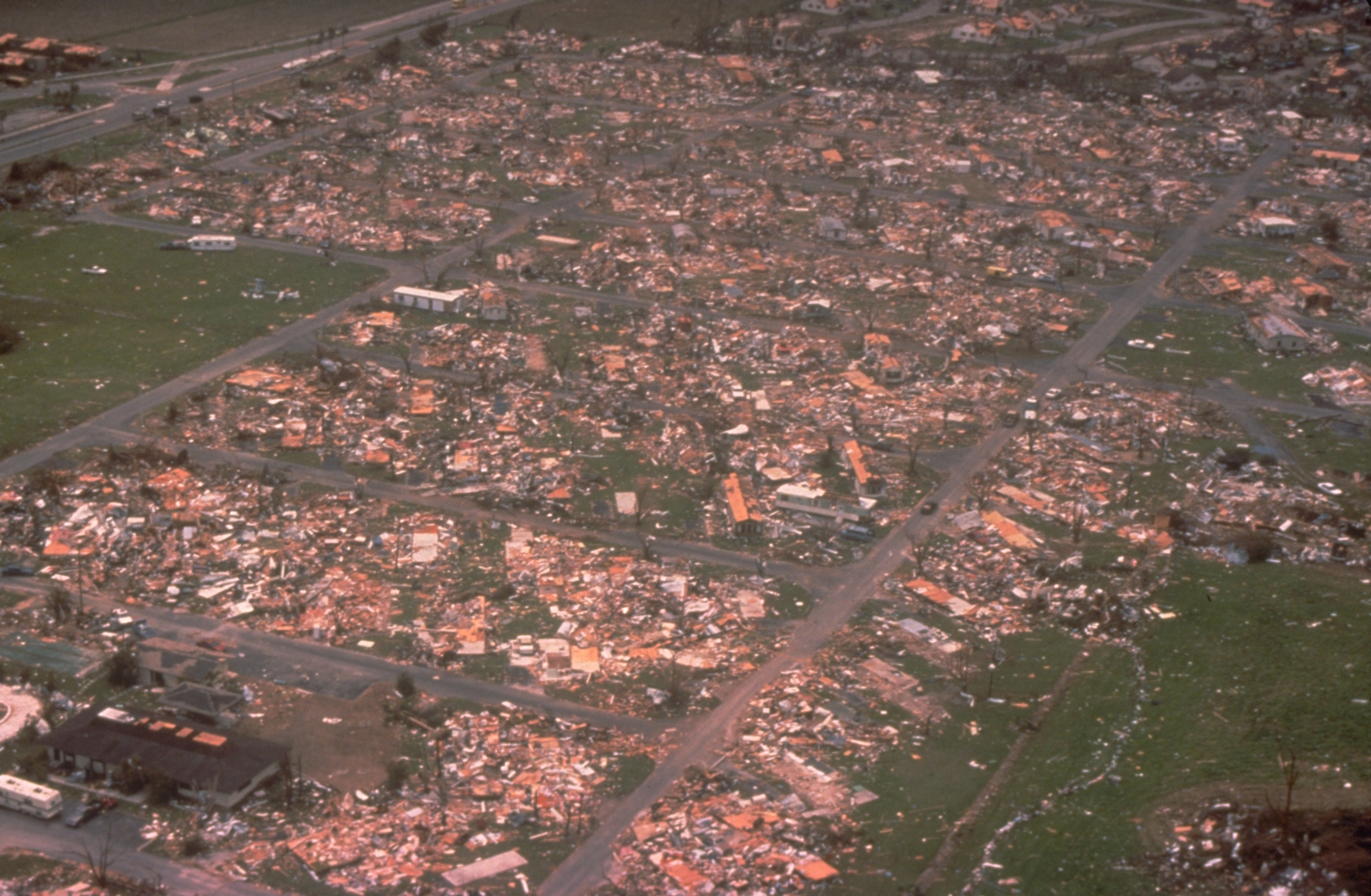
August 24–28: Hurricane Andrew

- August 11 – The largest shopping mall in the U.S., Minnesota's Mall of America, constructed on 78 acres (316,000 m^{2}), opens in Bloomington.
- August 20 – The Republican National Convention in Houston, Texas re-nominates U.S. President George H. W. Bush and Vice President Dan Quayle. Pat Buchanan, one of Bush's opponents in the primaries, delivers a controversial convention speech, in which he refers to a "religious war" in the country.
- August 21–22 – Events at Ruby Ridge, Idaho are sparked by a federal U.S. Marshal surveillance team, resulting in the death of a Marshal, Sam Weaver, and his dog, and the next day the wounding of Randy Weaver, the death of his wife Vicki, and the wounding of Kevin Harris.
- August 24–28 – Hurricane Andrew hits south Florida and dissipates over the Tennessee valley, killing 65 and causing US$26.5 billion in damage.

=== September ===
- September 5 – Batman: The Animated Series premieres on Fox Kids.
- September 11 – Hurricane Iniki hits the Hawaiian Islands, Kauai and Oahu.
- September 12 – STS-47: Dr. Mae Jemison becomes the first African American woman to travel into space, aboard the Space Shuttle Endeavour.
- September 23 – Operation Julin is the last nuclear test conducted by the United States at the Nevada Test Site.
- September 24
  - The Kentucky Supreme Court, in Kentucky v. Wasson, holds that laws criminalizing same-sex sodomy are unconstitutional, and accurately predicts that other states and the nation will eventually rule the same way.
  - The Sci-Fi Channel launches with a broadcast of Star Wars.

=== October ===
- October 1 – The Turner Broadcasting System's Cartoon Network goes on the air. The Merrie Melodies short, Rhapsody Rabbit, is the very first cartoon to be broadcast on the network.
- October 2 – Pittsburgh International Airport's new facility opens in Findlay Township, near Pittsburgh, Pennsylvania. The new terminal is built as an expansion for USAir and an upgrade from the older Pittsburgh International Airport facility.
- October 3 – After performing a song protesting alleged child abuse by the Catholic Church, Sinéad O'Connor rips up a photo of Pope John Paul II on Saturday Night Live, causing huge controversy, leading the switchboards at NBC to ring off the hook.
- October 8 – The video game Mortal Kombat is released.
- October 9
  - The Chief of Naval Operations adopts the United States Navy's core values: Honor, Courage and Commitment.
  - A 13-kilogram (29-pound) meteorite lands in the driveway of the Knapp residence in Peekskill, New York, destroying the family's Chevrolet Malibu. It becomes known as the Peekskill Meteorite.
- October 11 – Ross Perot, Bill Clinton, and George H. W. Bush participate in the first debate of the 1992 election at Washington University in St. Louis.
- October 13 – Al Gore, James Stockdale, and Dan Quayle participate in the 1992 vice presidential debate.
- October 14 – The A Bunch of Munsch episode "The Paper Bag Princess" is first broadcast on Showtime for the Showtime's Fall 1992 lineup opposite of the series debut of American Heroes & Legends, as part of the network's hour long block of kiddie-oriented programming.
- October 15 – Carole Simpson hosts the second debate of the presidential election at the University of Richmond.
- October 17 – Yoshihiro Hattori, a 16-year-old Japanese exchange student, mistakes the address of a party and is shot dead after knocking on the wrong door in Baton Rouge, Louisiana. The shooter, Rodney Peairs, is later acquitted, sparking outrage in Japan.
- October 19 – Jim Lehrer hosts the final debate of the presidential election at Michigan State University.
- October 26 – Dry Tortugas National Park is established.
- October 29 – The Food and Drug Administration approves Depo-Provera for use as a contraceptive in the United States.
- October 31 – The pilot episode for X-Men airs on Fox Kids.

=== November ===
November 3: Bill Clinton elected U.S. president

- November 3
  - Governor Bill Clinton of Arkansas defeats incumbent President George H. W. Bush and businessman H. Ross Perot in the US presidential election.
  - The rap-metal band Rage Against the Machine releases their self-titled debut album.
- November 20 – Home Alone 2: Lost in New York is released to theaters.
- November 24 – Sonic The Hedgehog 2 is released in the U.S.
- November 25
  - The Bodyguard, starring Kevin Costner and Whitney Houston, debuts in cinemas; it goes on to become the second highest-grossing film of the year with nearly $122 million in revenue in the U.S. and exceeding $410 million worldwide.
  - Walt Disney Pictures' 31st feature film, Aladdin, is released to critical and commercial success. It goes on to become the highest-grossing film of the year and (at the time) the highest-grossing animated film of all time, earning over $504 million worldwide – the first animated film to cross the half-billion-dollar mark. It is also the last entirely fairytale-based adaptation released by Disney until 2010's Tangled.

=== December ===
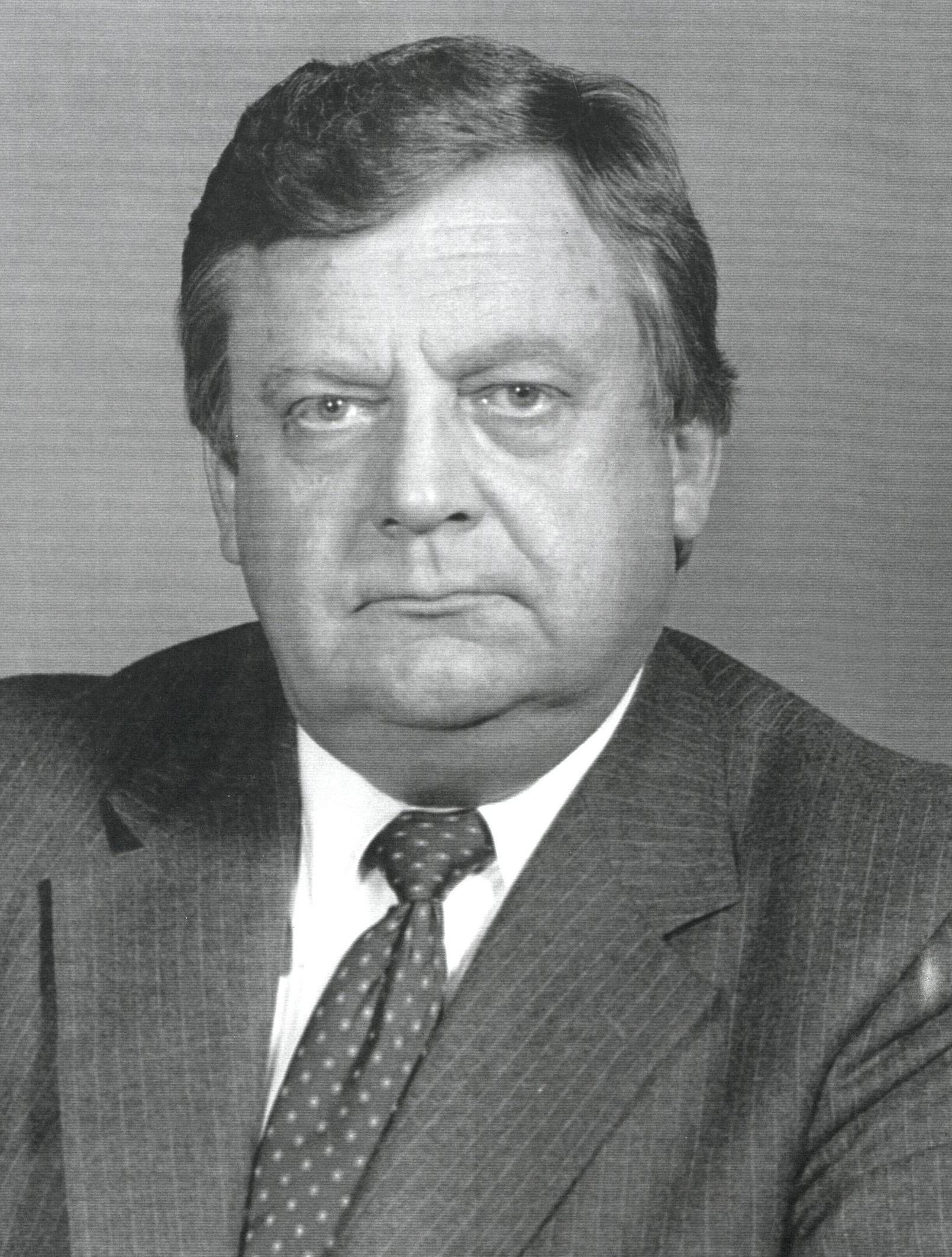
December 8: Lawrence Eagleburger becomes 62nd Secretary of State.

- December 3 – UN Security Council Resolution 794 is unanimously passed, approving a coalition of United Nations peacekeepers led by the United States to form UNITAF, tasked with ensuring humanitarian aid gets distributed and establishing peace in Somalia.
- December 4 – U.S. military forces land in Somalia.
- December 5 – Kent Conrad of North Dakota resigns his seat in the United States Senate and is sworn into the other seat from North Dakota, becoming the only U.S. Senator ever to have held two seats on the same day.
- December 8 – Lawrence Eagleburger is sworn in as the new Secretary of State, succeeding James Baker.
- December 15 – Hip hop producer and rapper Dr. Dre releases his solo debut studio album The Chronic, which sparks the beginning of the mainstream popularity and success of Gangsta Rap, G-Funk and West Coast Hip-Hop in the United States (a run that lasts from the early-to-mid-1990s).
- December 24 – President of the United States George H. W. Bush pardons six national security officials implicated in the Iran–Contra affair of the 1980s, including Caspar Weinberger.
- December 28 – First of four child deaths resulting from the Jack in the Box E. coli outbreak.

=== Date unknown ===
- In terms of units sold, compact discs outsell audiocassettes for the first time in the United States.

=== Ongoing ===
- Iraqi no-fly zones (1991–2003)

== Births ==
=== January ===
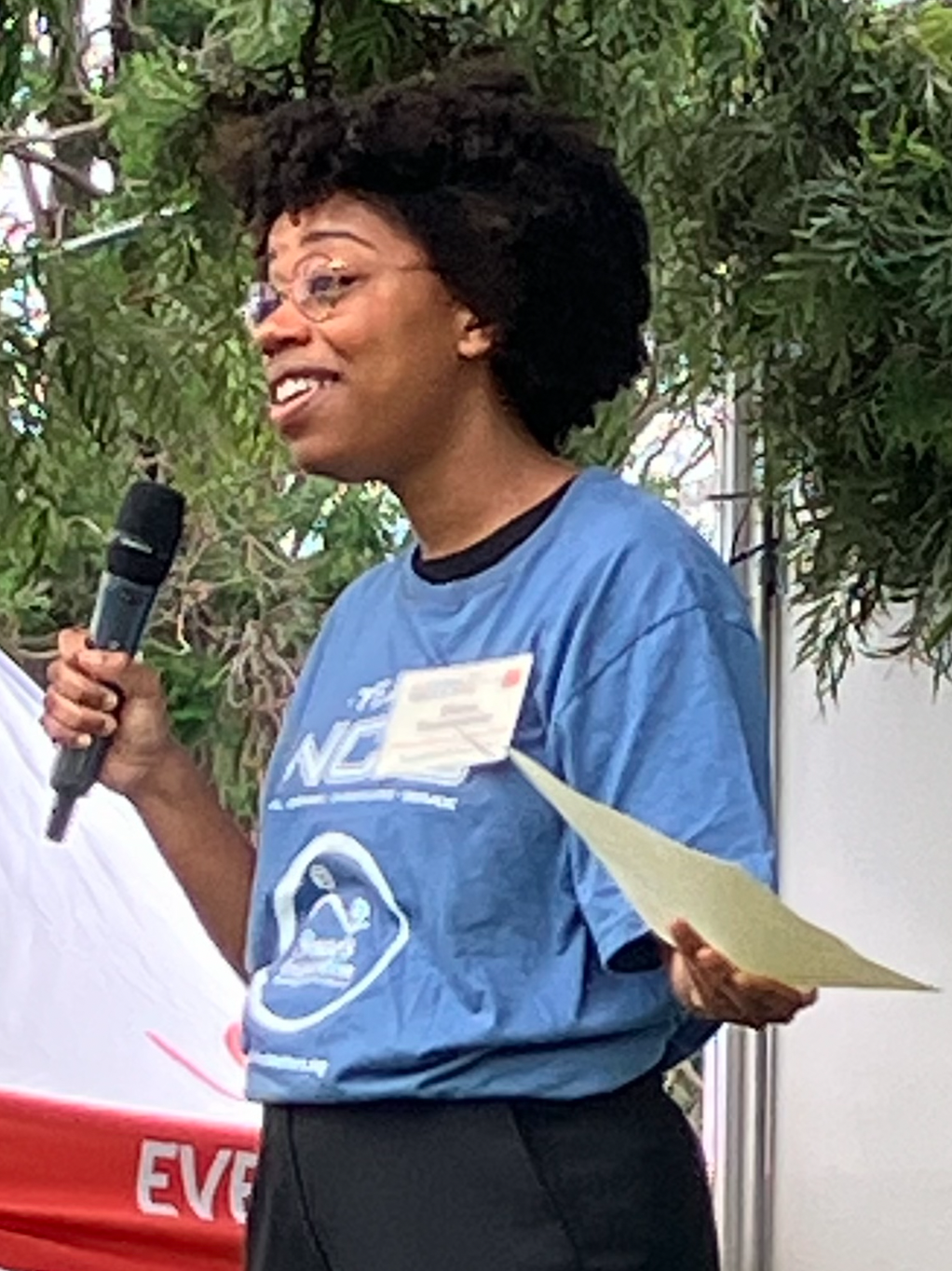
Diona Reasonover

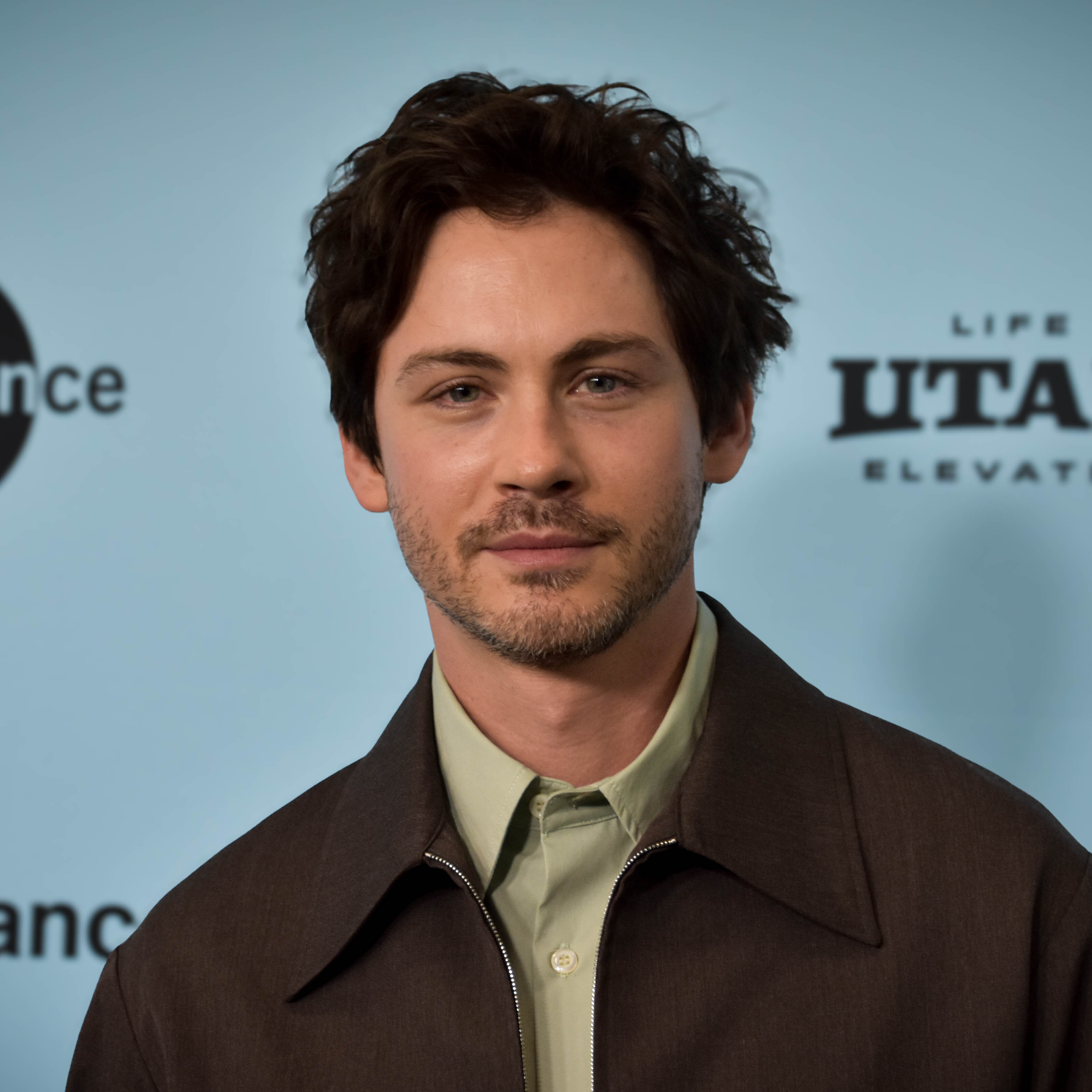
Logan Lerman

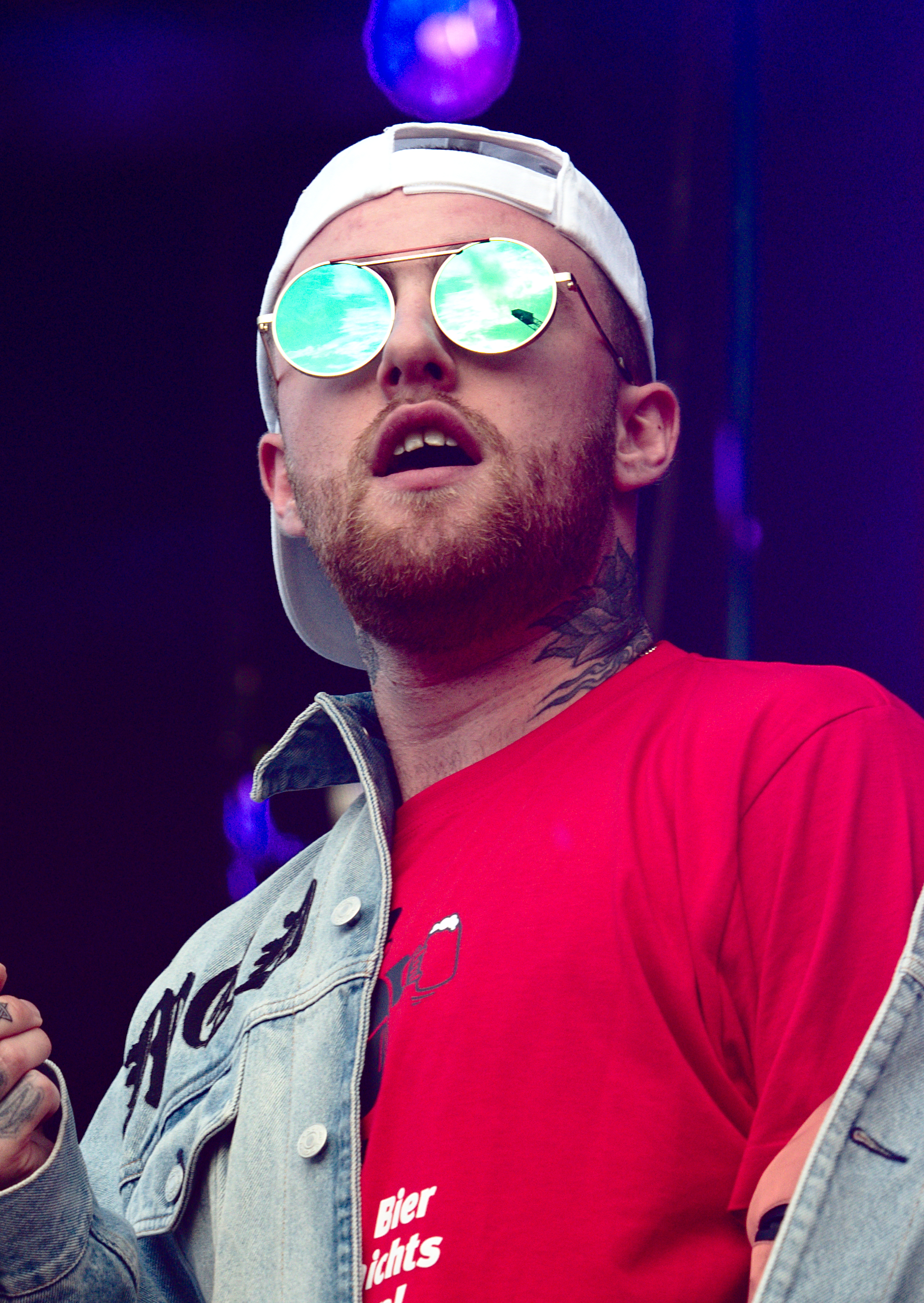
Mac Miller

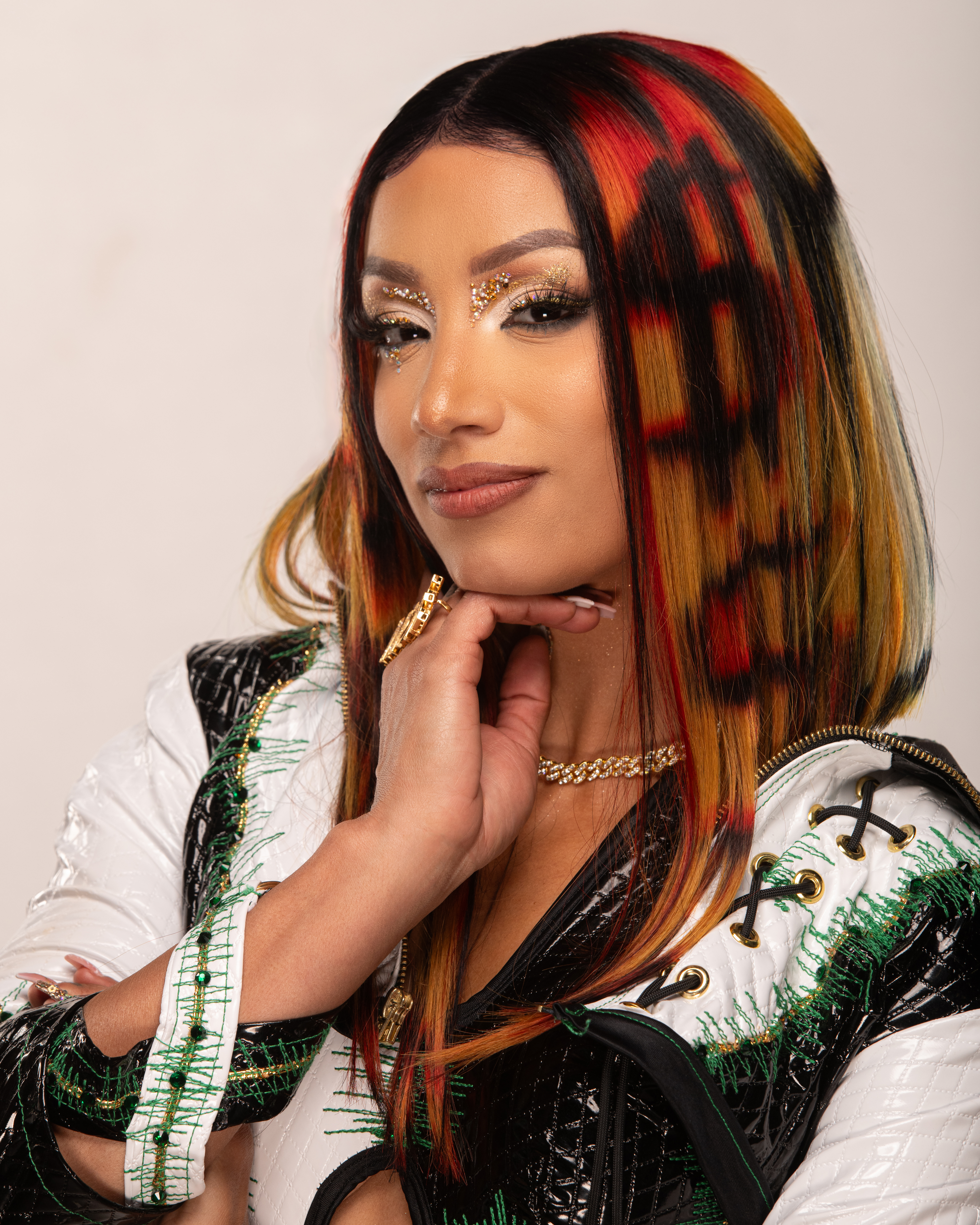
Mercedes Moné

- January 1
  - Kaitlin Antonneau, racing cyclist
  - Jeff Godfrey, football player
  - Jamie Lauren Keiles, writer
- January 2
  - August 08, musician (d. 2023)
  - Mychal Ammons, basketball player
- January 3 – Rob Crisp, football player
- January 6 – Diona Reasonover, actress
- January 8 – Valkyrae, YouTuber and livestreamer
- January 9
  - Jack Campbell, hockey player
  - Terrence Jones, basketball player
- January 11 – Audien, DJ and music producer
- January 12 – Javier Alvial, American-born Chilean footballer
- January 13 – Austin Watson, hockey player
- January 16
  - Juan Adams, mixed martial artist
  - Alexe Gilles, figure skater
  - Piper Gilles, American-born Canadian Olympic ice dancer
  - Will Sheehey, American basketball coach and former player
- January 18 – Dagny Knutson, swimmer
- January 19
  - Shawn Johnson East, artistic gymnast
  - Logan Lerman, actor
  - Mac Miller, rapper (d. 2018)
- January 20 – Jake Adams, pornographic actor (d. 2021)
- January 21
  - Seantrel Henderson, football player
  - Logan O'Brien, actor and singer
- January 22 – Jake Anderson, rugby player
- January 25 – Olivia Bonilla, singer/songwriter and musician
- January 26
  - Cassidy Lehrman, actress
  - Mercedes Moné, wrestler
- January 27
  - Emmanuel Andújar, basketball player
  - Tony Jefferson, football player
- January 28
  - Grace Dunham, writer and activist
  - Hunter Renfroe, baseball player
- January 29
  - David Fluellen, football player
  - George Pocheptsov, painter, draughtsman, and entrepreneur
- January 20 – Rico Abreu, racer
- January 31 – Colby Minifie, actress

=== February ===
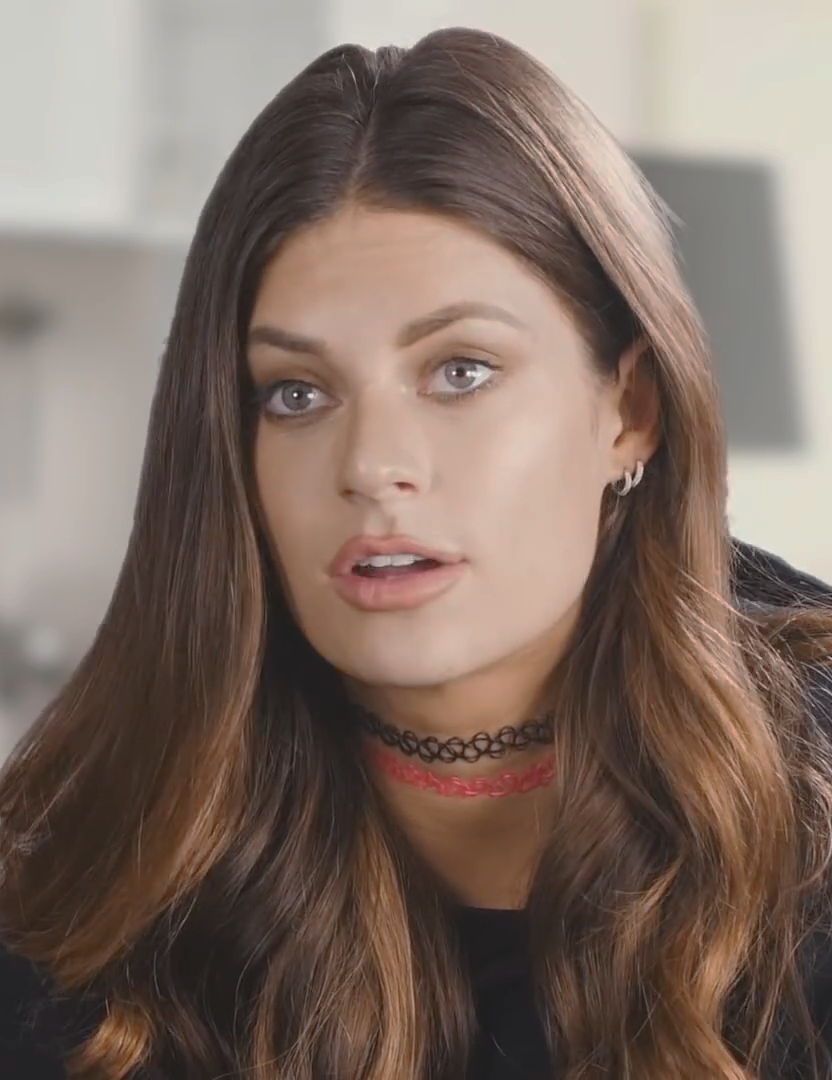
Hannah Stocking

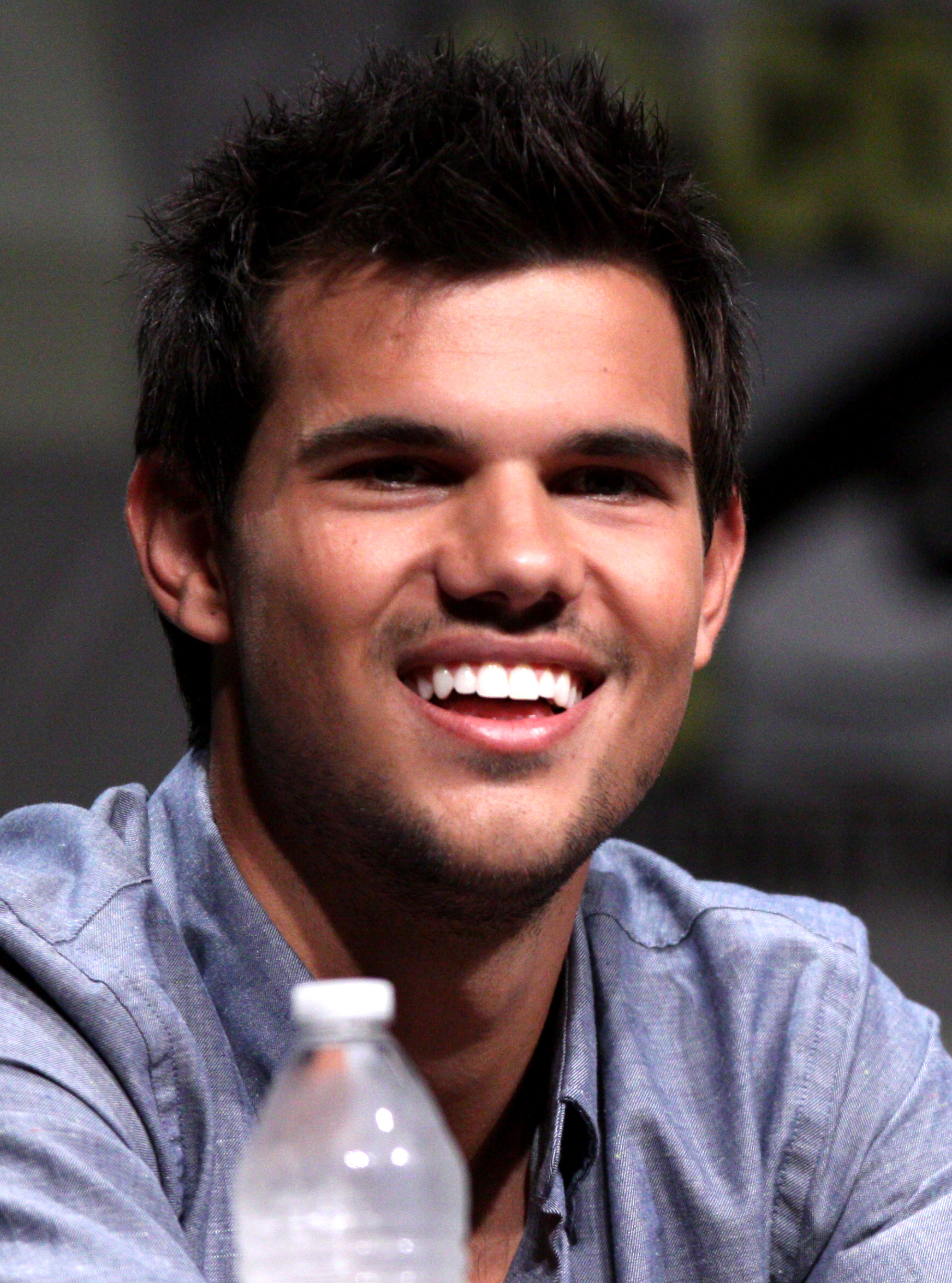
Taylor Lautner

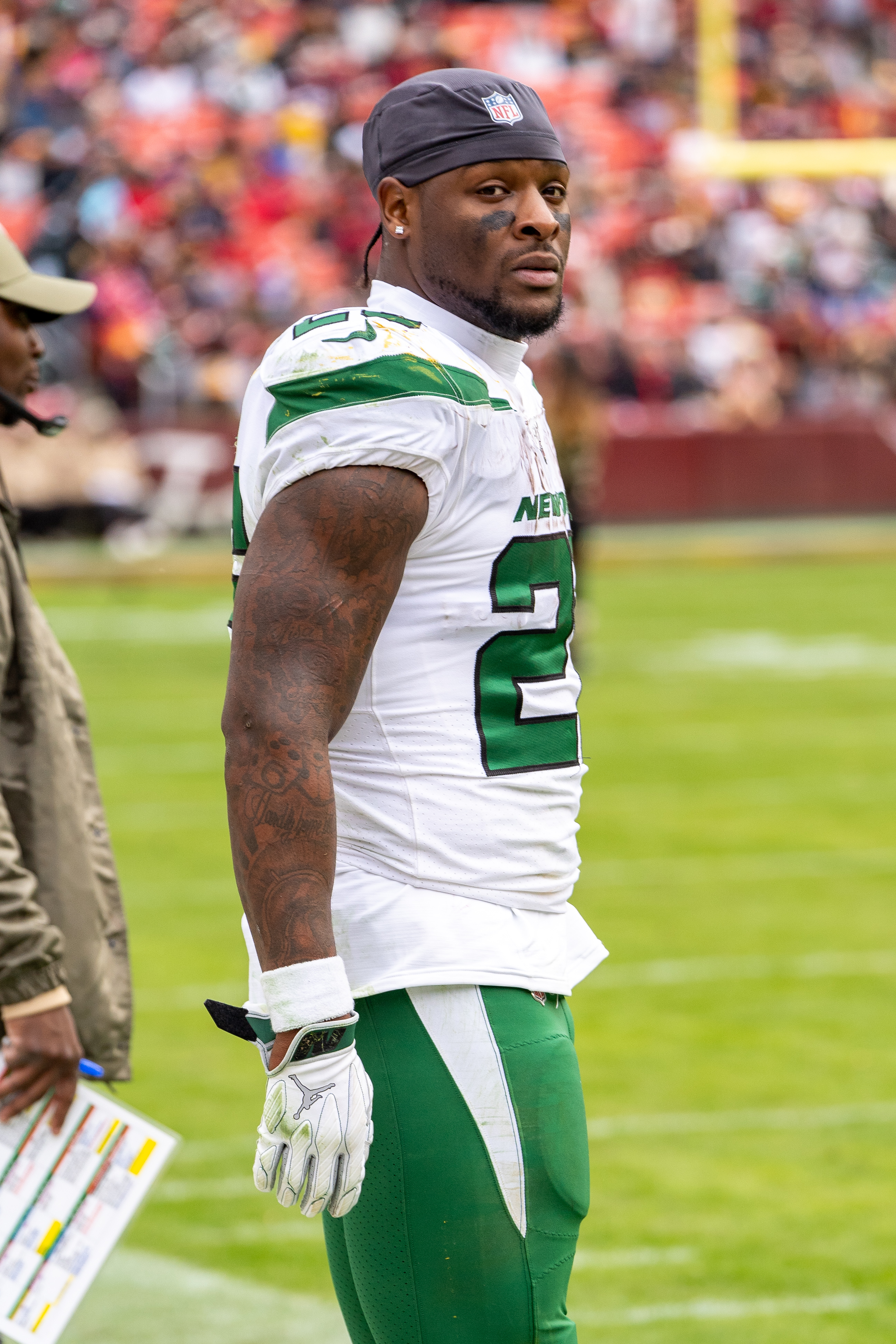
Le'Veon Bell

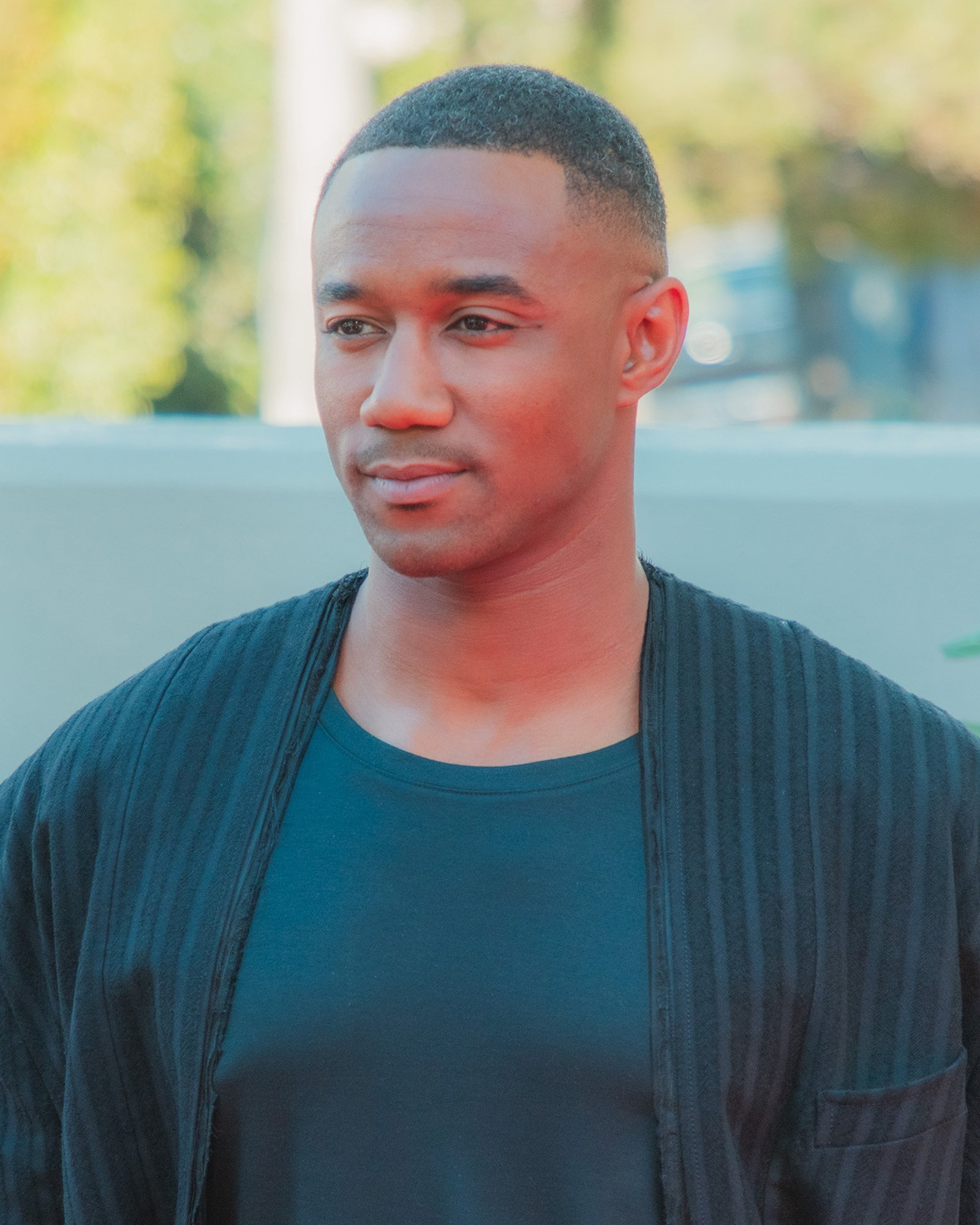
Jessie T. Usher

- February 1 – Kelli Goss, actress
- February 2 – Alex Kennedy, race car driver
- February 4 – Hannah Stocking, internet personality
- February 6
  - Tracy Abrams, basketball player
  - Kenneth Acker, football player
  - Cara McCollum, journalist (d. 2016)
- February 8 – Karle Warren, actress
- February 10
  - Karen Fukuhara, actress
  - Jordan Maron, YouTuber
- February 11 – Taylor Lautner, actor
- February 13
  - McKenzie Adams, volleyball player
  - Keith Appling, college basketball player
- February 14 – Jeff Luc, football player
- February 15
  - Lance Anoa'i, wrestler
  - Greer Grammer, actress
- February 16 – Steffani Brass, actress
- February 17
  - Laivan Greene, actress, singer, and dancer
  - Meaghan Jette Martin, actress and singer
- February 18
  - Le'Veon Bell, football player
  - Logan Miller, actor and musician
  - Allie Beth Stuckey, political commentator
- February 20 – Jarred Tinordi, hockey player
- February 22 – Aella, writer
- February 24 – Peter Frenette, Olympic ski jumper
- February 25
  - Max Aaron, figure skater
  - O'Karo Akamune, American-born Nigerian basketball player
  - Mario Alford, football player
- February 26 – Alexandria Mills, beauty pageant winner
- February 27
  - Ty Dillon, race car driver
  - Filip Krajinović, Serbian-born tennis player
  - Meyers Leonard, basketball player
- February 29
  - Perry Kitchen, soccer player
  - Jessica Long, Russian-born Paralympic swimmer
  - Caitlin EJ Meyer, actress
  - Majesty Rose, singer
  - Jessie Usher, actor

=== March ===
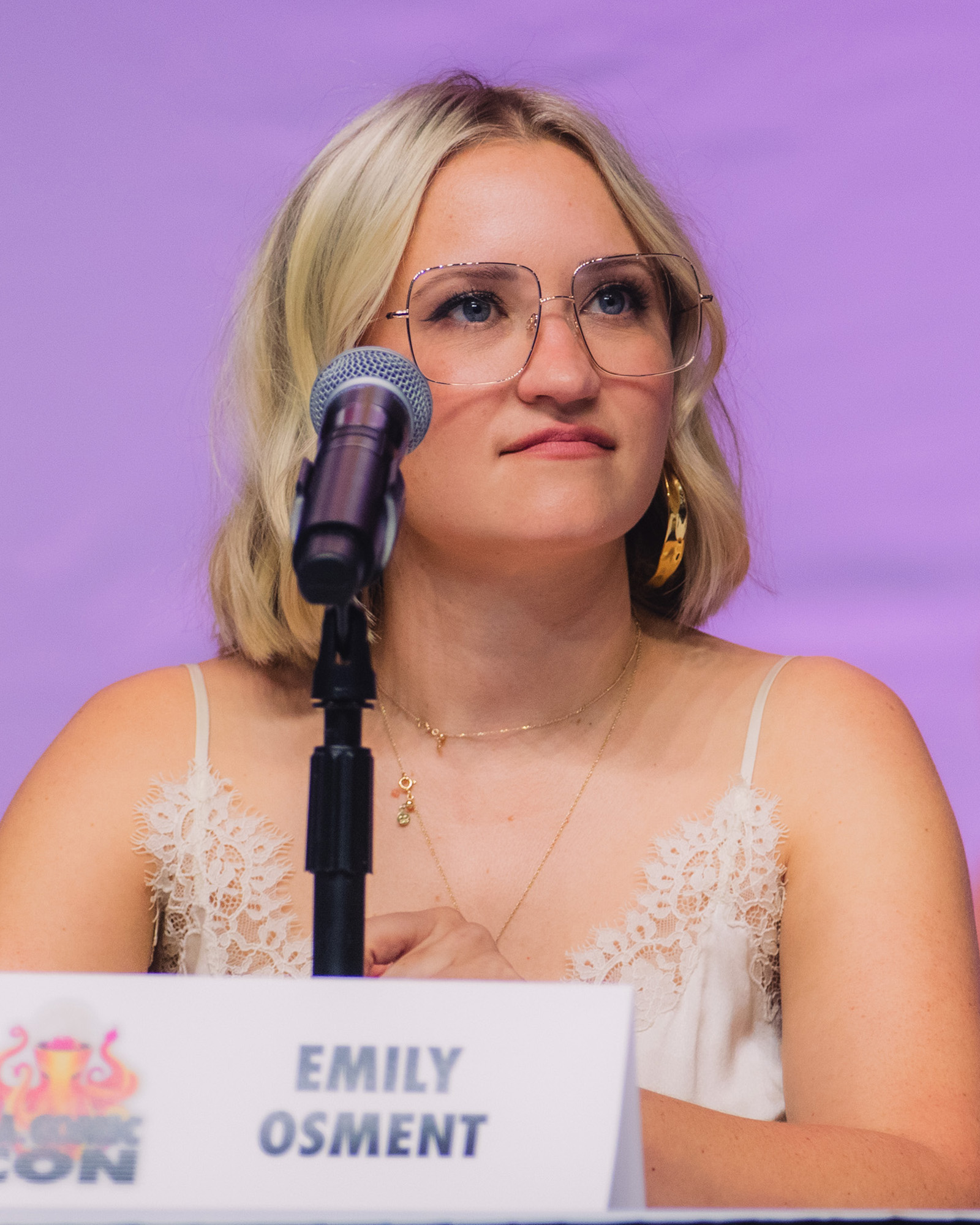
Emily Osment

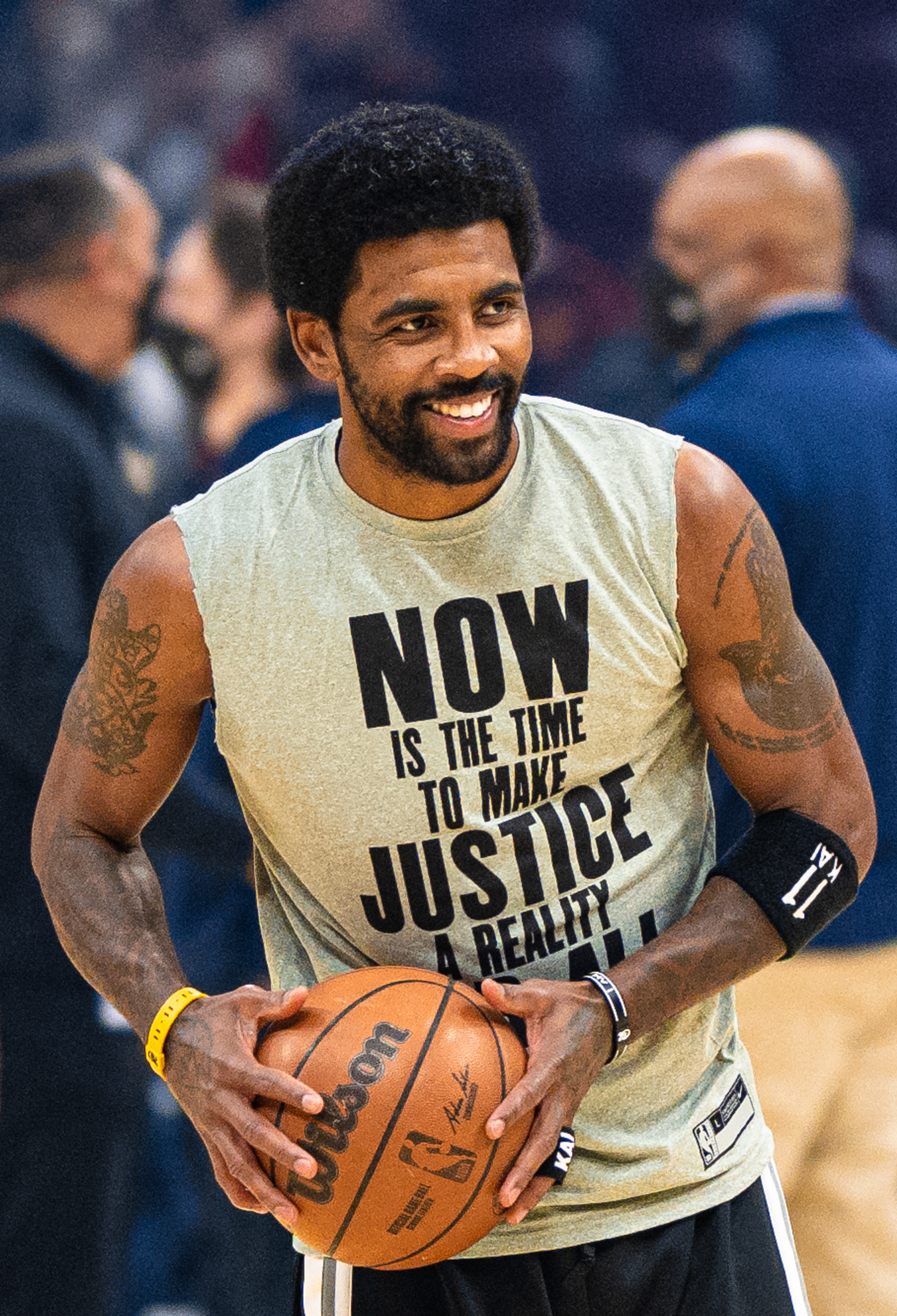
Kyrie Irving

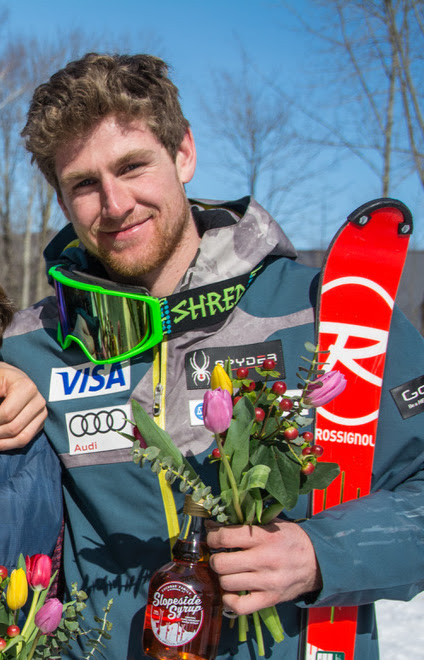
Ryan Cochran-Siegle

- March 2
  - Hunter Azure, mixed martial artist
  - Charlie Coyle, ice hockey player
- March 3 – Madison Cross, singer and actress
- March 4
  - Nick Castellanos, baseball player
  - Derek Forbort, hockey player
  - Jazmin Grace Grimaldi, daughter of Albert II, Prince of Monaco
  - Jared Sullinger, basketball player
- March 5
  - Kit Armstrong, pianist and composer
  - Taylor Averill, volleyball player
  - Sam Bankman-Fried, entrepreneur and fraudster, founder of FTX
- March 8 – Vitaly Zdorovetskiy, Russian-born YouTuber and prankster
- March 9 – Luis Armand Garcia, actor
- March 10 – Emily Osment, actress and singer
- March 13
  - AmaLee, singer
  - Jelani Jenkins, football player
- March 14 – Jasmine Murray, singer and pageant winner
- March 15
  - Sosie Bacon, actress
  - Mary Lou, actress
- March 16 – Tim Hardaway Jr., basketball player
- March 18 – Anthony Barr, football player
- March 20 – Madison Gesiotto Gilbert, attorney, beauty queen, and political candidate
- March 21 – Joshua Mance, Olympic sprinter
- March 22 – Jessie Andrews, actress
- March 23
  - Kyrie Irving, basketball player
  - Cameron Ontko, football player (d. 2026)
- March 24
  - Faye Gulini, Olympic snowboarder
  - MyCole Pruitt, football player
  - Jeremy Rosado, singer
- March 25
  - Kyan Anderson, basketball player
  - Elizabeth Lail, actress
- March 26
  - Mackenzie Caquatto, artistic gymnast
  - Corrie Lothrop, Olympic artistic gymnast
  - Haley Ramm, actress
- March 27
  - Kevin Kowalski, skateboarder
  - Ryan Cochran-Siegle, Olympic alpine ski racer
- March 29 – Chris Massoglia, actor
- March 31 – Tesho Akindele, Canadian-born soccer player

=== April ===
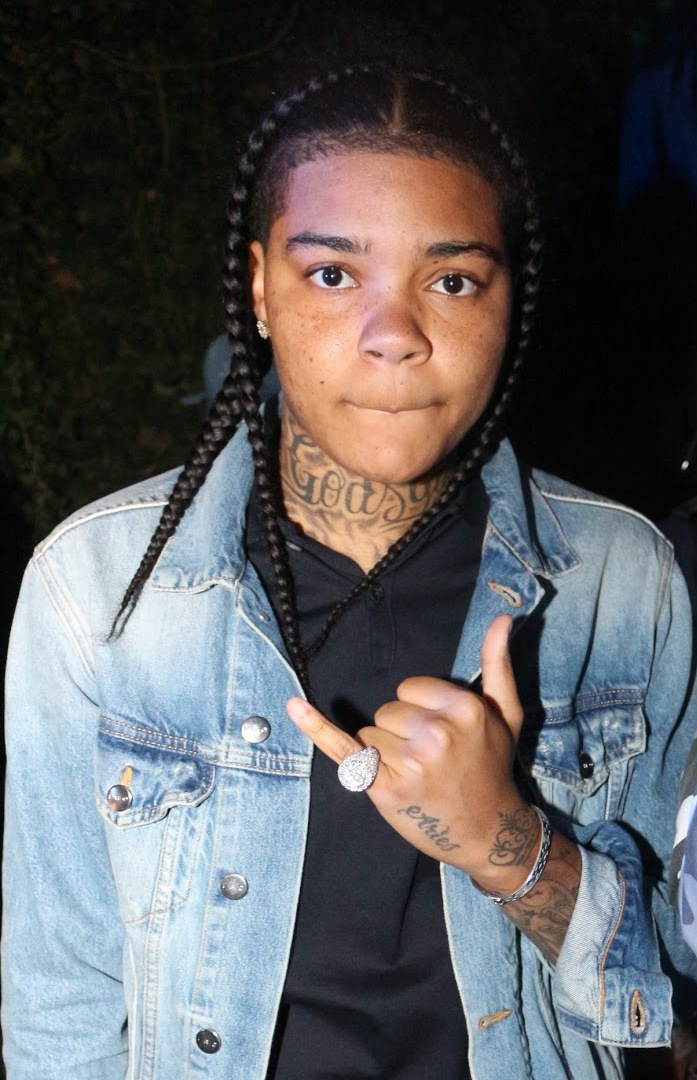
Young M.A

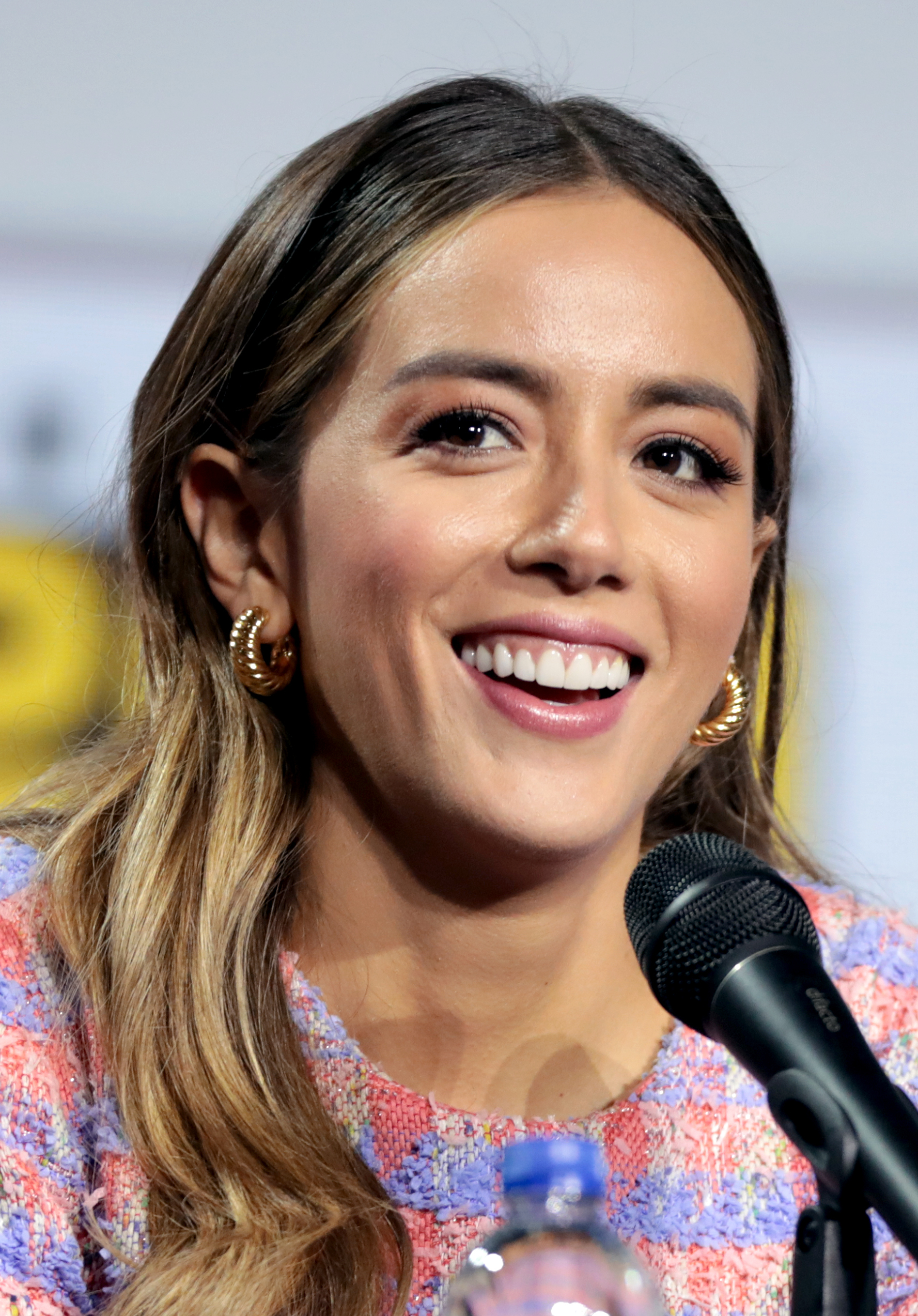
Chloe Bennet

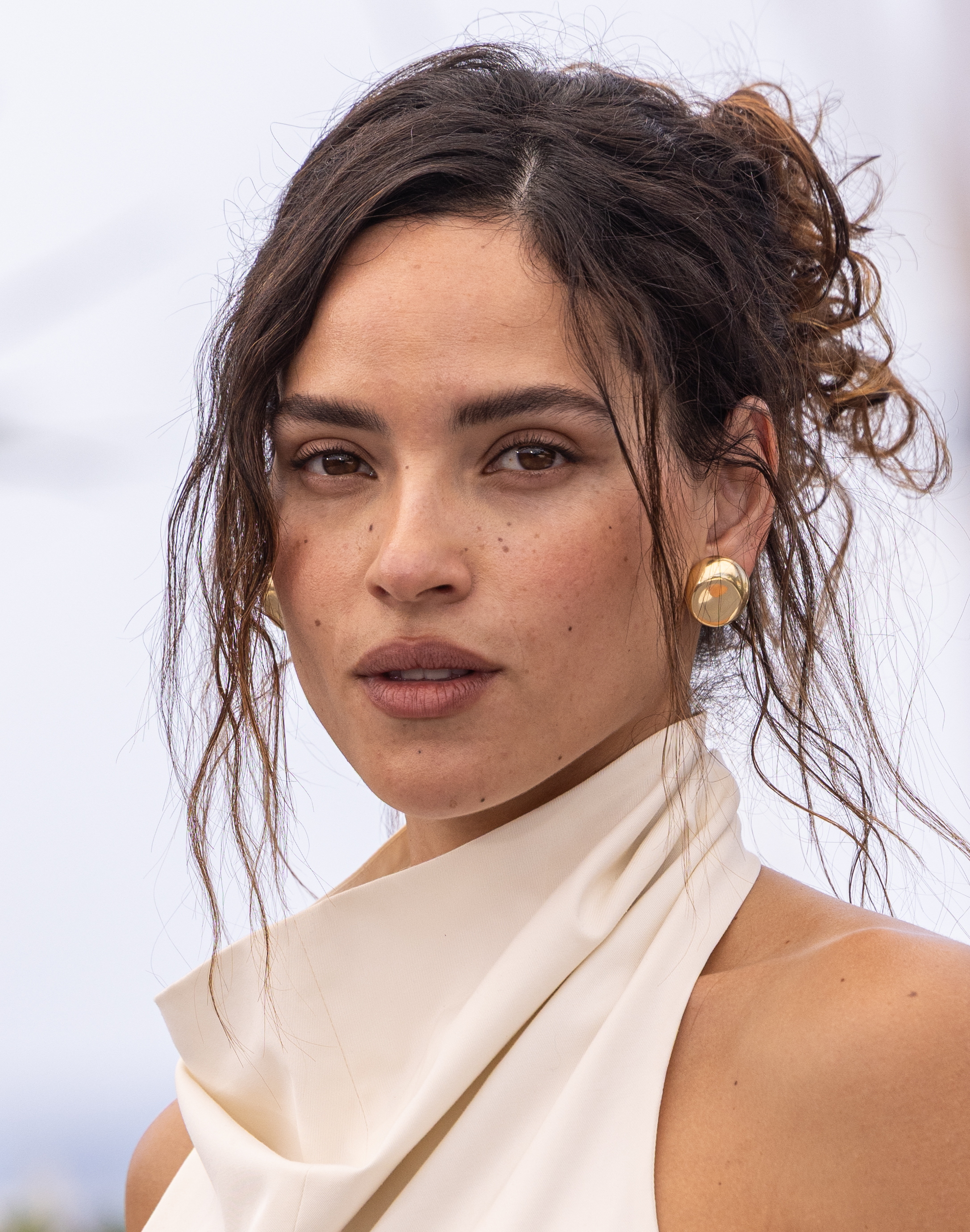
Adria Arjona

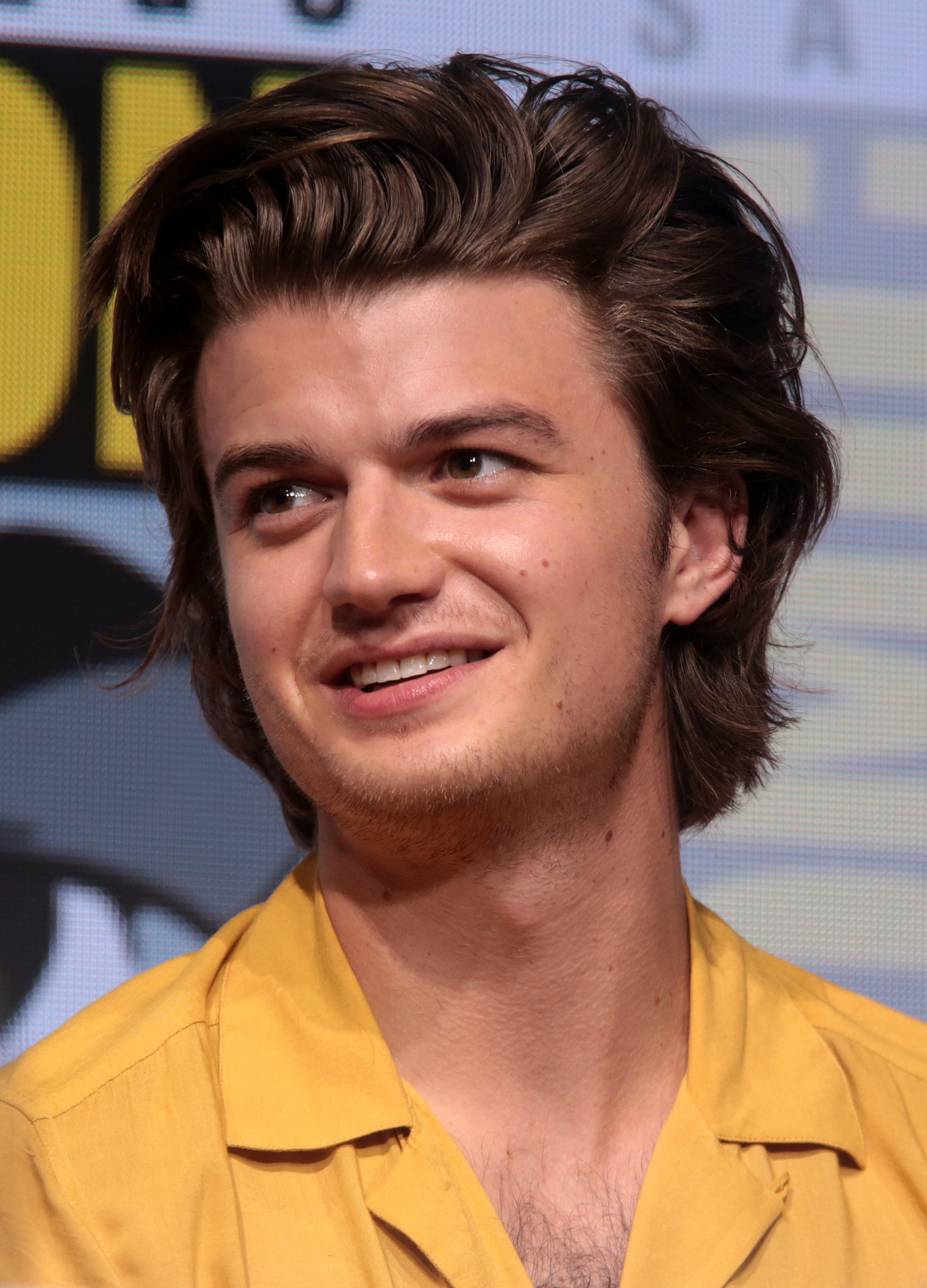
Joe Keery

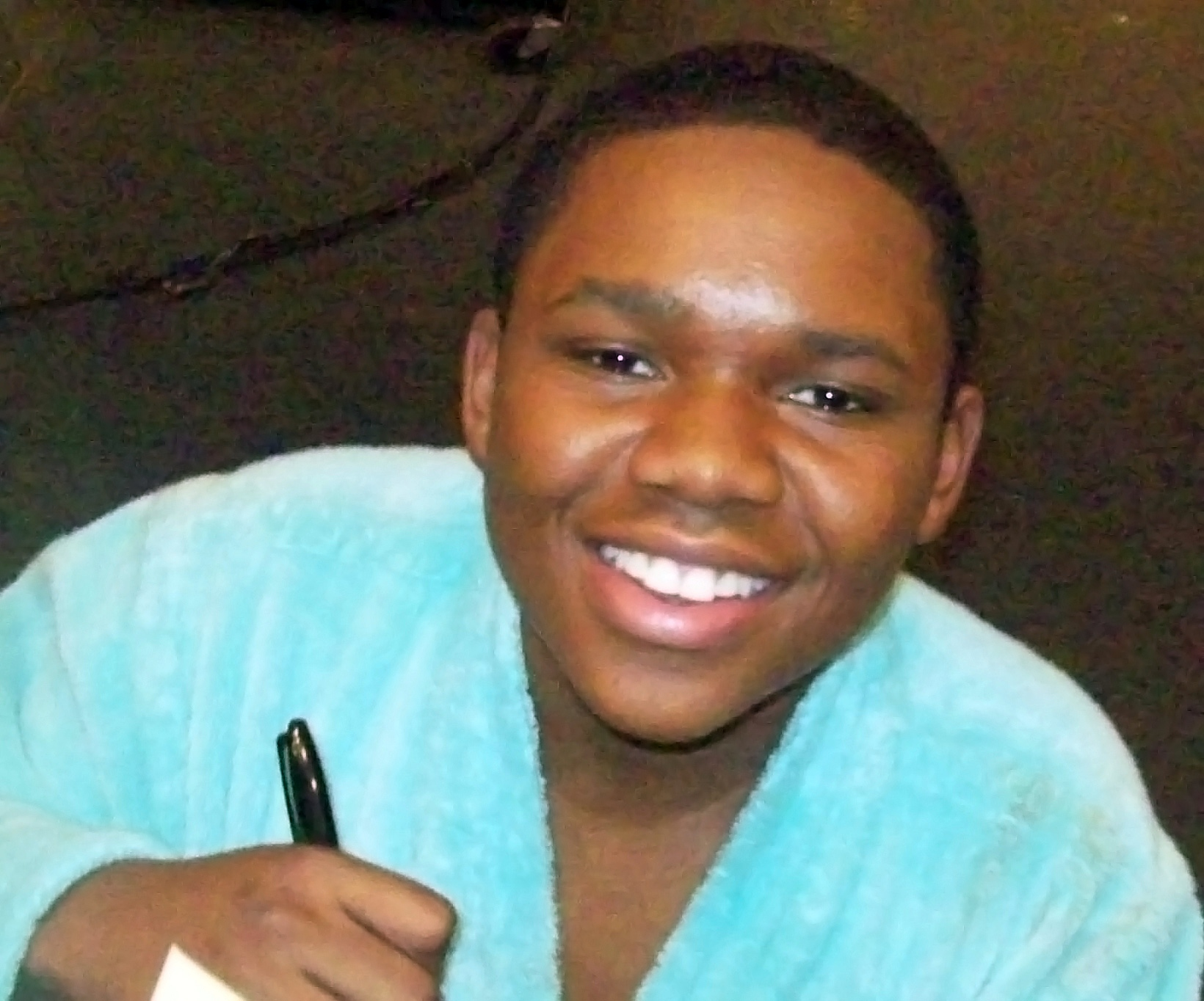
Doc Shaw

- April 3 – Young M.A., rapper
- April 4
  - Alexa Nikolas, actress
  - Serena's Song, Thoroughbred racehorse (d. 2026)
- April 5 – Jasmine Artiga, boxer
- April 6 – Beatrice Capra, tennis player
- April 7
  - Yassamin Ansari, politician
  - Kaitlan Collins, journalist
  - Alexis Jordan, singer and actress
- April 8
  - Darius Allen, football player
  - Matthew Freeman, twirler
  - Shelby Young, actress
- April 9 – Joshua Ledet, singer
- April 11
  - Tyrell Adams, football player
  - J.D. Lifshitz, director, producer, screenwriter, and actor
- April 13 – Paul Richardson, football player
- April 17 – Manuel Ávila, boxer
- April 18
  - Micah Ashby, boxer
  - Chloe Bennet, actress and singer
  - Jacob Fatu, wrestler
- April 19 – Jordan Akins, football player
- April 22
  - Adam Lanza, mass murderer (d. 2012)
  - Joc Pederson, baseball player
- April 23
  - Everton Blair, politician
  - Syd, singer, producer, and DJ
- April 24
  - Adria Arjona, actress
  - Joe Keery, actor and musician
  - Jack Quaid, actor
  - Doc Shaw, actor and rapper
- April 26
  - Jon Cozart, YouTuber
  - Aaron Judge, baseball player
- April 27
  - Keenan Allen, football player
  - Allison Iraheta, singer
- April 28 – Boxxy, internet personality
- April 30 – Kenneth Agostino, ice hockey player

=== May ===
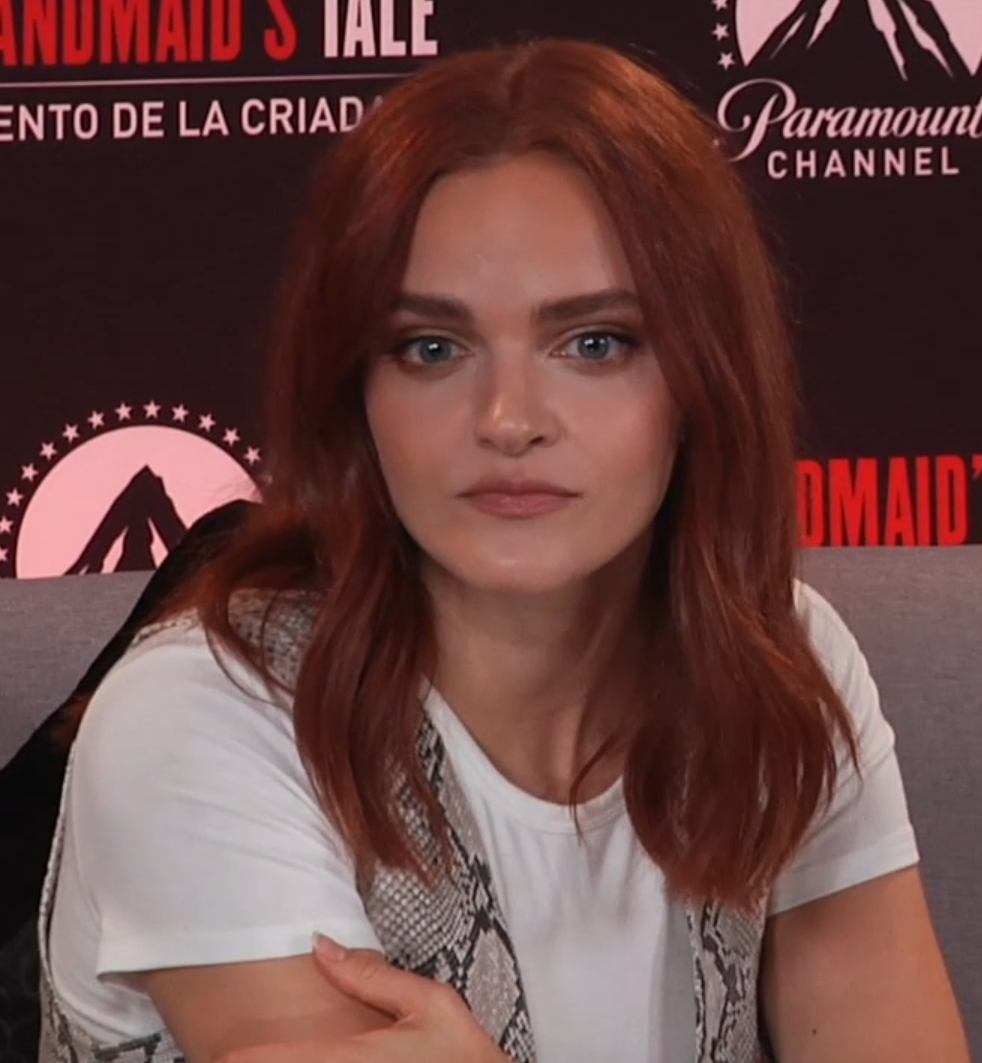
Madeline Brewer

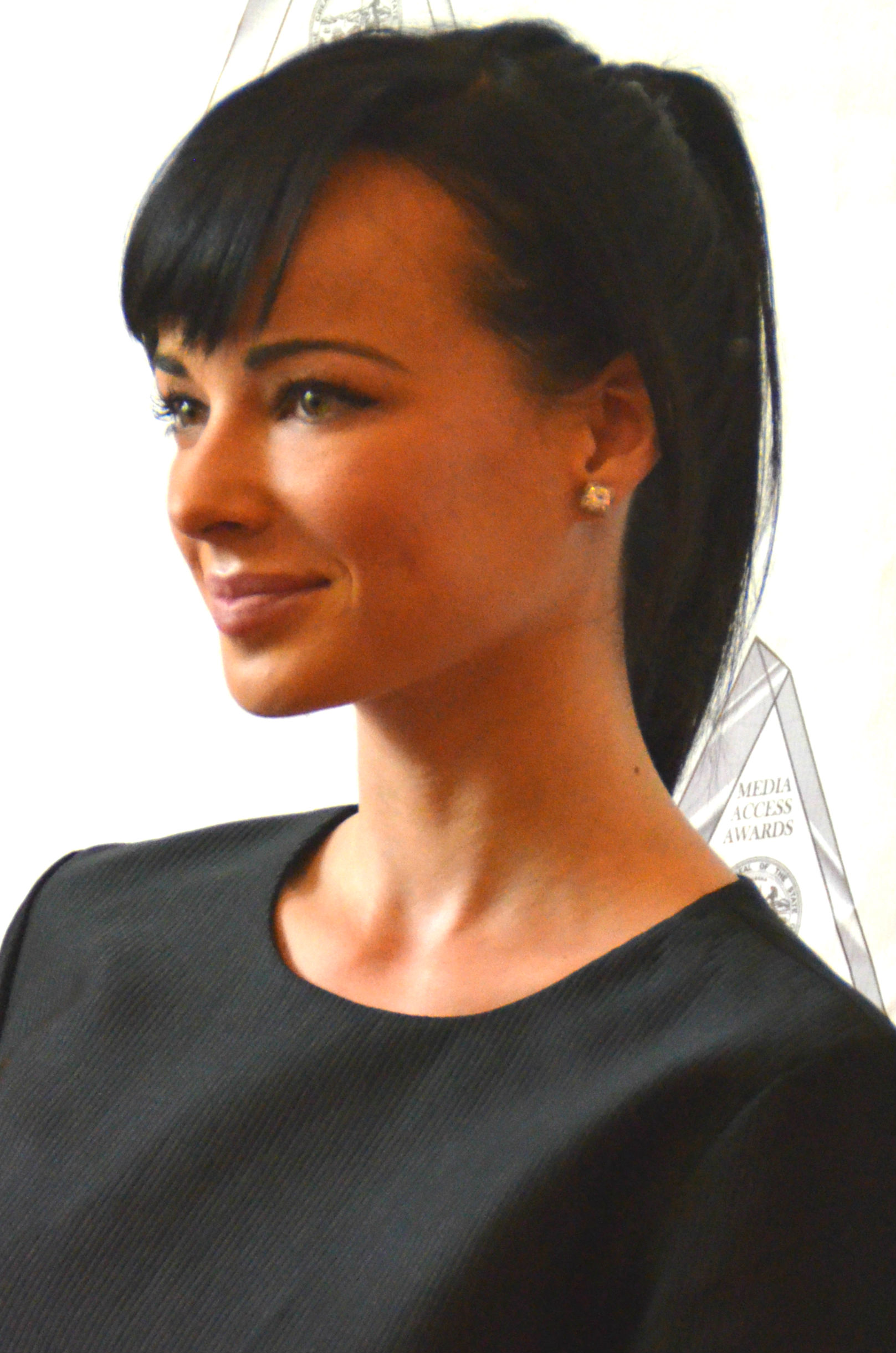
Ashley Rickards

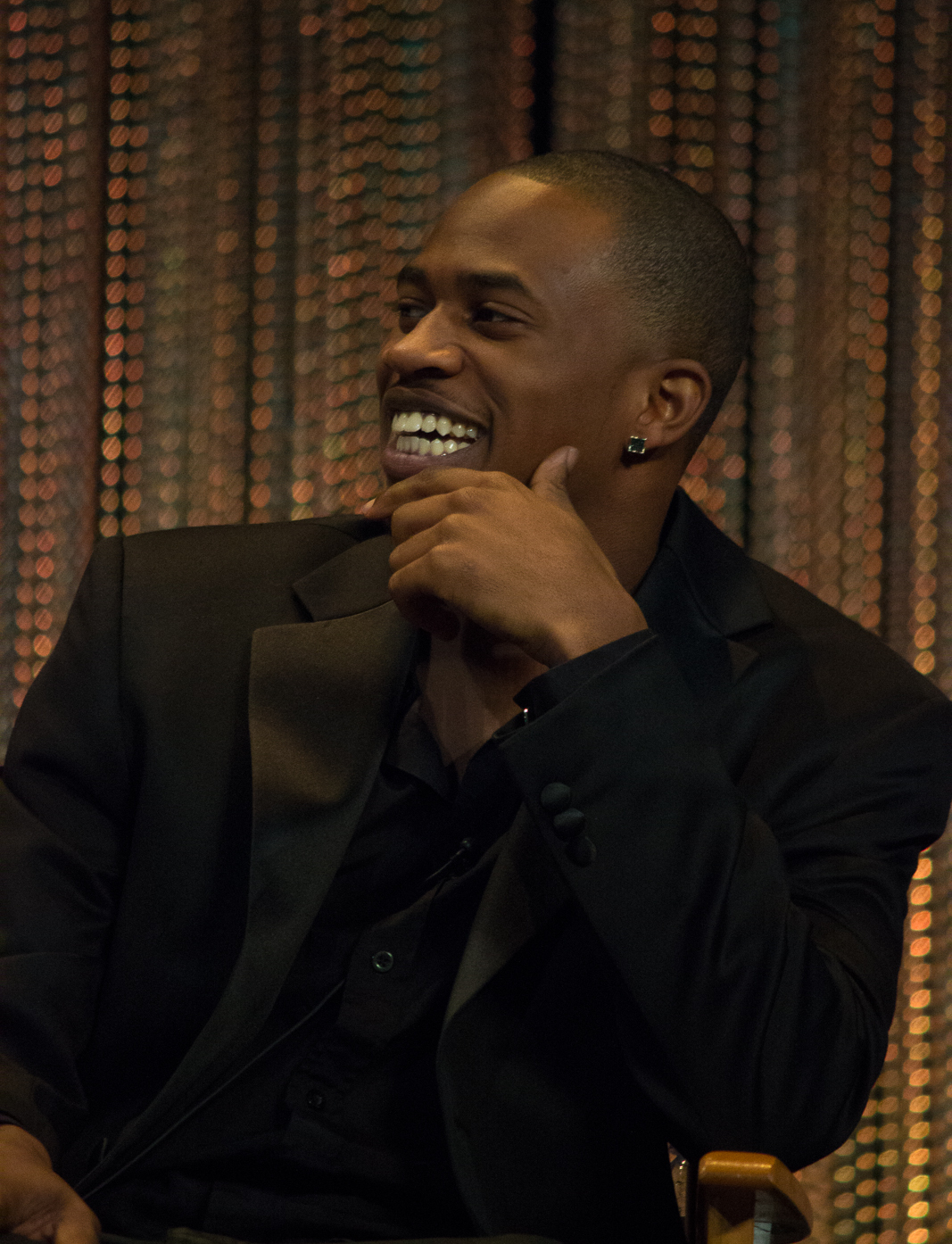
Malcolm David Kelley

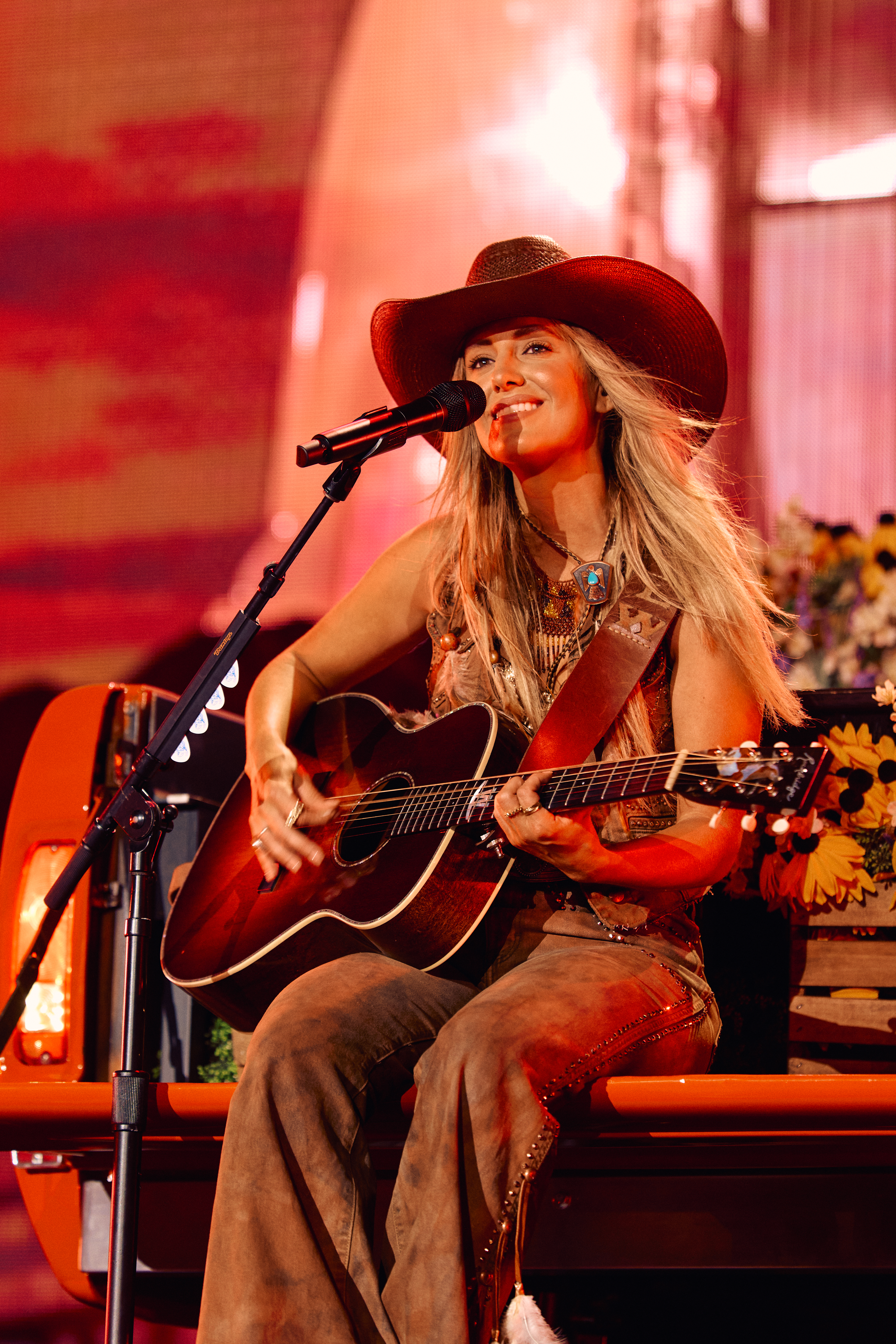
Lainey Wilson

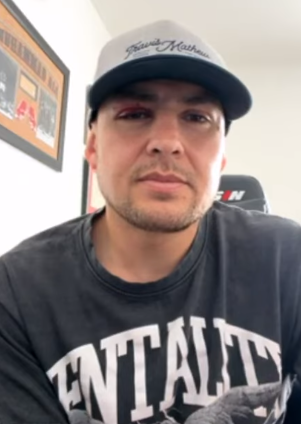
Steve Garcia

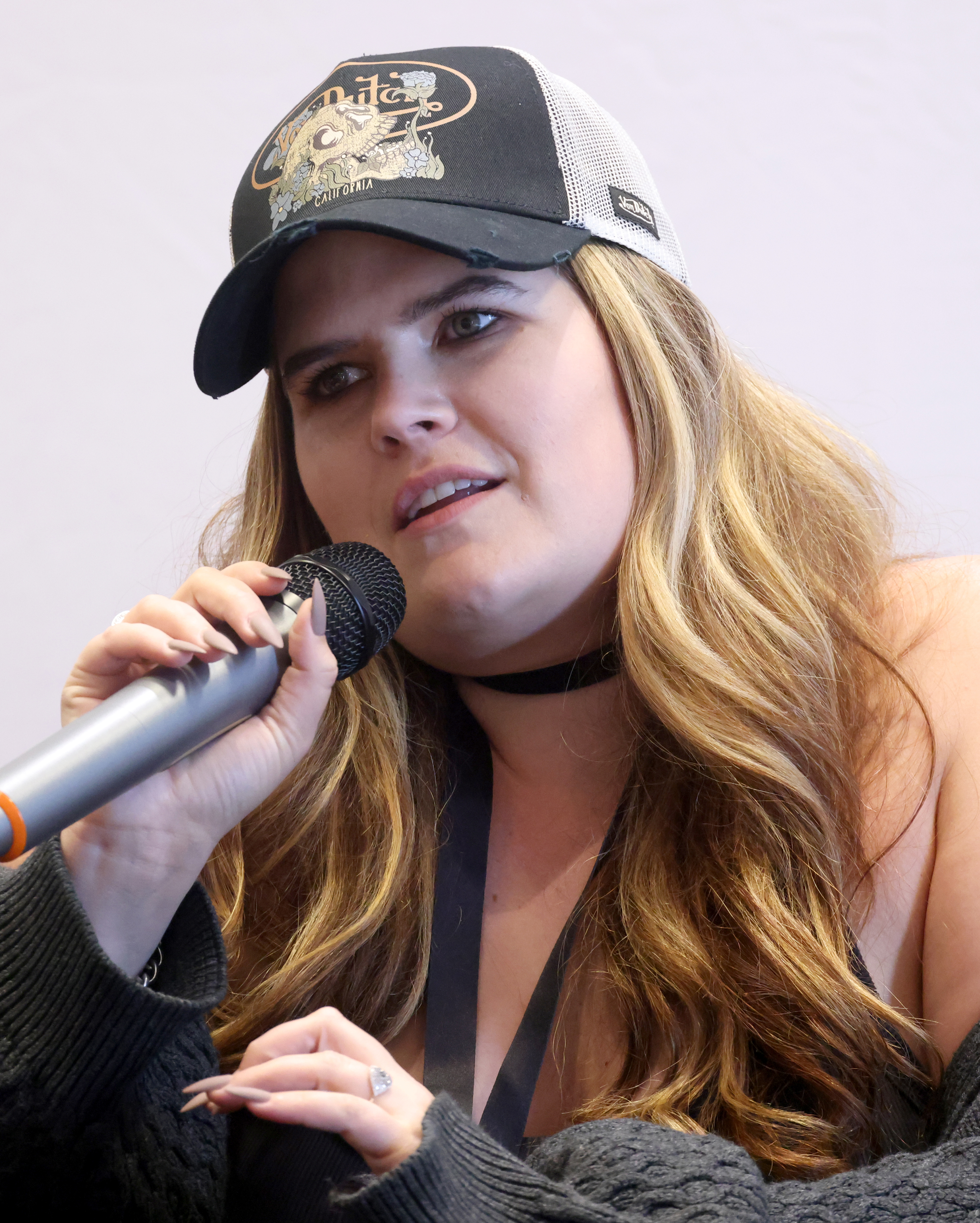
Erica Lindbeck

- May 1
  - Bryon Allen, basketball player
  - Madeline Brewer, actress
- May 2 – Molly Kearney, comedian
- May 4
  - Miles Robbins, actor and musician
  - Phyllis Francis, Olympic sprinter
  - Gracie Gillam, actress, singer, and dancer
  - Courtney Jines, actress, producer, and screenwriter
  - Victor Oladipo, basketball player
  - Grace Phipps, actress, singer, and dancer
  - Ashley Rickards, actress
  - Shoni Schimmel, Native American basketball player
- May 5 – Jarvis Johnson, YouTuber
- May 7 – Ryan Harrison, tennis player
- May 8
  - Olivia Culpo, beauty pageant
  - Kevin Hayes, hockey player
- May 9 – Chris Gutierrez, actor
- May 11 – Christina McHale, tennis player
- May 12 – Malcolm David Kelley, actor
- May 13
  - Bill Arnold, ice hockey player
  - Tyrann Mathieu, football player
- May 15
  - Clark Beckham, singer
  - José Benavidez, boxer
  - Grace Kelly, musician, vocalist, songwriter, arranger, and bandleader
- May 16
  - Kirstin Maldonado, a cappella singer and member of Pentatonix
- May 17
  - Caitlin Brunell, beauty pageant winner
  - Eric Jagielo, baseball player
- May 18 – Spencer Breslin, actor and musician
- May 19
  - Lainey Wilson, country singer/songwriter
  - Marshmello, DJ and record producer
- May 20
  - Enes Kanter Freedom, Swiss-born basketball player
  - Mattie Larson, gymnast
- May 21
  - Chloe Angelides, singer/songwriter
  - Hutch Dano, actor
  - Olivia Olson, actress and singer
- May 22
  - Anna Baryshnikov, actress
  - Steve Garcia, mixed martial artist
- May 24
  - Tommy Aquino, motorcycle racer (d. 2014)
  - Travis T. Flory, actor
- May 25
  - Kendall Coyne Schofield, ice hockey player
  - Matt Stonie, competitive eater
- May 26 – Johanna Long, race car driver
- May 27
  - Nick Alfieri, football player
  - Deedra Irwin, Olympic biathlete
- May 29
  - Melsahn Basabe, basketball player
  - Erica Lindbeck, actress
- May 30
  - Harrison Barnes, basketball player
  - Jeremy Lamb, basketball player
- May 31 – MO3, rapper (d. 2020)

=== June ===
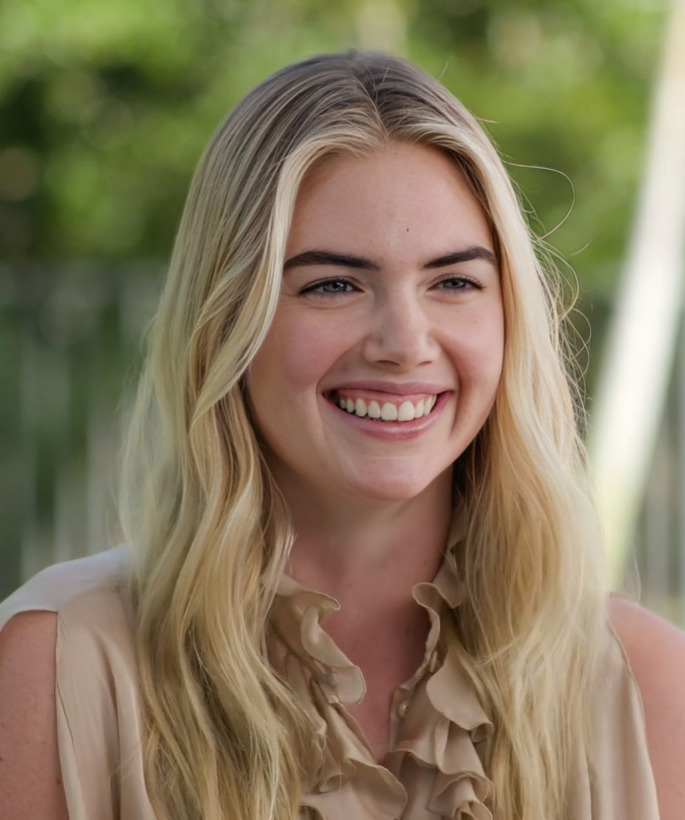
Kate Upton

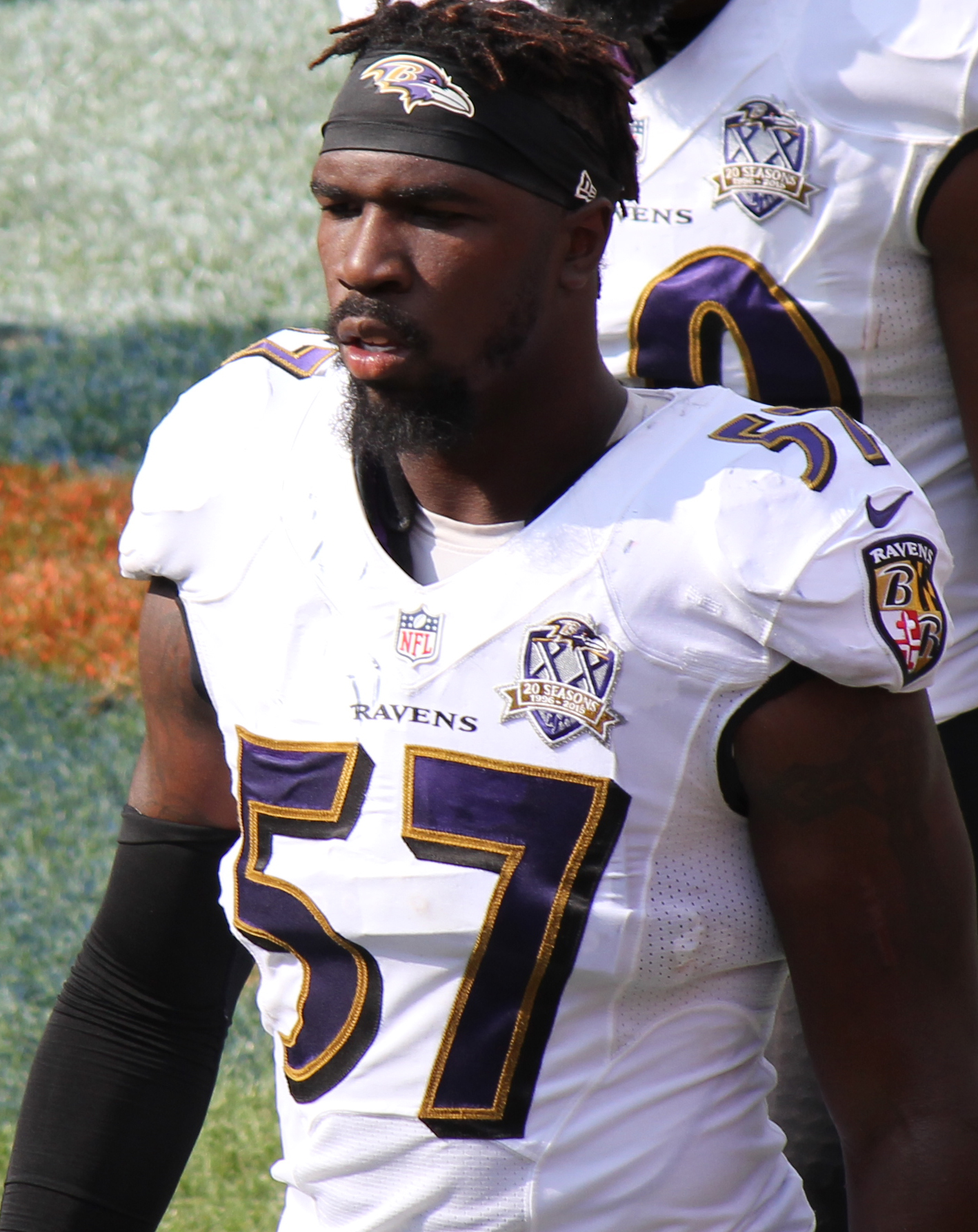
C. J. Mosley

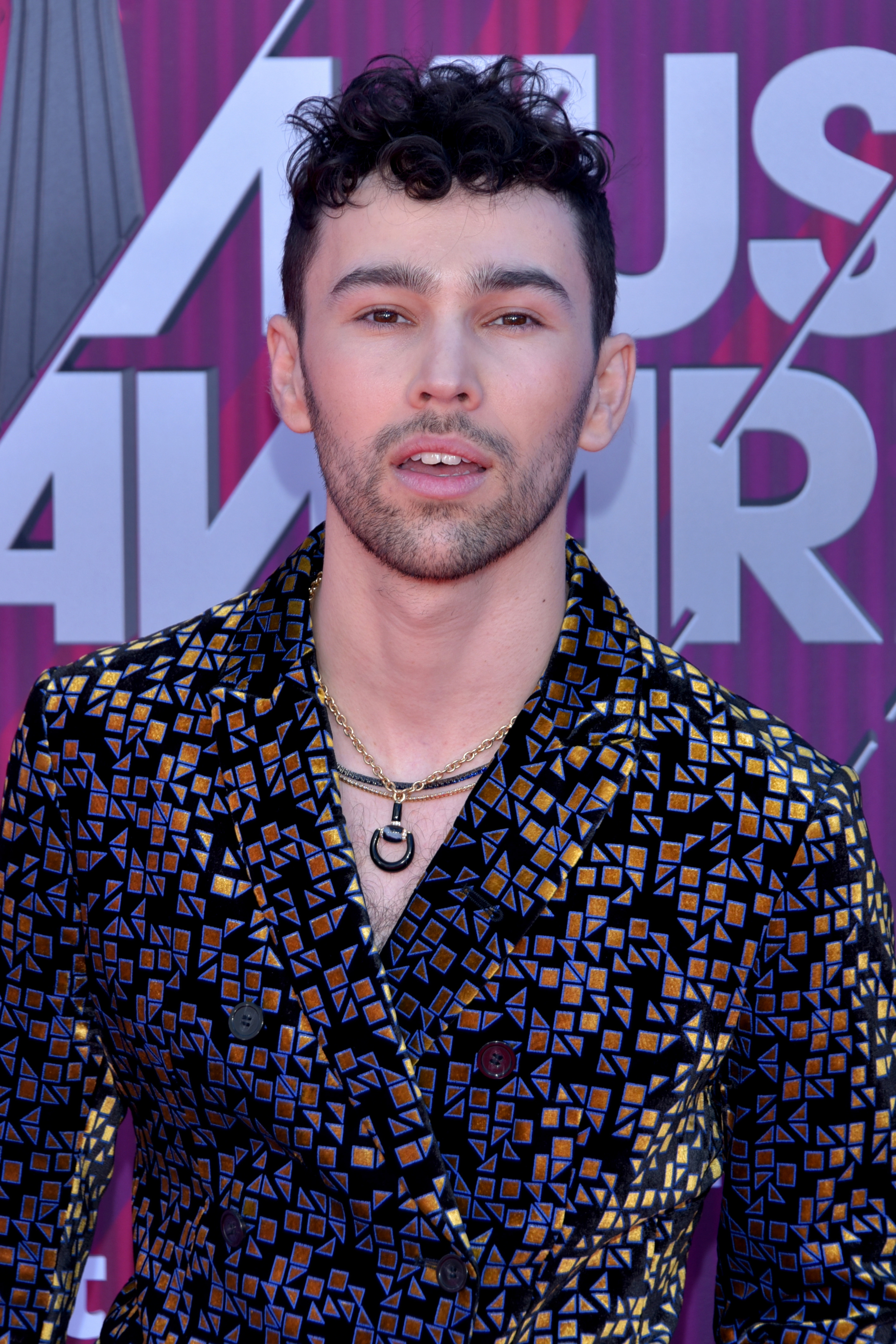
Max Schneider

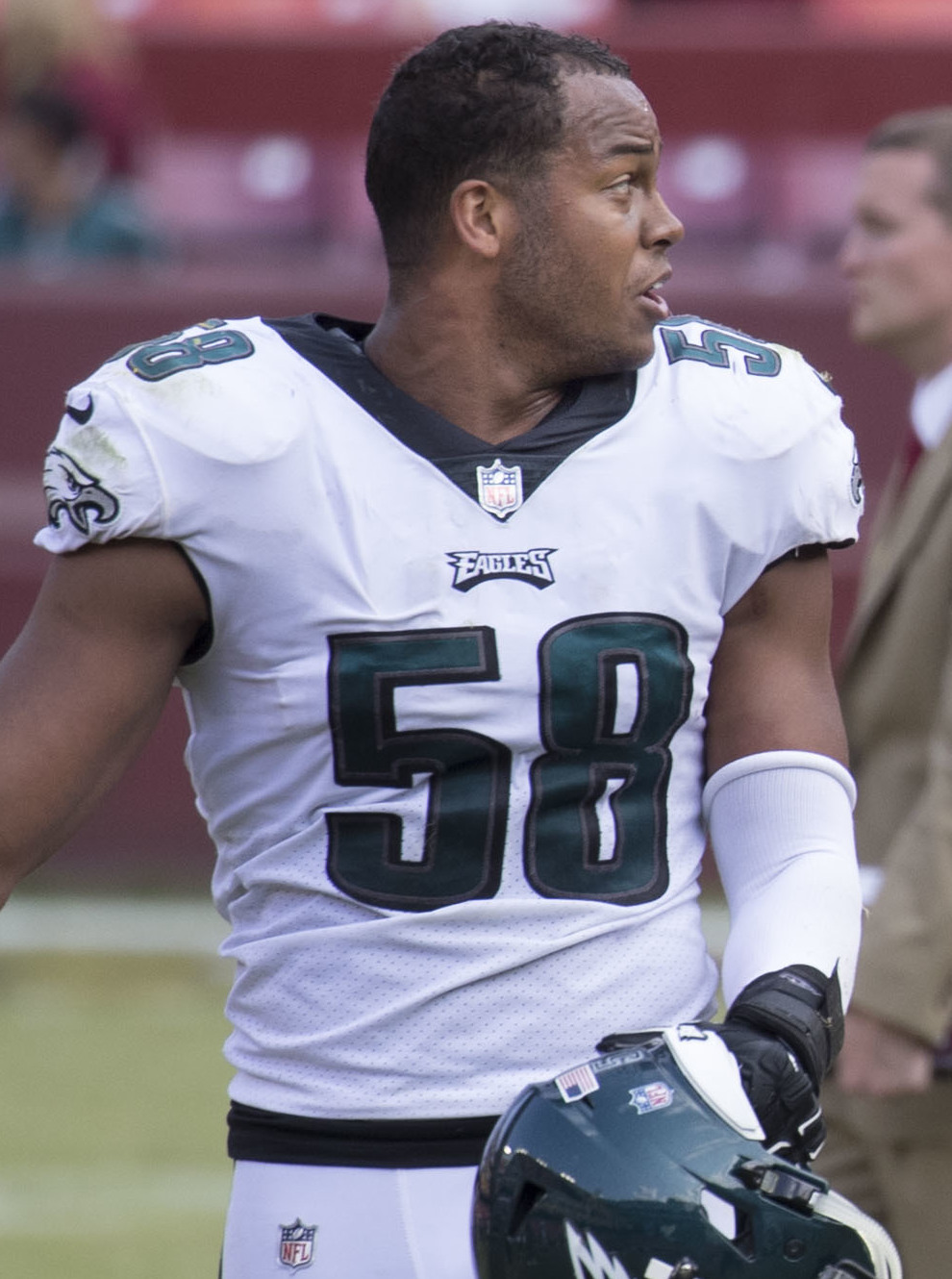
Jordan Hicks

- June 1 – Prezel Hardy, sprinter
- June 3 – Jade Cargill, wrestler
- June 4 – Saul Almeida, Brazilian-born boxer and mixed martial artist
- June 6
  - DeAndre Hopkins, football player
  - Paul Schommer, Olympic biathlete
- June 7
  - Sara Lee, wrestler and television personality (d. 2022)
  - Sara Niemietz, singer/songwriter and actress
- June 9 – Kate Hansen, luger
- June 10 – Kate Upton, actress and model
- June 12
  - Allie DiMeco, actress and musician
  - Ryan Malgarini, actor
- June 13 – Violet Chachki, drag queen, burlesque dancer, recording artist, television personality, and model
- June 14
  - 88Camino, Canadian-born rapper
  - Joel Crouse, singer/songwriter
  - Daryl Sabara, actor
- June 15 – Kristie Ahn, tennis player
- June 16
  - Rose Alleva, ice hockey player
  - Emerson Etem, hockey player
  - Donavan McKinney, politician
- June 18 – Caroline Allen, motorcycle racer
- June 19
  - Kelly Allen, Paralympic canoeist
  - C. J. Mosley, football player
- June 20
  - Robin Carpenter, cyclist
  - Sage the Gemini, rapper, songwriter and producer
- June 21 – Max Schneider, singer/songwriter and actor
- June 22 – Darius Jennings, football player
- June 23
  - Ikechi Ariguzo, football player
  - Kate Melton, actress
  - Bridget Sloan, Olympic artistic gymnast
- June 24
  - 6lack, R&B singer/songwriter
  - Raven Goodwin, actress
- June 25 – Justin Allison, stock car racing driver
- June 26
  - Jace Amaro, football player
  - Melanie Amaro, singer
  - Jennette McCurdy, actress
  - Austin Voth, baseball player
- June 27
  - Will Artino, basketball player
  - Jordan Hicks, football player
- June 28 – Joanne Reid, Olympic biathlete
- June 29
  - Adam G. Sevani, actor and dancer
- June 30
  - Oliver Anthony, singer/songwriter
  - Femita Ayanbeku, Paralympic sprinter
  - Holliston Coleman, actress
  - Prussian Blue, twin Neo-Nazi musicians

=== July ===
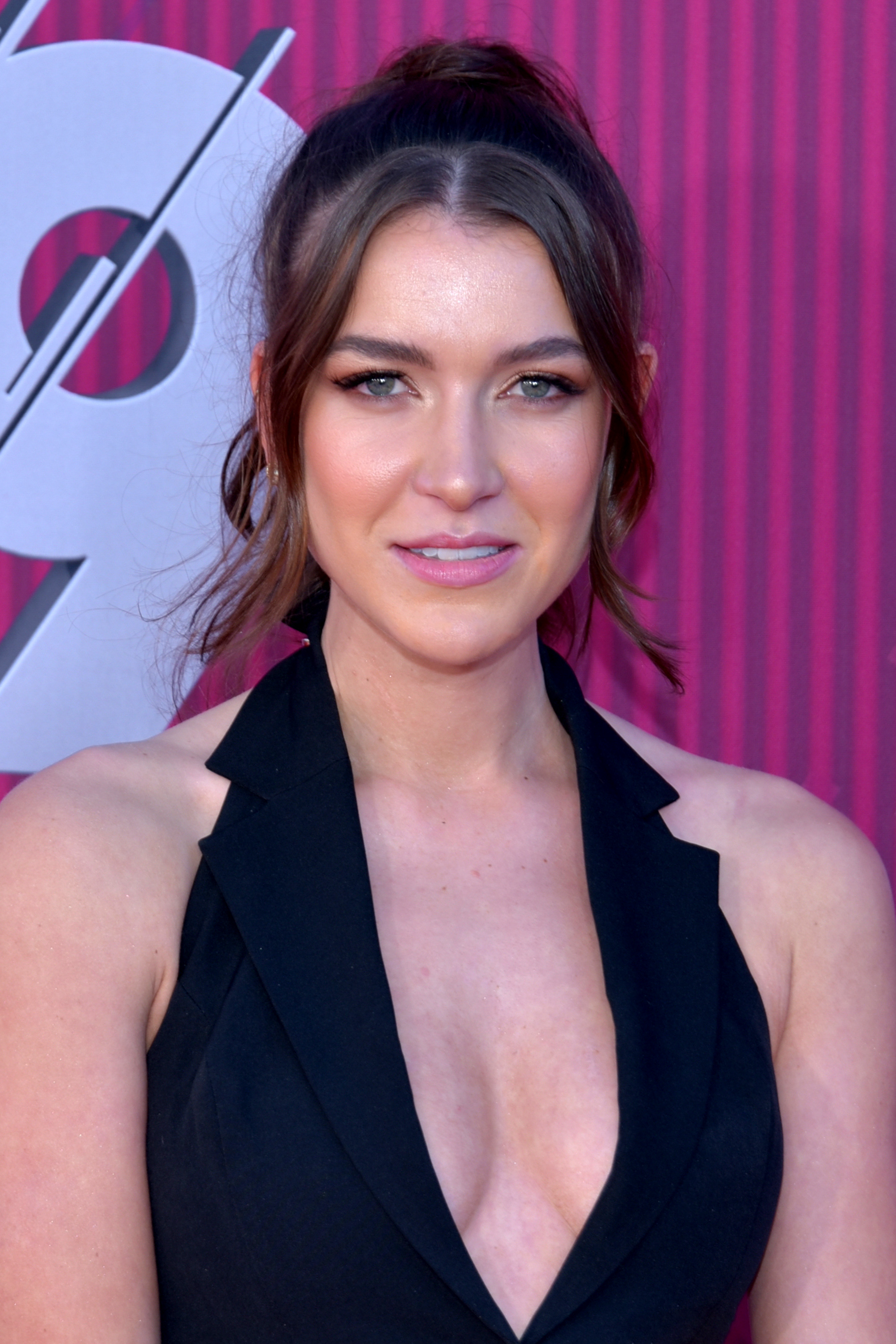
Nathalia Ramos

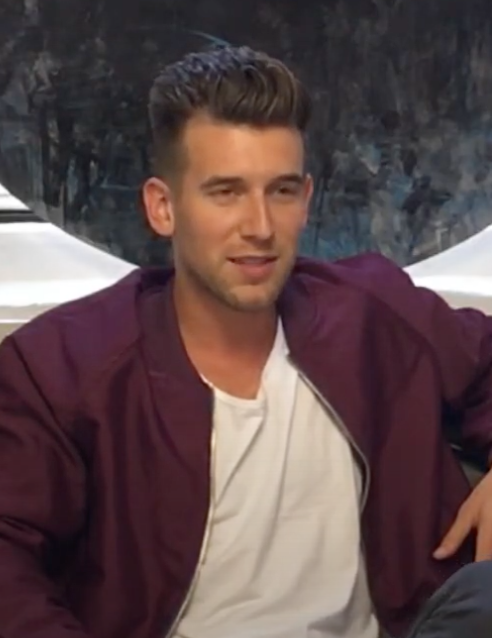
Max Frost

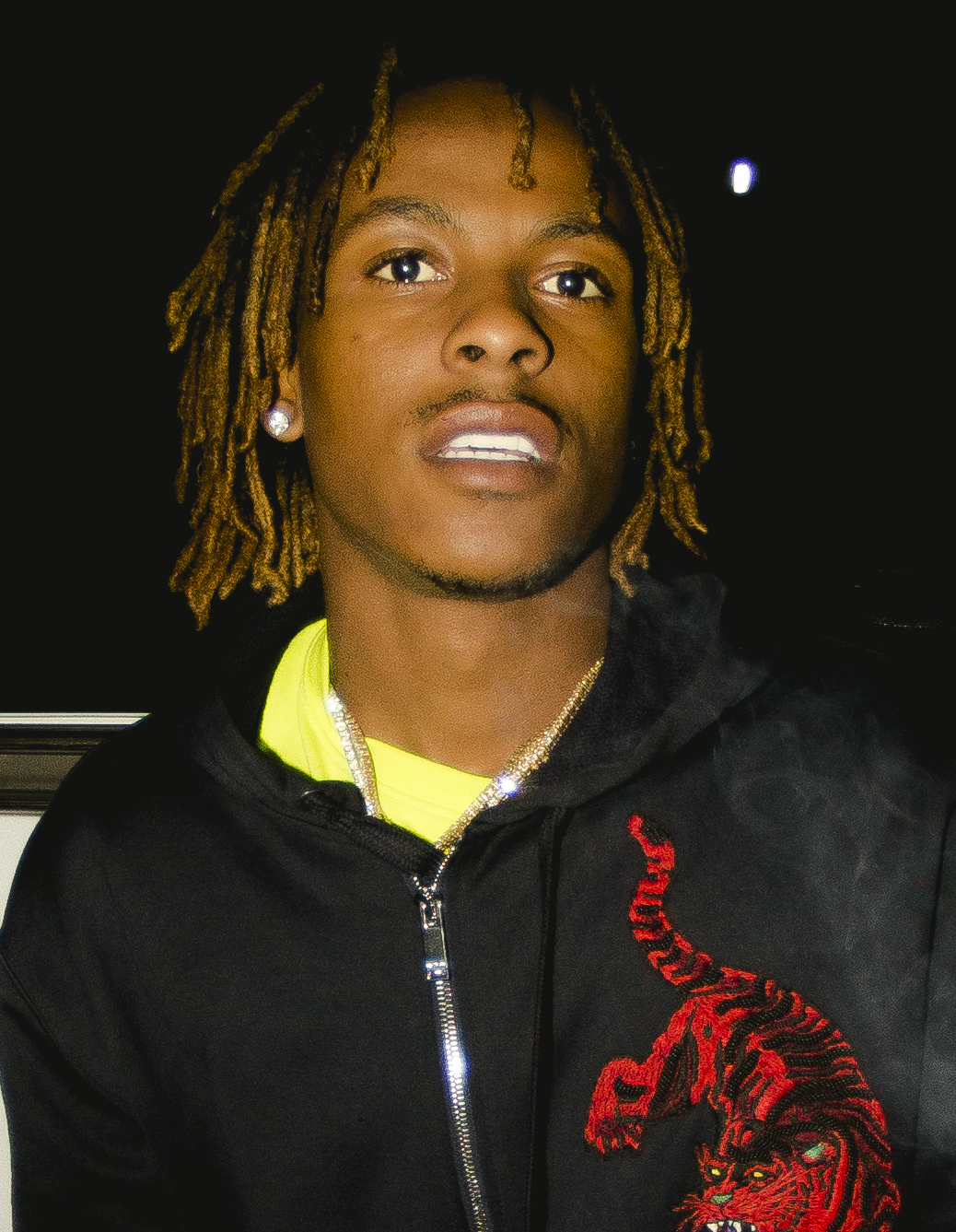
Rich the Kid

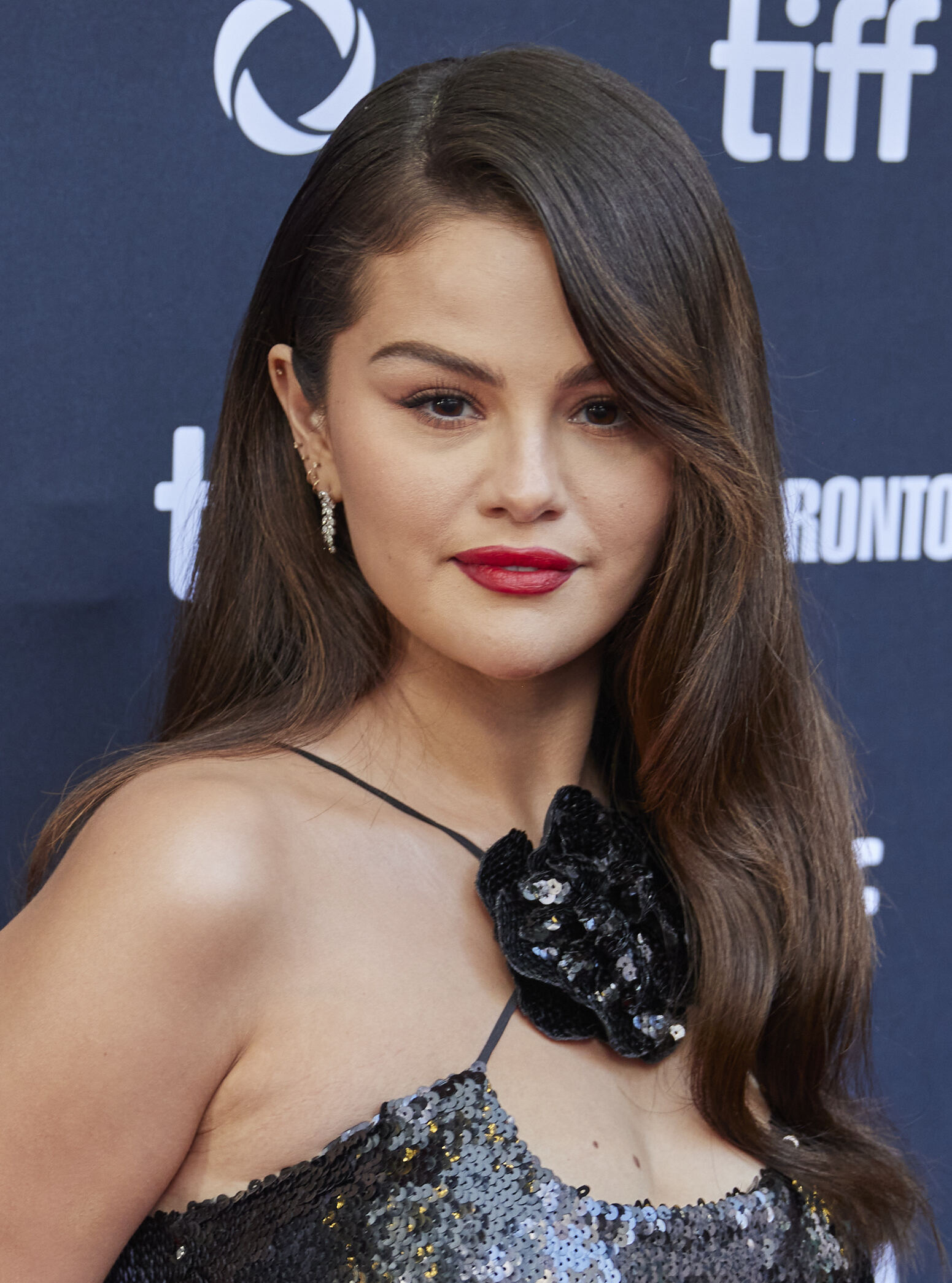
Selena Gomez

- July 1
  - Carlton Anderson, country singer/songwriter
  - Bryan de la Fuente, soccer player
- July 2 – Madison Chock, Olympic ice dancer
- July 3
  - Nathalia Ramos, actress
  - Santiago Segura, actor
- July 4 – Manuel Ávila, boxer
- July 5 – Max Frost, singer/songwriter
- July 6 – Manny Machado, baseball player
- July 8
  - Sky Ferreira, singer, songwriter, model, and actress
  - Xander Mobus, voice actor
- July 9 – Andrew Everett, wrestler
- July 10
  - Kristin Allen, gymnast
  - David Andrews, football player
  - Kelley Mack, actress (d. 2025)
- July 13
  - Akwafei Ajeakwa, soccer player
  - Ahney Her, actress
  - Dylan Patton, actor
  - Rich the Kid, rapper
  - Jacqueline Wiles, Olympic Alpine ski racer
- July 14
  - Bryce Bennett, Olympic Alpine ski racer
  - Koe Wetzel, singer/songwriter
- July 17
  - Nick Bjugstad, hockey player
  - Billie Lourd, actress
- July 18 – Timothy Dolensky, figure skater
- July 20
  - Dres Anderson, football player
  - Paige Hurd, actress
- July 21 – Rachael Flatt, figure skater
- July 22 – Selena Gomez, singer and actress
- July 24 – Mitch Grassi, a cappella singer and member of Pentatonix
- July 25
  - Jillian Clare, actress and singer
  - Lil Phat, rapper (d. 2012)
- July 28
  - Stephone Anthony, football player
  - Spencer Boldman, actor
- July 29
  - Chris Anderson, baseball player
  - David Ash, football player
- July 30
  - Anees, singer/songwriter and rapper
  - Fabiano Caruana, chess player
- July 31
  - José Fernández, Cuban-born baseball player (d.2016)
  - Kyle Larson, stock carracing driver

=== August ===
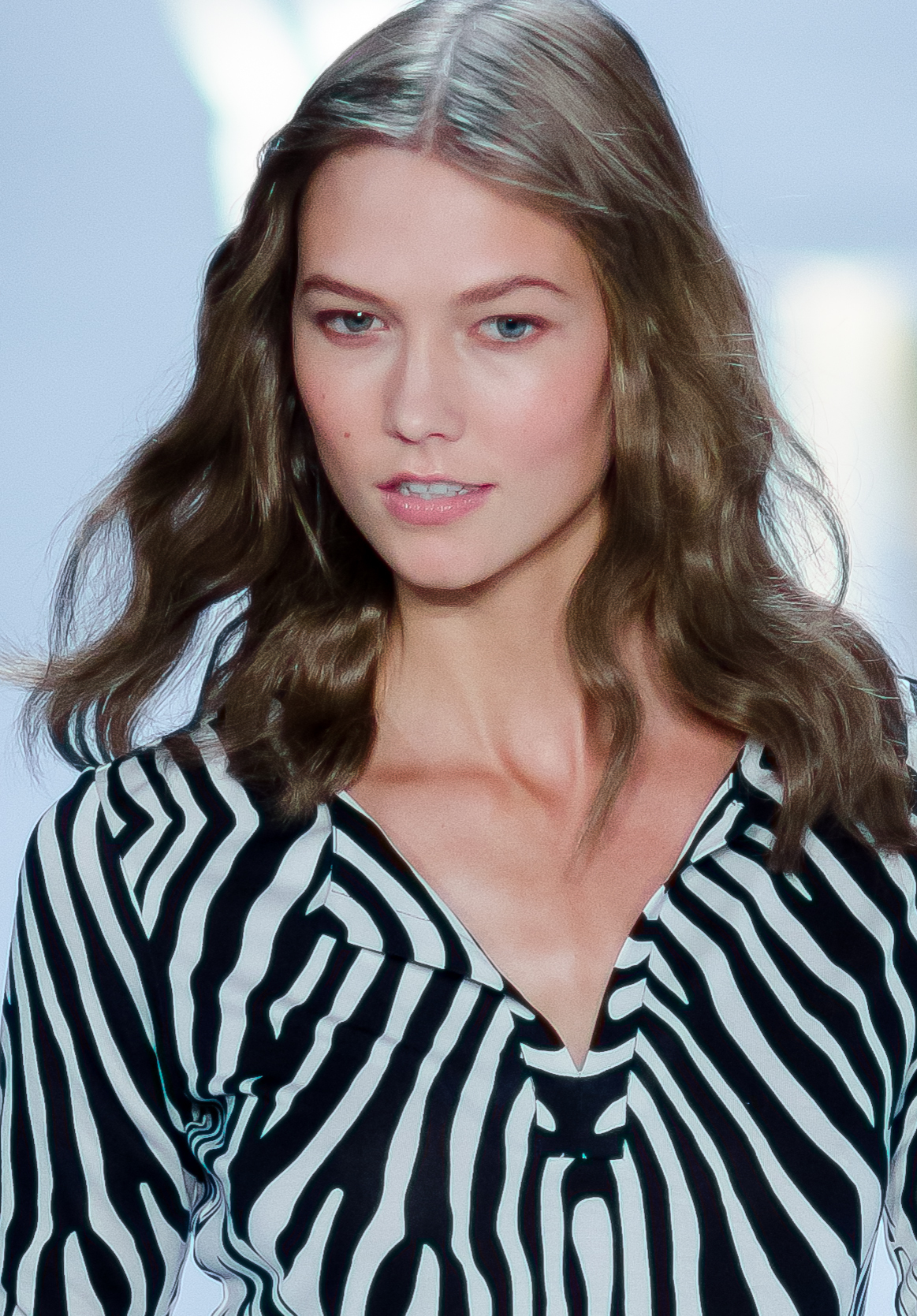
Karlie Kloss

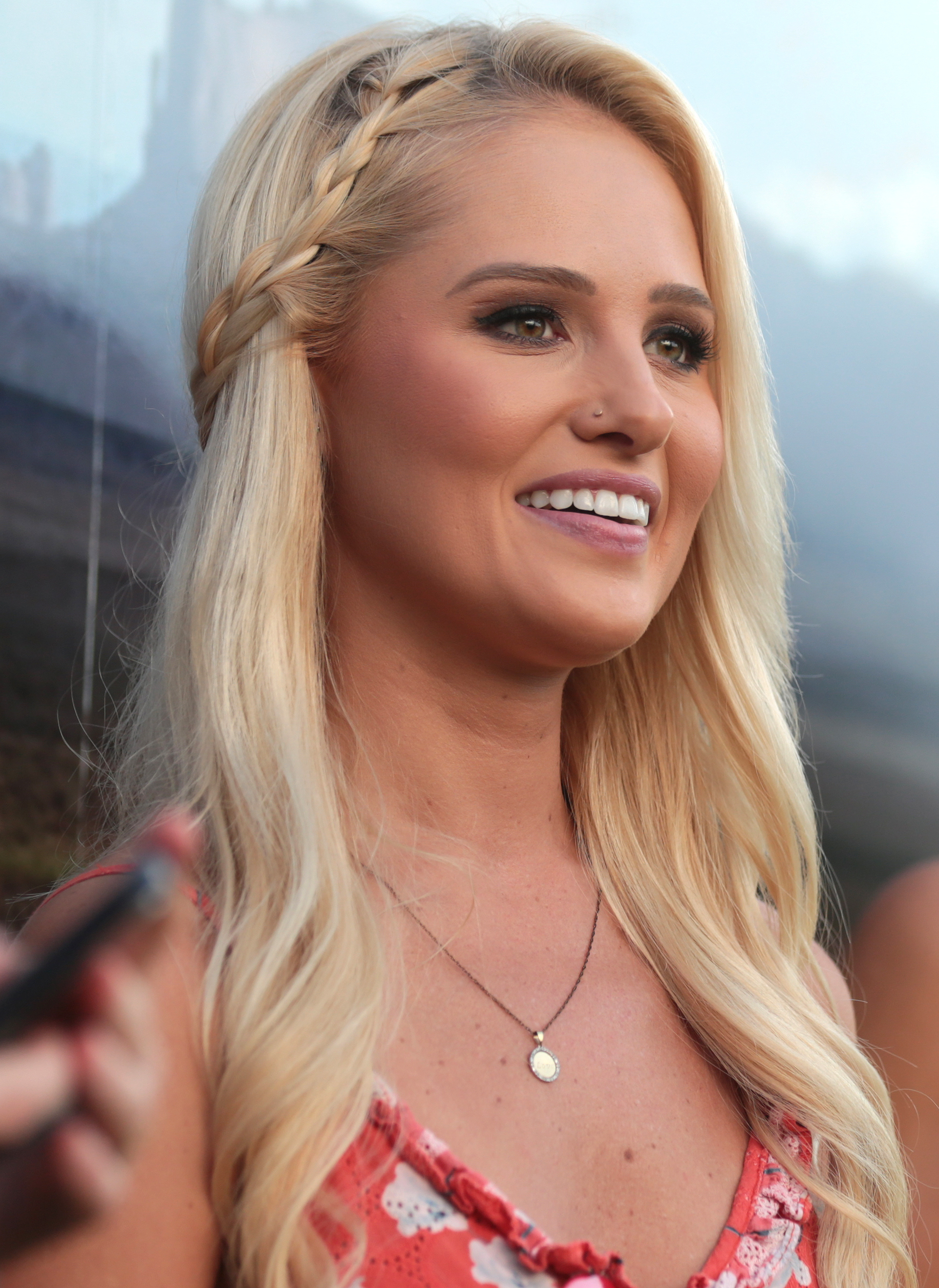
Tomi Lahren

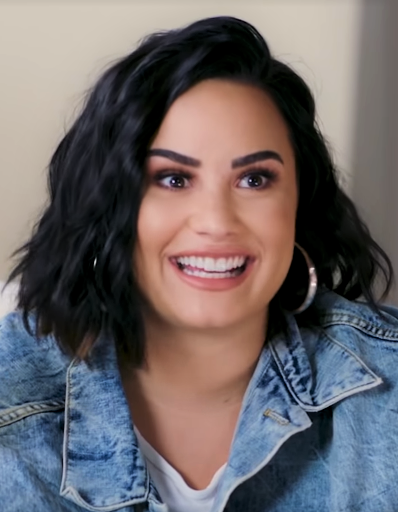
Demi Lovato

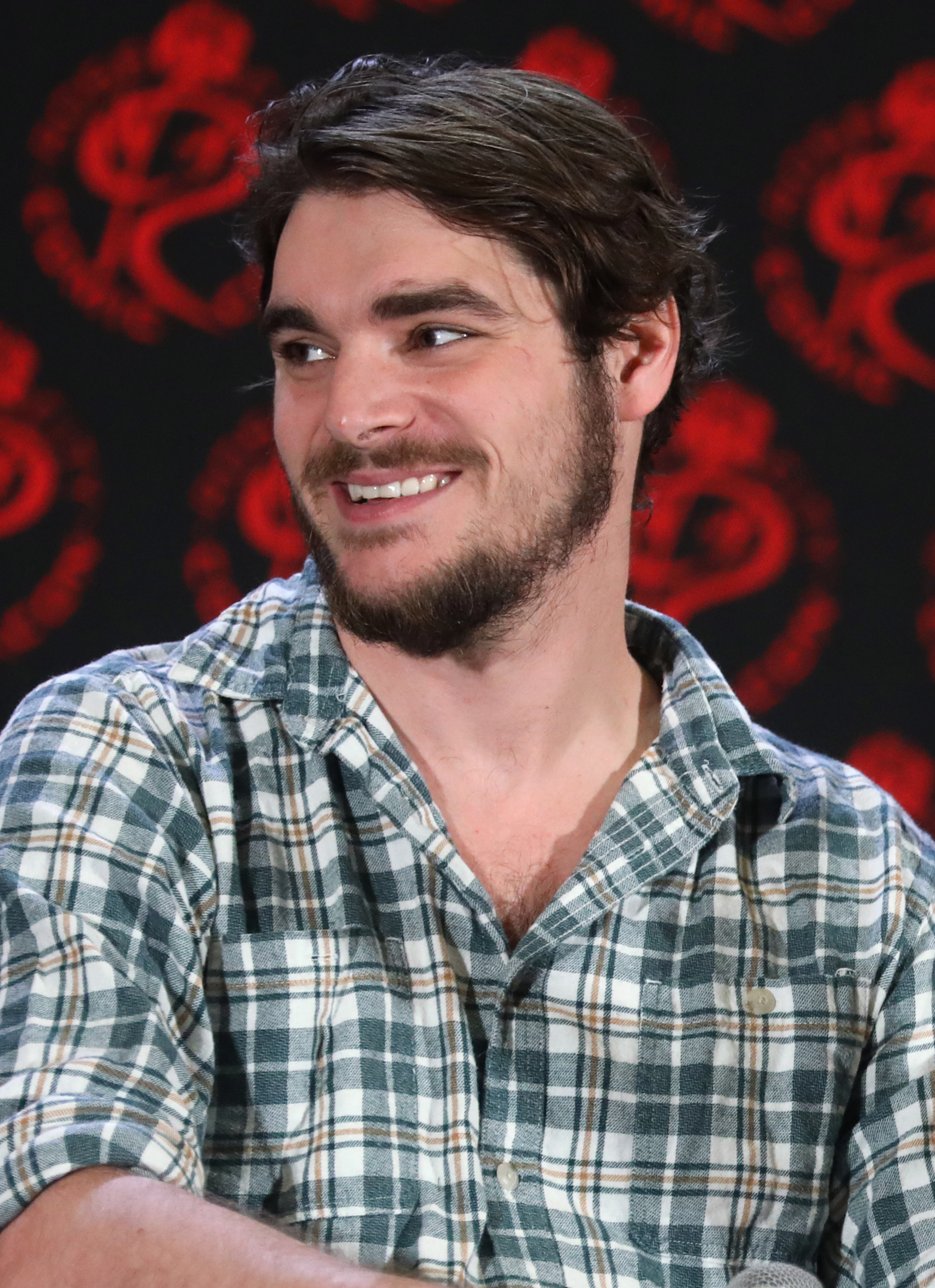
RJ Mitte

- August 2
  - Demi Adejuyigbe, British-born writer, comedian, and internet personality
  - Hallie Eisenberg, actress
  - Malcolm Jones, football player
- August 3 – Karlie Kloss, model and ballerina
- August 4
  - Richard Ash, football player
  - Dylan and Cole Sprouse, twin actors
  - Tiffany Evans, singer and actress
- August 5 – Jack McInerney, soccer player
- August 6 – Jelani Alladin, actor, singer, and dancer
- August 7 – Bobby Lynn Bryant, boxer
- August 8 – Casey Cott, actor
- August 10
  - Rifqa Bary, Sri Lankan-born author and Methodist
  - Michelle Khare, YouTuber, TV host, and actress
- August 11
  - Kody Afusia, football player
  - Stefan Jerome, soccer player
  - Tomi Lahren, television host
- August 16 – Ventura Alvarado, soccer player
- August 17
  - Antonio Andrews, football player
  - Caleb Armstrong, stock car racing driver
- August 18
  - Zaire Anderson, football player
  - Elizabeth Beisel, swimmer
  - Frances Bean Cobain, model and artist, daughter of Kurt Cobain and Courtney Love
- August 20
  - Demi Lovato, singer and actress
  - Alex Newell, actor and singer
- August 21
  - Oliver Bradwell, sprinter
  - Bryce Dejean-Jones, basketball player (d. 2016)
  - RJ Mitte, actor (d. 2026)
- August 22
  - Austin Evans, YouTuber
  - Cheyenne Parker-Tyus, basketball player
  - Ari Stidham, actor and musician
- August 24
  - Spike Albrecht, basketball player
  - Johnny Rapid, gay pornographic film actor
- August 26
  - Jesse Delgado, wrestler
  - Hayley Hasselhoff, actress
- August 27
  - Sarah Attar, American-born Saudi Arabian Olympic middle-distance runner
  - Blake Jenner, actor and singer
- August 28 – Isabelle Abiera, actress and model

=== September ===
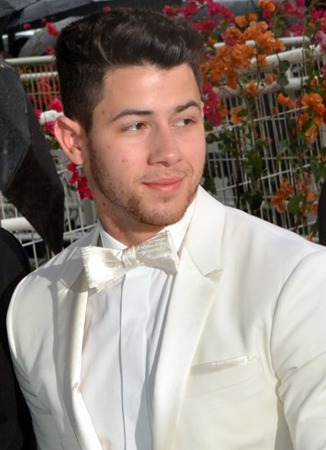
Nick Jonas

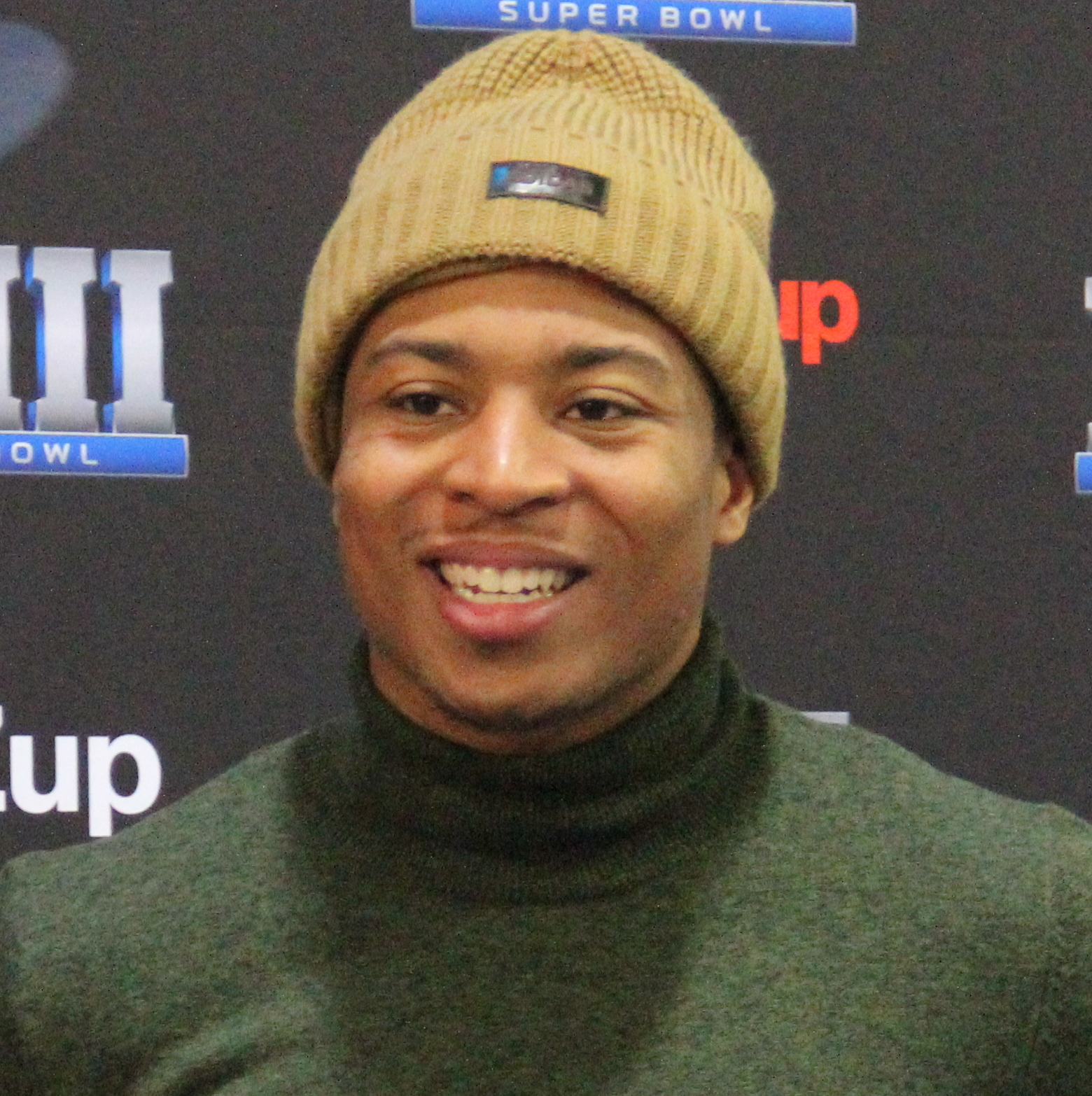
Tyler Lockett

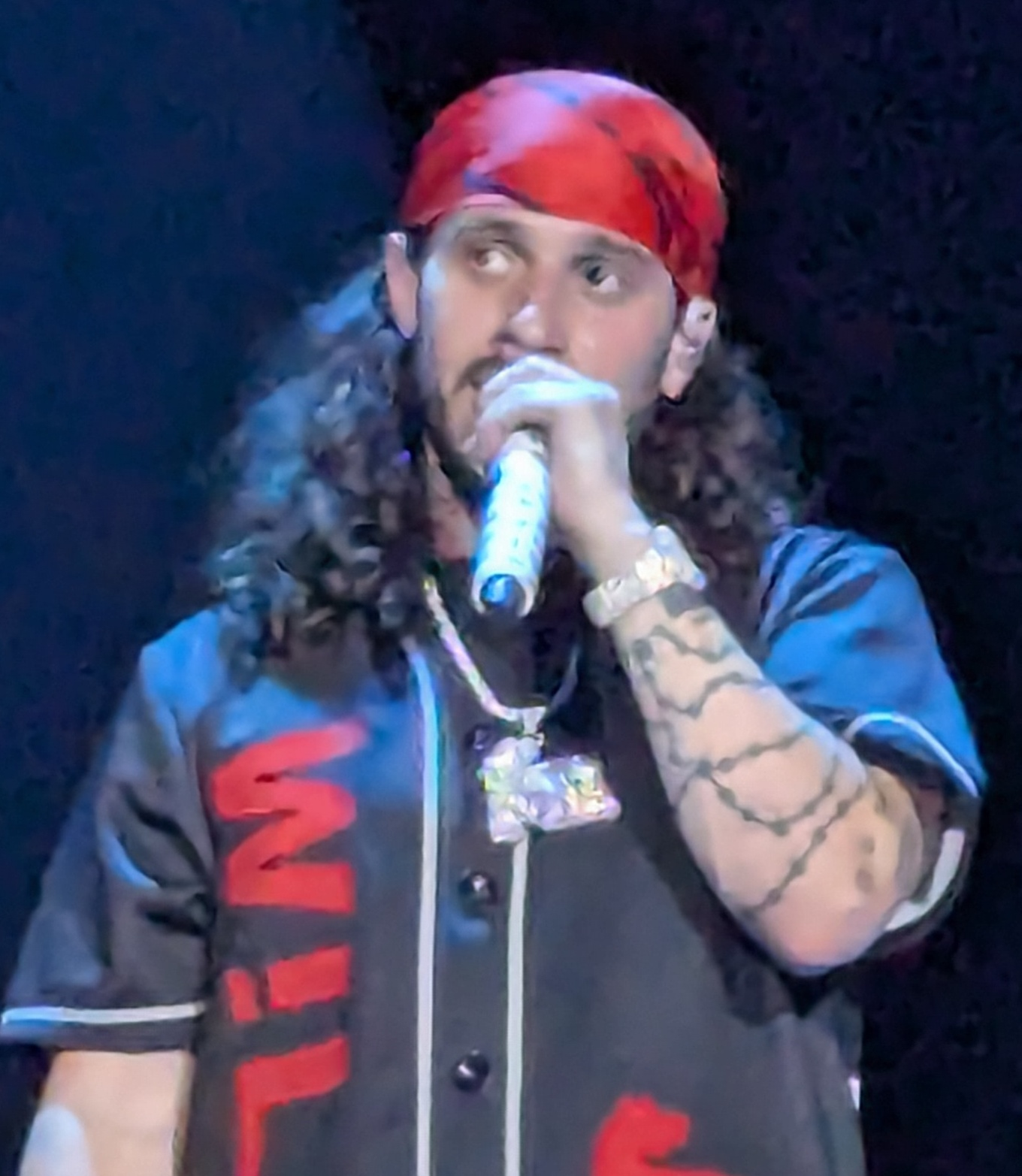
Russ

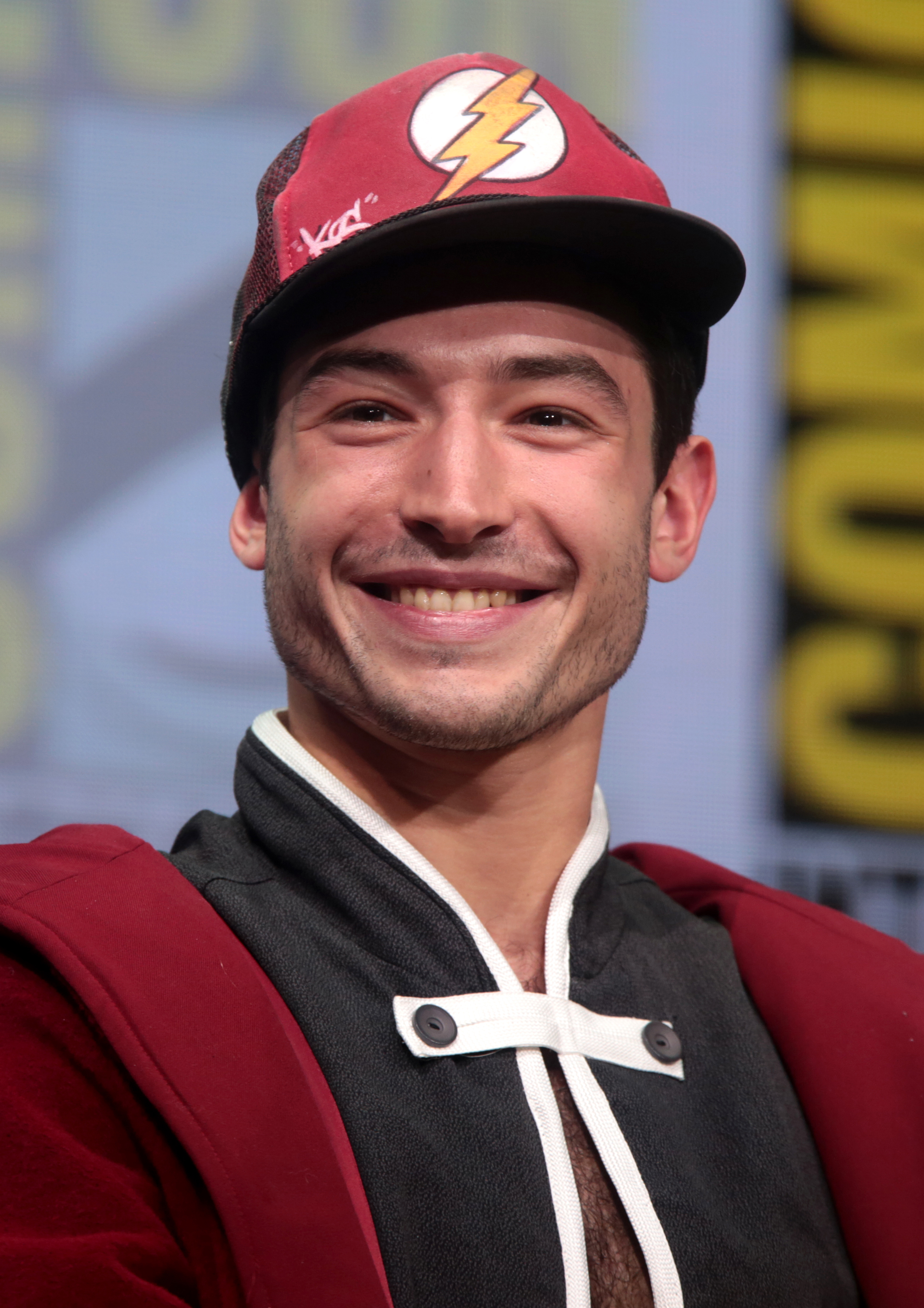
Ezra Miller

- September 2 – Madilyn Bailey, singer
- September 3 – August Alsina, hip-hop/R&B Artist
- September 5 – Brandon Allen, football player
- September 8
  - Dan Altavilla, baseball player
  - Aphromoo, gamer
  - Felisha Cooper, actress
- September 10
  - Evan Austin, Paralympic swimmer
  - Haley Ishimatsu, Olympic diver
- September 11
  - Desireé Bassett, guitarist
  - MacKenzie Bourg, singer
  - JC Caylen, YouTube personality
- September 12 – Connor Franta, YouTuber and entrepreneur
- September 16 – Nick Jonas, singer, songwriter, musician, actor, and member of the Jonas Brothers
- September 17 – Darion Atkins, basketball player
- September 18
  - Au5, electronic musician
  - Amber Liu, singer
- September 19
  - Gavin Fink, actor
  - Erin Jackson, Olympic speed skater
  - Palmer Luckey, entrepreneur
- September 24
  - Jack Allen, football player
  - Ray Drew, football player
  - Jack Sock, tennis player
- September 25 – Keauna McLaughlin, ice skater
- September 26 – Russ, rapper
- September 27
  - Jake Burbage, actor
  - Sam Lerner, actor
  - Max the Meat Guy, chef and YouTuber
- September 28
  - JJ Aldrich, mixed martial artist
  - Justin Anderson, baseball player
  - Skye McCole Bartusiak, actress (d. 2014)
  - Tyler Lockett, football player
  - J. R. Villarreal, actor and producer
- September 30
  - Ezra Miller, actor and singer
  - Trevor Barron, Olympic race walker
  - Bria Hartley, basketball player

=== October ===
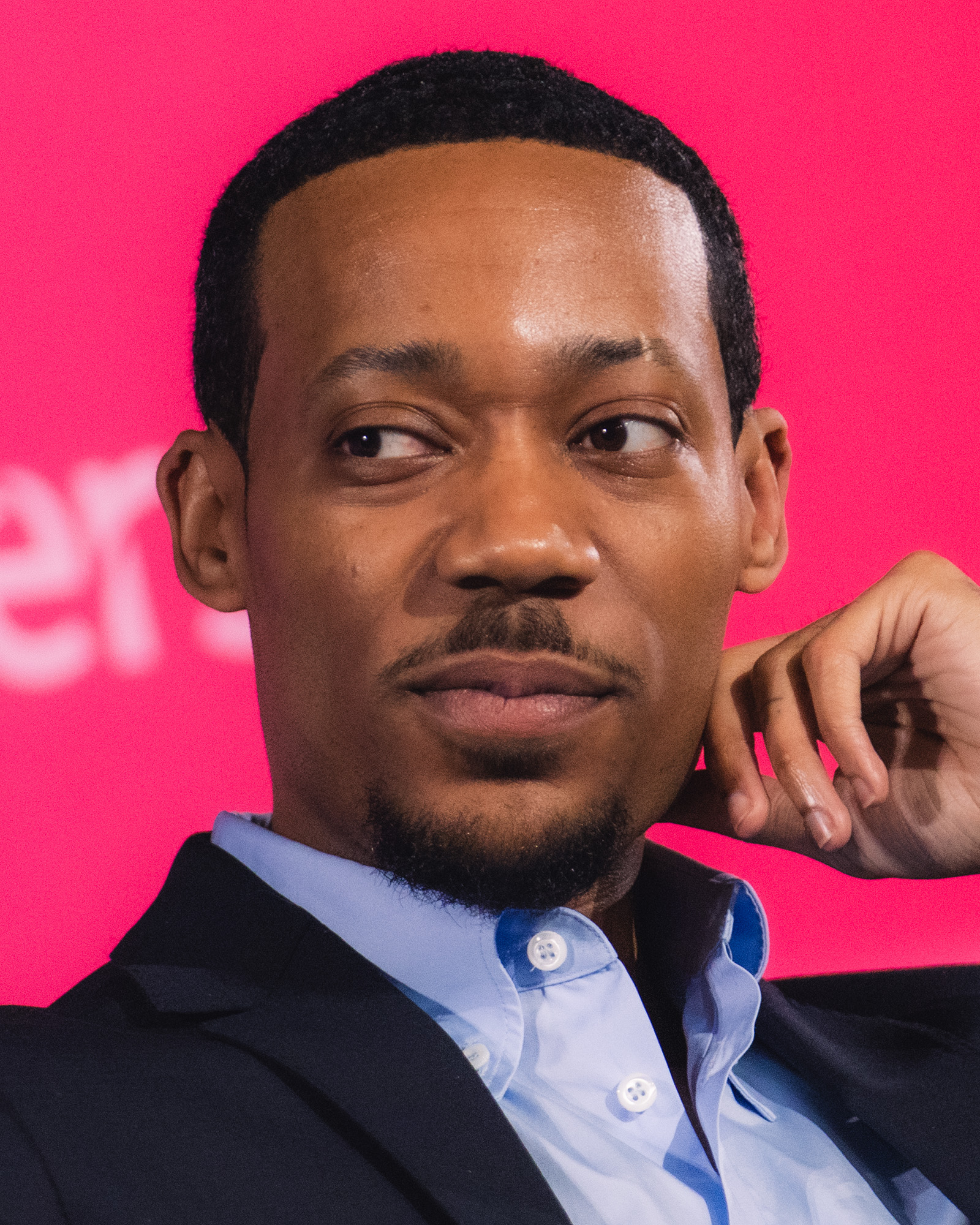
Tyler James Williams

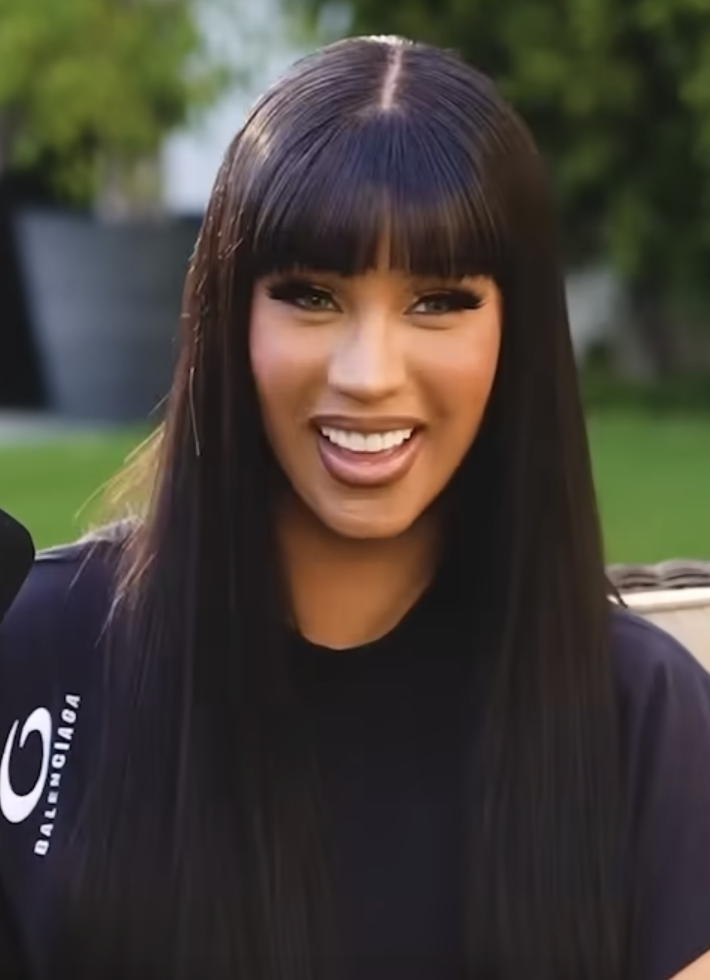
Cardi B

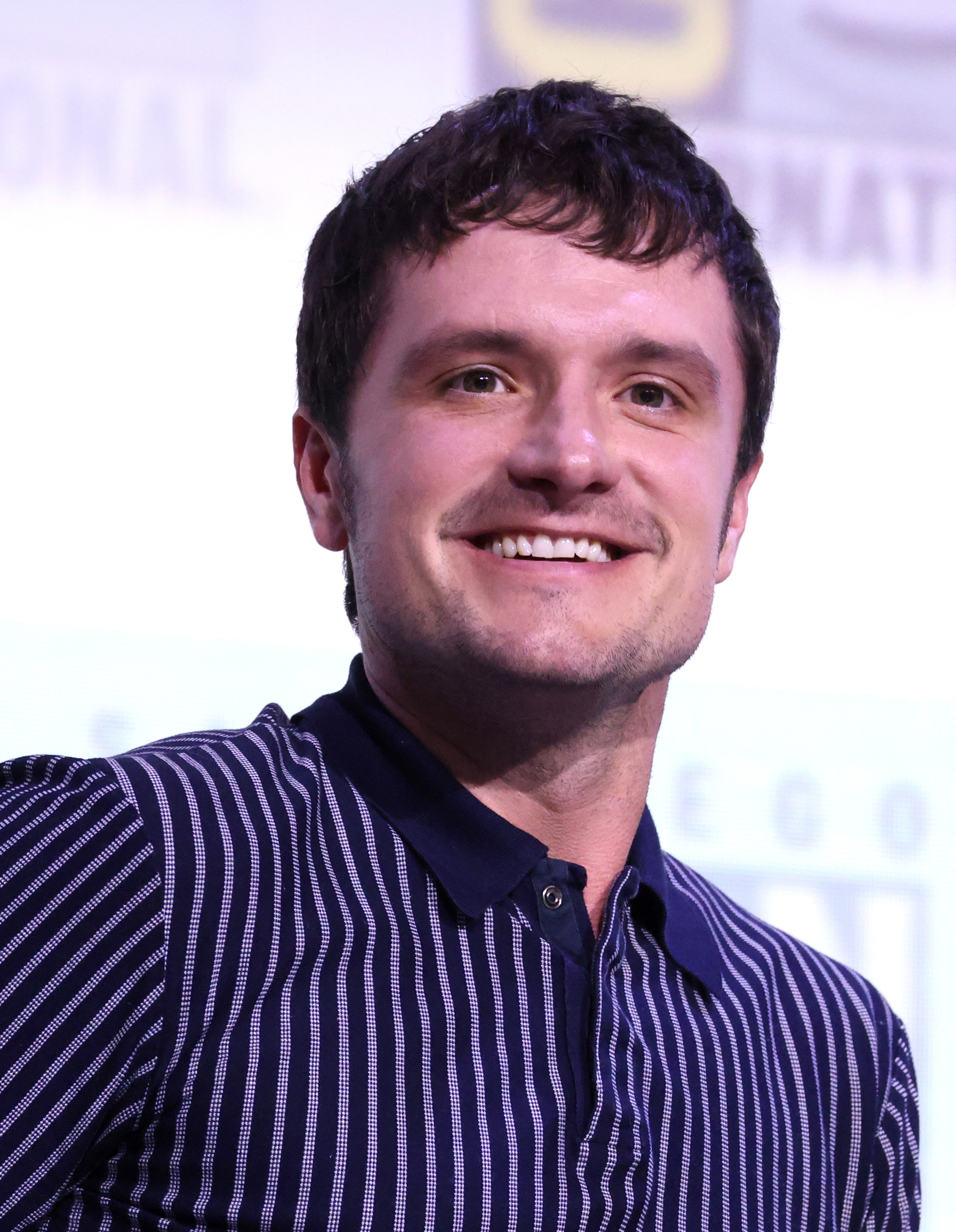
Josh Hutcherson

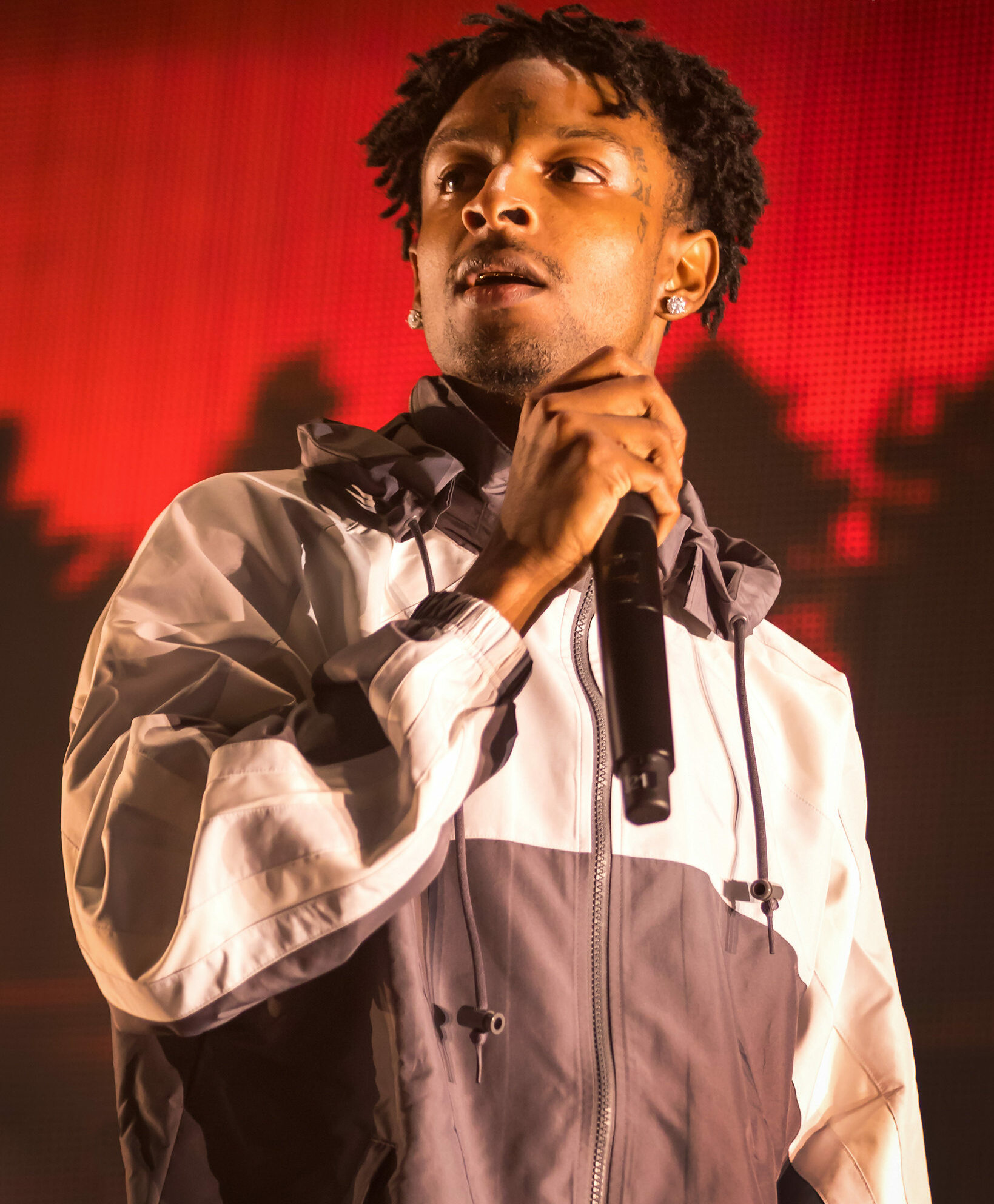
21 Savage

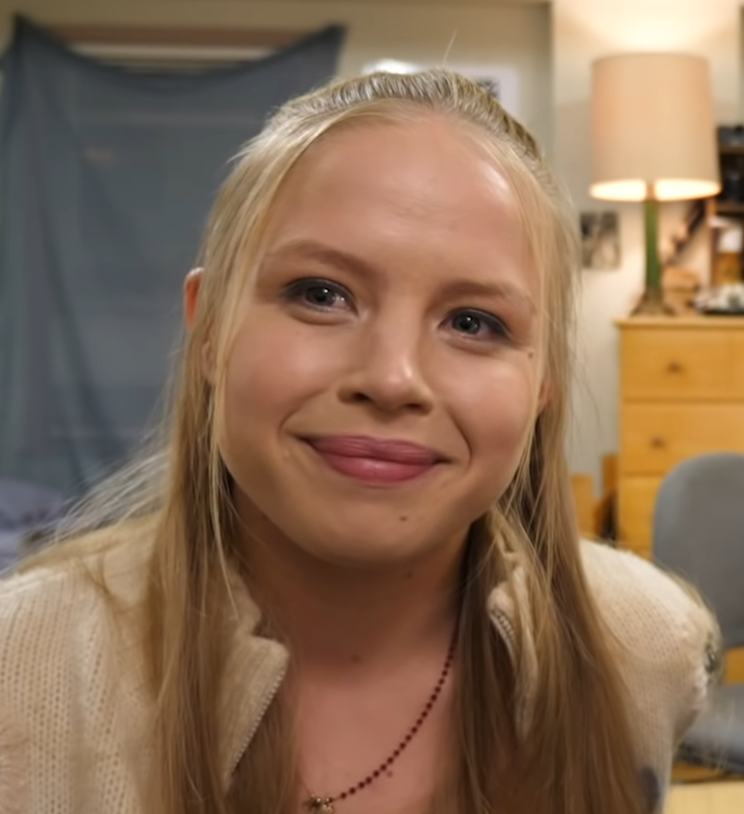
Sofia Vassilieva

- October 2
  - Rory Anderson, football player
  - Kiehl Frazier, football player
- October 5 – David Abidor, soccer player
- October 6
  - Josh Archibald, Canadian-born ice hockey player
  - Rhyon Nicole Brown, actress, singer, and dancer
  - Shelby Rogers, tennis player
- October 7 – Neil Alberico, racing driver
- October 8 – Chelsea Gray, basketball player
- October 9 – Tyler James Williams, actor
- October 11 – Cardi B, rapper
- October 12 – Josh Hutcherson, actor
- October 13
  - Aaron Dismuke, actor
  - Baby K, notable congenital deformity victim (d. 1995)
  - John John Florence, surfer
- October 14 – Savannah Outen, singer
- October 15 – Vincent Martella, actor and singer
- October 16 – Bryce Harper, baseball player
- October 17 – Jacob Artist, actor, dancer, and singer
- October 18 – John John Florence, surfer
- October 19 – Lil Durk, rapper
- October 20 – Kristian Ipsen, Olympic diver
- October 22
  - 21 Savage, British-born rapper
  - Sofia Vassilieva, actress
- October 27
  - Emily Hagins, producer, writer, editor, and director
  - Brandon Saad, ice hockey player
- October 28
  - Andrew Adams, football player
  - Lexi Ainsworth, actress
  - Jermaine Crawford, actor
- October 30 – Tequan Richmond, actor, model, and rapper
- October 31 – Vanessa Marano, actress

=== November ===
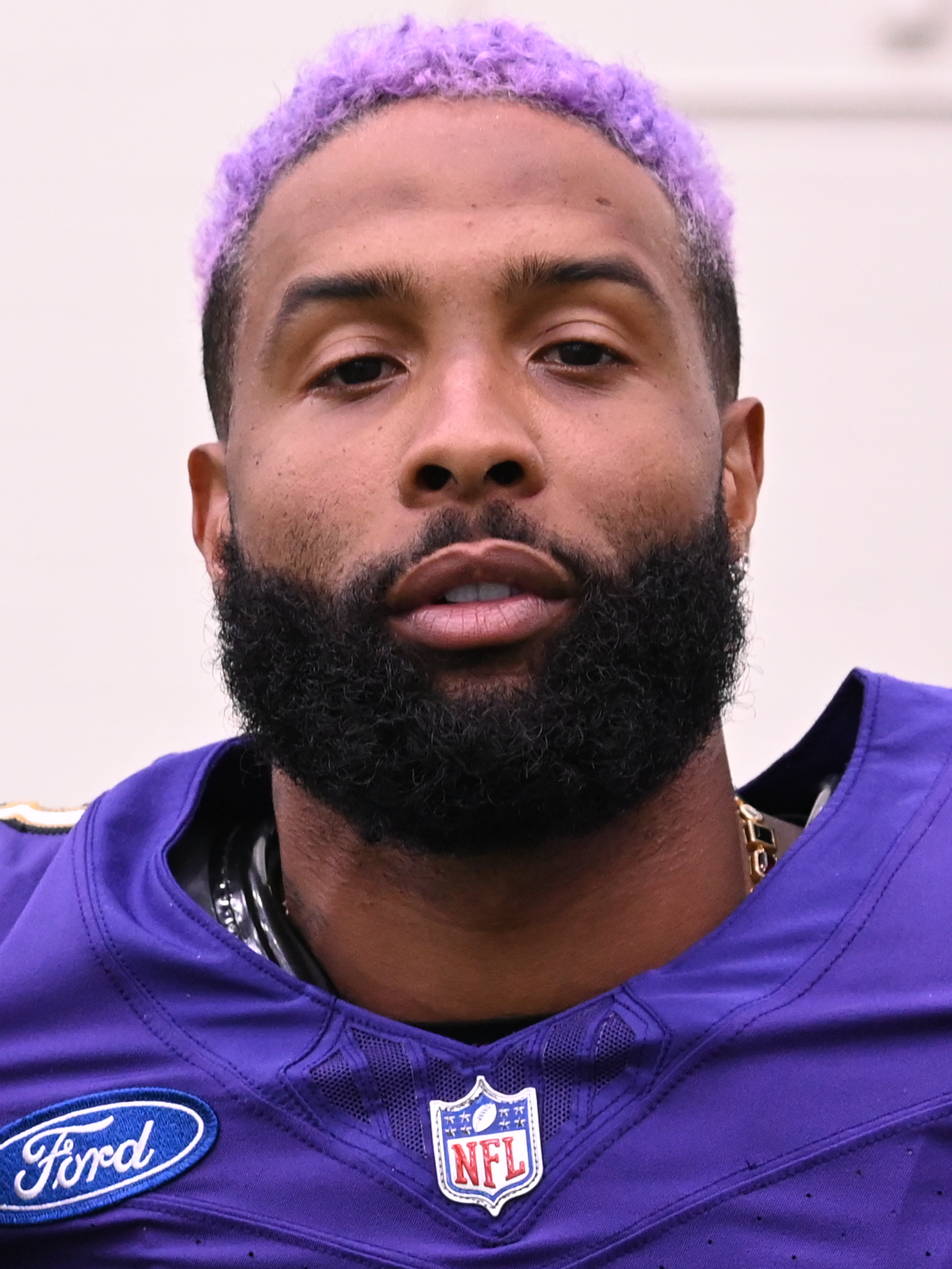
Odell Beckham Jr.

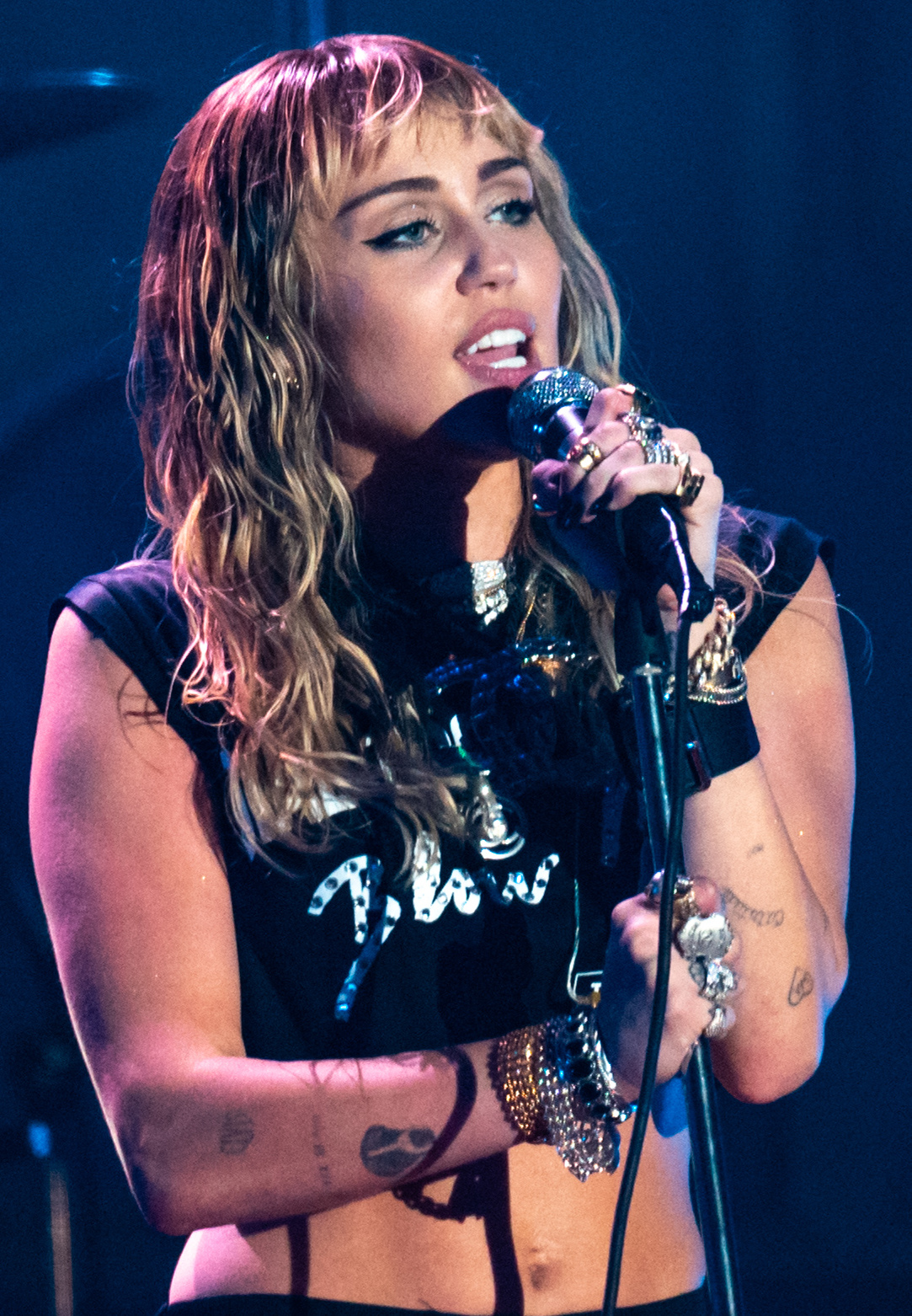
Miley Cyrus

- November 2 – Chelsea Davis, gymnast
- November 5 – Odell Beckham Jr., football player
- November 6 – Megan Meier, suicide victim (d. 2006)
- November 9 – CoryxKenshin, YouTuber
- November 10
  - Teddy Bridgewater, football player
  - Marshall Von Erich, wrestler
- November 11 – Cassandra Bankson, model
- November 12
  - Shelbie Bruce, actress
  - Erika Costell, YouTuber and internet personality
  - Macey Cruthird, actress
- November 15 – Trevor Story, baseball player
- November 16 – Joe Thuney, football player
- November 18 – Nathan Kress, actor
- November 19 – Brandon Frazier, Olympic pair skater
- November 20 – Marc Tyler Arnold, chess player
- November 21
  - Davido, Nigerian-born musician
  - Megan and Liz, fraternal twin recording artists
- November 23
  - Sean Brady, mixed martial artist
  - Miley Cyrus, singer and actress
  - Fuslie, online personality
- November 25 – Zack Shada, actor
- November 27 – Stephanie Anderson, ice hockey player
- November 28
  - Jarvis Landry, football player
  - Jake Miller, rapper and songwriter
- November 29
  - George Atkinson III, football player (d. 2019)
  - David Lambert, actor

=== December ===
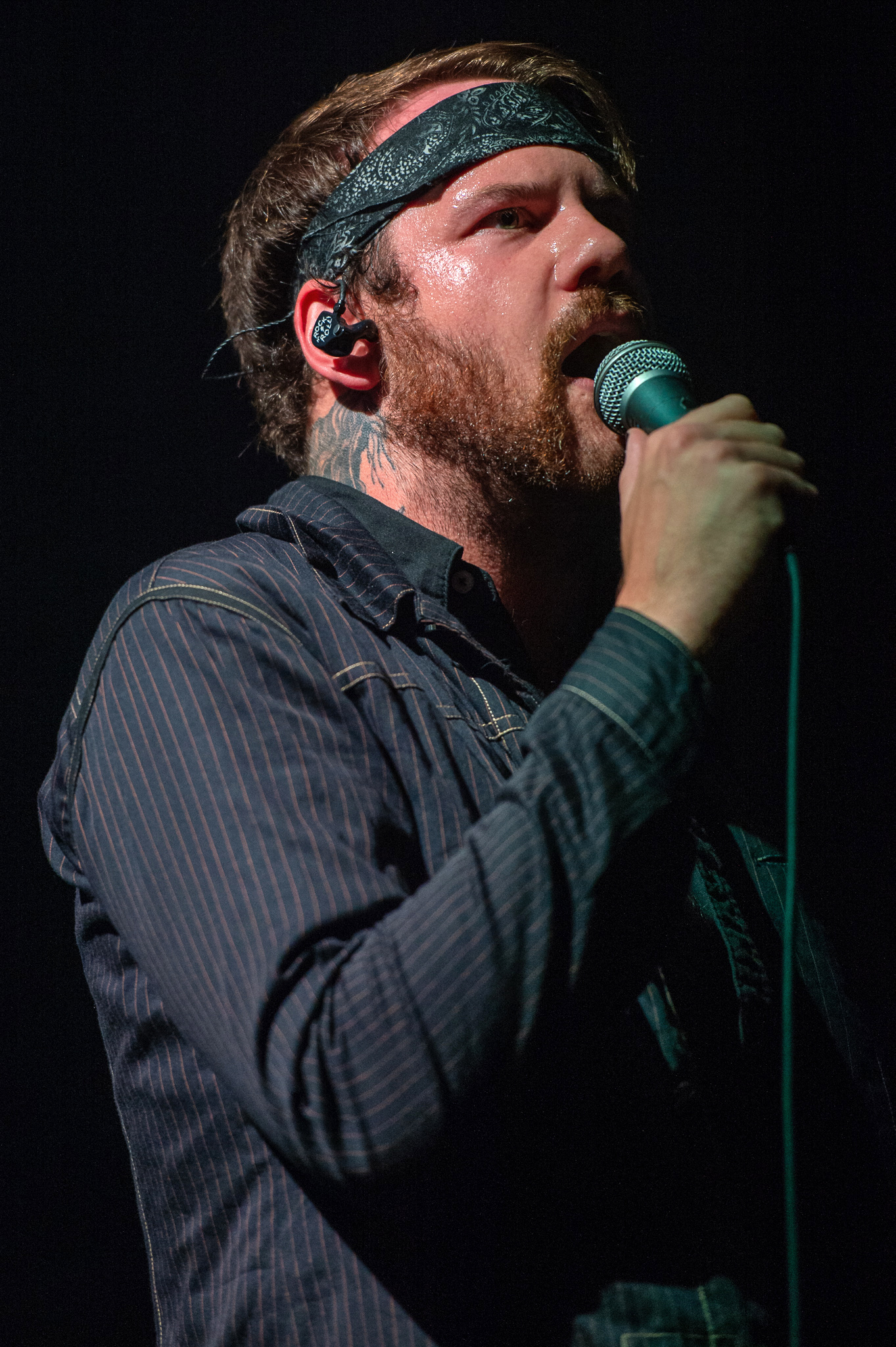
Caleb Shomo

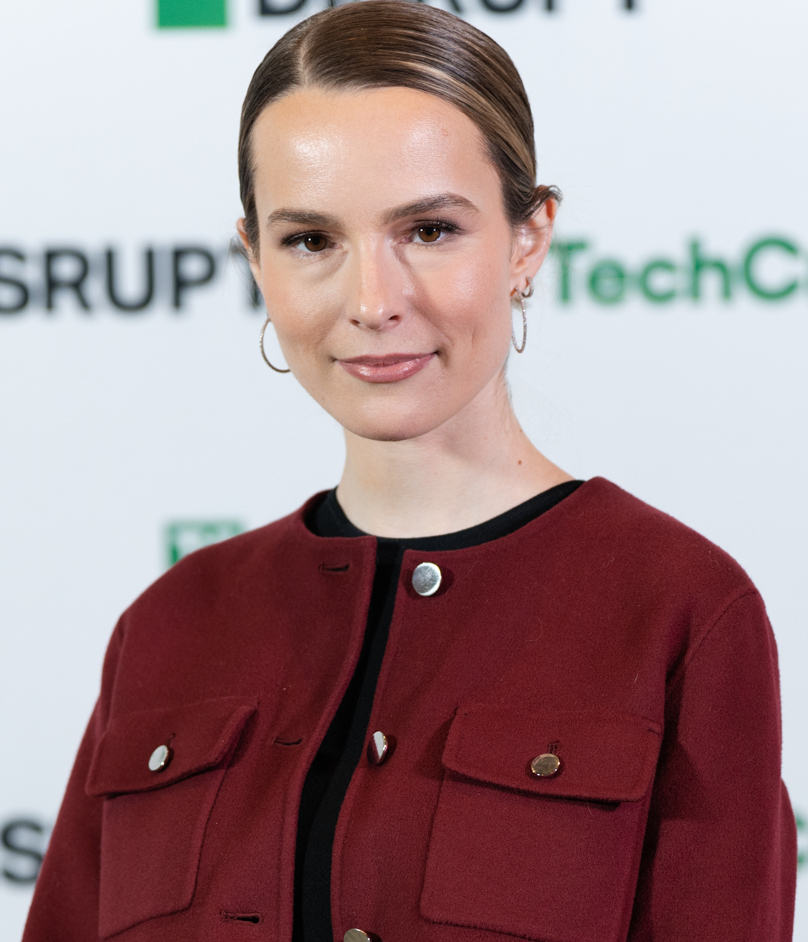
Bridgit Mendler

- December 1
  - Javier Báez, baseball player
  - Caleb Shomo, singer/songwriter and frontman for Beartooth
- December 4 – Ryan Anderson, basketball player
- December 8 – Katie Stevens, singer
- December 7 – Sean Couturier, ice hockey player
- December 11
  - Tiffany Alvord, singer and songwriter
  - Ivana Hong, gymnast
- December 12
  - Shy Glizzy, rapper
  - Austin Jones, singer
- December 13 – Jarett Andretti, racing driver
- December 16 – Jacy Reese Anthis, social scientist
- December 17
  - Berleezy, YouTuber
  - Jordan Garrett, actor
- December 18 – Bridgit Mendler, actress, singer, and musician
- December 21
  - John Atkins, football player
  - Ha Ha Clinton-Dix, football player
- December 23 – Spencer Daniels, actor
- December 24 – Davante Adams, football player
- December 25
  - Thurston Armbrister, football player
  - Rachel Keller, actress
- December 26 – Daniella Karagach, dancer and choreographer
- December 29 – Isaac Asiata, football player
- December 31 – Jerell Adams, football player

=== Full date unknown ===
- Tyler Arnold, record executive
- Ransom Ashley, photographer and actor
- Sebastian James, singer/songwriter

== Deaths ==
- January 1 – Grace Hopper, computer scientist, mathematician, and U.S., Army Navy rear admiral (b, 1906)
- January 7 – Richard Hunt, puppeteer (b. 1951)
- January 23 – Ian Wolfe, actor (b. 1896)
- January 24 – Tina Chow, fashion designer and model (b. 1950)
- January 26 – José Ferrer, Puerto Rican actor and director (b. 1912)
- January 27 – Allan Jones, actor and singer (b. 1907)
- January 29 – Willie Dixon, blues musician (b. 1915)
- February 2 – Bert Parks, actor, singer, and announcer (b. 1914)
- February 3 – Junior Cook, musician (b. 1934)
- February 4 – John Dehner, actor (b. 1915)
- February 7 – Buzz Sawyer, wrestler and trainer (b. 1959)
- February 8 – Bazoline Estelle Usher, African American educator (b. 1885)
- February 9 – Jack Kinney, animator (b. 1909)
- February 10 – Alex Haley, writer (b. 1921)
- February 13 – Dorothy Tree, actress (b. 1906)
- February 14 – Angelique Pettyjohn, actress (b. 1943)
- February 15 – William Schuman, composer (b. 1910)
- February 20 – Dick York, actor (b. 1928)
- February 27 – S. I. Hayakawa, Canadian-born academic and Senator for California (b. 1906)
- February 28 – Josef Alexander, composer (b. 1907)
- March 2 – Sandy Dennis, actress (b. 1937)
- March 4 – Art Babbitt, animator (b. 1907)
- March 6 – Elvia Allman, actress (b. 1904)
- March 8 – Champ Butler, singer (b. 1926)
- March 25 – Nancy Walker, actress and director (b. 1922)
- March 26 – Barbara Frum, American-born Canadian radio and television journalist (b. 1937)
- March 29 – Paul Henreid, Austrian-American actor and filmmaker (b. 1908)
- April 4 – Arthur Russell, cellist and composer (b. 1951)
- April 5
  - Molly Picon, Yiddish-language actress (b. 1898)
  - Sam Walton, businessman, founder of Wal-Mart (b. 1918)
- April 6 – Isaac Asimov, Russian-born science-fiction author (b. 1920)
- April 10 – Sam Kinison, comedian (b. 1953)
- April 14
  - David Miller, film director (b. 1909)
  - Sammy Price, pianist and bandleader (b. 1908)
- April 16 – Neville Brand, actor (b. 1920)
- May 1 – Sharon Redd, singer (b. 1945)
- May 6 – Marlene Dietrich, German-born actress and singer (b. 1901 in Germany)
- May 12
  - Lenny Montana, actor and professional wrestler (b. 1926)
  - Robert Reed, American actor (b. 1932)
- May 13 – Dawon Kahng, Korean-born electrical engineer (b. 1931)
- May 14 – Lyle Alzado, American professional football player (b. 1949)
- May 17 – Lawrence Welk, musician and bandleader (b. 1903)
- May 27 – Uncle Charlie Osborne, Appalachian fiddler (b. 1890)
- May 30 – Antoni Zygmund, Polish-born mathematician (b. 1900)
- June 2 – Philip Dunne, screenwriter and director (b. 1908)
- June 3
  - William Gaines, publisher (b. 1922)
  - Patrick Peyton, priest (b. 1909)
- June 6
  - E. Harold Munn, temperance movement leader and presidential candidate (b. 1903)
  - Larry Riley, actor (b. 1952)
- June 7 – Bill France Sr., race car driver and businessman, co-founder of NASCAR (b. 1909)
- June 18 – Peter Allen, Australian musician (b. 1944)
- June 22
  - M. F. K. Fisher, food writer b. 1908)
  - David Wojnarowicz, artist, writer, filmmaker, and photographer (b. 1954)
- June 26 – Buddy Rogers, professional wrestler (b. 1921)
- June 27 – Allan Jones, actor and singer (b. 1907)
- July 13
  - Celia Cooney, the "Bobbed Hair Bandit" (b. 1904)
  - Alex Wojciechowicz, American football player (b. 1915)
- July 18 – Rudolf Ising, cartoon animator (b. 1903)
- July 26 – Mary Wells, American singer (b. 1943)
- July 27 – Anthony Salerno, mobster (b. 1911)
- July 30
  - Brenda Marshall, actress (b. 1915)
  - Joe Shuster, Canadian-American comic book artist (b. 1914)
- August – Chris McCandless, hiker (b. 1968)
- August 5 – Jeff Porcaro, drummer, songwriter, and record producer (b. 1954)
- August 14 – John Sirica, federal judge (b. 1904)
- August 23 – Charles August Nichols, animator and film director (b. 1910)
- September 1 – Morris Carnovsky, actor (b. 1897)
- September 12
  - Anthony Perkins, actor (b. 1932)
  - Ruth Nelson, actress (b. 1905)
- September 21 – Bill Williams, actor (b. 1915)
- September 29 – Paul Jabara, actor and singer-songwriter (b. 1948)
- October 5
  - Eddie Kendricks, singer (The Temptations) (b. 1939)
  - Rosebud Yellow Robe, Native American folklorist, educator, and author (b. 1907)
- October 16 – Shirley Booth, actress (b. 1898)
- October 22
  - Red Barber, sports announcer and writer (b. 1908)
  - Cleavon Little, actor (b.1939)
- October 25 – Roger Miller, singer-songwriter, musician and actor (b. 1936)
- November 2 – Hal Roach, film and television producer, director and actor (b. 1892)
- November 7 – Jack Kelly, actor (b. 1927)
- November 8
  - Larry Levan, DJ (b. 1954)
  - Ian Stuart Spiro, commodities broker (b. 1946)
- November 10 – Chuck Connors, actor and athlete (b. 1921)
- November 19 – Diane Varsi, actress (b. 1938)
- November 22 – Sterling Holloway, actor (b. 1905)
- November 23 – Roy Acuff, country musician (b. 1903)
- November 24 – Theodore Miller Edison, businessman, inventor, and environmentalist (b. 1898)
- November 29
  - Robert Shayne, actor (b. 1900)
  - Grady Stiles (Lobster Boy), performer (b. 1937)
- November 30 – Peter Blume, American painter and sculptor (b. 1906)
- December 7 – Richard J. Hughes, 45th Governor of New Jersey, and Chief Justice of the New Jersey Supreme Court (b. 1909)
- December 8 – William Shawn, editor of The New Yorker (b. 1907)
- December 9 – Vincent Gardenia, Italian-American actor (b. 1920)
- December 17 – Dana Andrews, actor (b. 1909)
- December 18 – Mark Goodson, television producer (b. 1915)
- December 21 – Stella Adler, actress and teacher (b. 1901)
- December 27 – Stephen Albert, composer (b. 1941)
- December 28 – Sal Maglie, baseball player (b. 1917)
- December 30 – Timothy S. Healy, Jesuit priest and academic administrator (b. 1923)

== See also ==
- 1992 in American television
- List of American films of 1992
- Timeline of United States history (1990–2009)
