= Cinema Eye Honors =

- Current: 20th Cinema Eye Honors
- Awarded for: Non-fiction Films
- Location: New York City
- Country: United States
- First award: 2008
- Website: cinemaeyehonors.com

The Cinema Eye Honors are awards recognizing excellence in nonfiction or documentary filmmaking and include awards for the disciplines of directing, producing, cinematography and editing. The awards are presented each January in New York and have been held since 2011 at the Museum of the Moving Image in Astoria, Queens. Cinema Eye was created to celebrate artistic craft in nonfiction filmmaking, addressing a perceived imbalance in the field where awards were given for social impact or importance of topic rather than artistic excellence.

== History ==
Nominations for the awards are determined by voting of top film festival documentary programmers and winners are voted on by an invited membership of more than 800 documentary film experts. Cinema Eye also presents an Audience Choice Prize where voting is open to the public and the Heterodox Award.

The first Cinema Eye Honors were presented at the IFC Center in New York City on March 18, 2008.

== Winners Through the Years ==
=== Winners in 2008 ===
- Outstanding Achievement in Nonfiction Feature Filmmaking - Manda Bala (Send a Bullet) - Dir. Jason Kohn; Prods. Joey Frank, Jared Goldman, Jason Kohn
- Outstanding Achievement in Direction - Taxi to the Dark Side - Alex Gibney
- Outstanding Achievement in Production - Ghosts of Cité Soleil - Seth Kanegis, Tomas Radoor, Mikael Rieks
- Outstanding Achievement in Cinematography - Manda Bala (Send a Bullet) - Heloísa Passos
- Outstanding Achievement in Editing - Manda Bala (Send a Bullet) - Doug Abel, Jenny Golden, Andy Grieve
- Outstanding Achievement in Graphic Design and Animation - Chicago 10 - Animation by Curious Pictures
- Outstanding Achievement in a Debut Feature Film - Billy the Kid - Jennifer Venditti
- Outstanding Achievement in an International Feature Film - The Monastery: Mr. Vig and the Nun - Dir. Pernille Rose Grønkjær; Prod. Sigrid Dyekjær
- Audience Choice Prize - The King of Kong: A Fistful of Quarters - Dir. Seth Gordon

=== Winners in 2009 ===
- Outstanding Achievement in Nonfiction Feature Filmmaking - Man on Wire - Dir. James Marsh, Prod. Simon Chinn
- Outstanding Achievement in Direction - Waltz with Bashir - Ari Folman
- Outstanding Achievement in Production - Man on Wire - Simon Chinn
- Outstanding Achievement in Cinematography - Encounters at the End of the World - Peter Zeitlinger
- Outstanding Achievement in Editing - Man on Wire - Jinx Godfrey
- Outstanding Achievement in Graphic Design and Animation - Waltz with Bashir - Yoni Goodman, David Polonsky
- Outstanding Achievement in Music Composition - Waltz with Bashir - Max Richter
- Outstanding Achievement in a Debut Feature Film - Up the Yangtze - Dir. Yung Chang
- Outstanding Achievement in an International Feature Film - Waltz with Bashir - Dir. Ari Folman; Prod. Ari Folman, Serge Lalou, Gerhard Meixner, Yael Nahlieli, Roman Paul
- Honored Shorts - Breadmakers, City of Cranes, Kids + money, One Day, The Tailor
- Audience Choice Prize - Up the Yangtze - Dir. Yung Chang

=== Winners in 2010 ===
- Outstanding Achievement in Nonfiction Feature Filmmaking - The Cove - Dir. Louie Psihoyos; Prod. Paula DuPré Pesman, Fisher Stevens
- Outstanding Achievement in Direction - The Beaches of Agnès - Agnès Varda
- Outstanding Achievement in Production - The Cove - Paula DuPré Pesman, Fisher Stevens
- Outstanding Achievement in Cinematography - The Cove - Brook Aitken
- Outstanding Achievement in Editing - Burma VJ - Janus Billeskov-Jansen, Thomas Papapetros
- Outstanding Achievement in Graphic Design and Animation
  - Food, Inc. - Bigstar
  - RiP!: A Remix Manifesto - Francis Hanneman, Darren Pasemko, Kent Hugo, Omar Majeed, Brett Gaylor, Open Source Cinema
- Outstanding Achievement in Original Music Score - October Country - Danny Grody, Donal Mosher, Michael Palmieri, Ted Savarese, Kenric Taylor
- Outstanding Achievement in a Debut Feature Film - October Country - Dir. Michael Palmieri, Donal Mosher
- Outstanding Achievement in an International Feature Film - Burma VJ - Dir. Anders Østergaard; Prod. Lise Lense-Møller
- Spotlight Award - Beetle Queen Conquers Tokyo - Dir. Jessica Oreck
- Audience Choice Prize - The September Issue - Dir. R. J. Cutler
- 2010 Cinema Eye Honors Legacy Award - Sherman's March - Dir. Ross McElwee

=== Winners in 2011 ===
- Outstanding Achievement in Nonfiction Feature Filmmaking - Exit Through the Gift Shop - Dir. Banksy; Prod. Jaimie D’Cruz
- Outstanding Achievement in Direction - The Oath - Laura Poitras
- Outstanding Achievement in Production - Last Train Home - Mila Aung-Thwin, Daniel Cross
- Outstanding Achievement in Cinematography - Last Train Home - Lixin Fan
- Outstanding Achievement in Editing - Exit Through the Gift Shop - Chris King, Tom Fulford
- Outstanding Achievement in Graphic Design and Animation - Gasland - Juan Cardarelli, Alex Tyson
- Outstanding Achievement in Original Music Score - The Sound of Insects: Record of a Mummy - Norbert Möslang
- Outstanding Achievement in a Debut Feature Film - Marwencol - Dir. Jeff Malmberg
- Outstanding Achievement in an International Feature Film - Last Train Home - Dir. Lixin Fan; Prod. Mila Aung-Thwin, Daniel Cross
- Spotlight Award - The Autobiography of Nicolae Ceauşescu - Dir. Andrei Ujică
- Audience Choice Prize - Joan Rivers: A Piece of Work - Dir. Ricki Stern, Annie Sundberg
- Heterodox Award - Putty Hill - Dir. Matt Porterfield
- Outstanding Achievement in Nonfiction Short Filmmaking - The Poodle Trainer - Dir. Vance Malone
- 2011 Legacy Award - Grey Gardens - Albert Maysles, David Maysles, Ellen Hovde, Muffie Meyer and Susan Froemke

=== Winners in 2012 ===
- Outstanding Achievement in Nonfiction Feature Filmmaking - The Interrupters - Dir. Steve James; Prod. Steve James and Alex Kotlowitz
- Outstanding Achievement in Direction - The Interrupters - Steve James
- Outstanding Achievement in Production - Pina - Gian-Piero Ringel, Wim Wenders
- Outstanding Achievement in Cinematography - Hell and Back Again - Danfung Dennis
- Outstanding Achievement in Editing - Senna - Gregers Sall, Chris King
- Outstanding Achievement in Graphic Design and Animation - Tabloid - Rob Feng, Jeremy Landman
- Outstanding Achievement in Original Music Score - Tabloid - John Kusiak
- Outstanding Achievement in a Debut Feature Film - The Arbor - Dir. Clio Barnard
- Spotlight Award - El Lugar Más Pequeño (The Tiniest Place) - Dir. Tatiana Huezo Sanchez
- Audience Choice Prize - Buck - Dir. Cindy Meehl
- Heterodox Award - Beginners - Dir. Mike Mills
- Outstanding Achievement in Nonfiction Short Filmmaking - Diary - Tim Hetherington
- Hell Yeah Prize - Paradise Lost Trilogy - Dir. Joe Berlinger, Bruce Sinofsky
- 2012 Legacy Award - Titicut Follies - Frederick Wiseman

=== Winners in 2013 ===
- Outstanding Achievement in Nonfiction Feature Filmmaking - 5 Broken Cameras - Dir. Emad Burnat and Guy Davidi; Prod. Christine Camdessus, Serge Gordey, Emad Burnat and Guy Davidi
- Outstanding Achievement in Direction - Detropia - Heidi Ewing and Rachel Grady
- Outstanding Achievement in Production - The Imposter - Dimitri Doganis
- Outstanding Achievement in Cinematography - Chasing Ice - Jeff Orlowski
- Outstanding Achievement in Editing - How to Survive a Plague - T. Woody Richman and Tyler H. Walk
- Outstanding Achievement in Graphic Design and Animation - Searching for Sugar Man - Oskar Gullstrand and Arvid Steen
- Outstanding Achievement in Original Music Score - Detropia - Dial.81
- Outstanding Achievement in a Debut Feature Film - Only The Young - Jason Tippet and Elizabeth Mims
- Spotlight Award - Argentinian Lesson - Wojciech Staroń
- Audience Choice Prize - Bully - Lee Hirsch
- Heterodox Award - Museum Hours - Jem Cohen
- Outstanding Achievement in Nonfiction Short Filmmaking - Good Bye Mandima (Kwa Heri Mandima) - Robert-Jan Lacombe
- 2013 Legacy Award - The War Room - Chris Hegedus and D.A. Pennebaker

=== Winners in 2014 ===
- Outstanding Achievement in Nonfiction Feature Filmmaking - The Act of Killing - Dir. Joshua Oppenheimer; Prod. Signe Byrge Sørensen
- Outstanding Achievement in Direction - Stories We Tell - Sarah Polley
- Outstanding Achievement in Production - The Act of Killing - Signe Byrge Sørensen
- Outstanding Achievement in Cinematography - Leviathan - Lucien Castaing-Taylor and Véréna Paravel
- Outstanding Achievement in Editing - Let the Fire Burn - Nels Bangerter
- Outstanding Achievement in Graphic Design and Animation - Cutie and the Boxer - Noriko Shinohara and Art Jail
- Outstanding Achievement in Original Music Score - Cutie and the Boxer - Yasuaki Shimizu
- Outstanding Achievement in a Debut Feature Film - Cutie and the Boxer - Zachary Heinzerling
- Spotlight Award - "The Last Station" - Cristian Soto and Catalina Vergara
- Audience Choice Prize - Sound City - Dave Grohl
- Heterodox Award - "Post Tenebras Lux" - Carlos Reygadas
- Outstanding Achievement in Nonfiction Short Filmmaking - A Story for Modlins - Sergio Oksman
- Outstanding Achievement in Nonfiction Films Made for Television - The Crash Reel - Dir. Lucy Walker; Prod. Julian Cautherley and Lucy Walker
- 2014 Legacy Award - Harlan County, USA - Barbara Kopple
- Hell Yeah Prize - Gasland - Josh Fox

=== Winners in 2015 ===
- Outstanding Achievement in Nonfiction Feature Filmmaking - Citizenfour - Dir. Laura Poitras; Prod. Laura Poitras, Mathilde Bonnefoy and Dirk Wilutzky
- Outstanding Achievement in Direction - Citizenfour - Laura Poitras
- Outstanding Achievement in Production - Citizenfour - Laura Poitras, Mathilde Bonnefoy and Dirk Wilutzky
- Outstanding Achievement in Cinematography
  - 20,000 Days on Earth - Erik Wilson
  - Virunga - Franklin Dow and Orlando von Einsiedel
- Outstanding Achievement in Editing - Citizenfour - Mathilde Bonnefoy
- Outstanding Achievement in Graphic Design and Animation - Jodorowsky's Dune - Syd Garon and Particle Fever - MK12
- Outstanding Achievement in Original Music Score - 20,000 Days on Earth - Nick Cave and Warren Ellis
- Outstanding Achievement in a Debut Feature Film - Finding Vivian Maier - John Maloof and Charlie Siskel
- Spotlight Award - 1971 - Johanna Hamilton
- Heterodox Award - Boyhood - Richard Linklater
- Audience Choice - Keep On Keepin' On - Alan Hicks
- Outstanding Achievement in Nonfiction Short Filmmaking - The Lion's Mouth Opens - Lucy Walker
- Outstanding Achievement in Nonfiction Films Made for Television - The Price of Gold - Dir. Nanette Burstein; Prod. Libby Geist
- 2015 Legacy Award - Paris is Burning - Jennie Livingston

=== Winners in 2016 ===
- Outstanding Achievement in Nonfiction Feature Filmmaking - The Look of Silence - Dir. Joshua Oppenheimer; Prod. Signe Byrge Sørensen
- Outstanding Achievement in Direction - The Look of Silence - Joshua Oppenheimer
- Outstanding Achievement in Production - The Look of Silence - Signe Byrge Sørensen
- Outstanding Achievement in Cinematography
  - Cartel Land - Matthew Heineman and Matt Porwoll
  - Meru - Jimmy Chin and Renan Ozturk
- Outstanding Achievement in Editing - Amy - Chris King
- Outstanding Achievement in Graphic Design and Animation - Kurt Cobain: Montage of Heck - Stefan Nadelman and Hisko Hulsing
- Outstanding Achievement in Original Music Score - The Heart of a Dog - Laurie Anderson
- Outstanding Achievement in a Debut Feature Film - The Wolfpack - Crystal Moselle
- Spotlight Award - Toto and His Sisters - Alexandre Nanău
- Heterodox Award - Taxi - Jafar Panahi
- Audience Choice - Meru - Jimmy Chin and Chai Vasarhelyi
- Outstanding Achievement in Nonfiction Short Filmmaking
  - Buffalo Juggalos - Scott Cummings
  - Hotel 22 - Elizabeth Lo
- Outstanding Achievement in Nonfiction Films Made for Television - Private Violence - Dir. Cynthia Hill; Prod. Cynthia Hill
- 2016 Legacy Award - American Movie - Chris Smith

=== Winners in 2017 ===
- Outstanding Achievement in Nonfiction Feature Filmmaking - Cameraperson - Dir. Kirsten Johnson; Prod. Kirsten Johnson and Marilyn Ness
- Outstanding Achievement in Direction - OJ: Made in America - Ezra Edelman
- Outstanding Achievement in Production - OJ: Made in America - Ezra Edelman and Caroline Waterlow
- Outstanding Achievement in Cinematography - Cameraperson - Kirsten Johnson
- Outstanding Achievement in Editing - Cameraperson - Nels Bangerter
- Outstanding Achievement in Graphic Design and Animation - Tower - Craig Staggs and Keith Maitland
- Outstanding Achievement in Original Music Score - Contemporary Colors - David Byrne, LeeAnn Rossi and Aaron Rosenblum
- Outstanding Achievement in a Debut Feature Film - Hooligan Sparrow - Nanfu Wang
- Spotlight Award - Les Sauteurs (Those Who Jump) - Estephan Wagner and Moritz Siebert
- Heterodox Award - All These Sleepless Nights - Michal Marczak
- Audience Choice - Gleason - Clay Tweel
- Outstanding Achievement in Nonfiction Short Filmmaking - La Laguna - Aaron Schock
- Outstanding Achievement in Nonfiction Films Made for Television - Making a Murderer - Dir. Laura Ricciardi and Moira Demos; Prod. Laura Ricciardi and Moira Demos
- 2017 Legacy Award - The Times of Harvey Milk - Rob Epstein

=== Winners in 2018 ===
- Outstanding Achievement in Nonfiction Feature Filmmaking - Strong Island - Dir. Yance Ford; Prod. Joslyn Barnes and Yance Ford
- Outstanding Achievement in Direction - Strong Island - Yance Ford
- Outstanding Achievement in Production - Last Men in Aleppo - Kareem Abeed, Stefan Kloos, and Søren Steen Jespersen
- Outstanding Achievement in Cinematography - Chasing Coral - Andrew Ackerman and Jeff Orlowski
- Outstanding Achievement in Editing - Quest - Lindsay Utz
- Outstanding Achievement in Graphic Design and Animation - Long Strange Trip - Stefan Nadelman
- Outstanding Achievement in Original Music Score - Jane - Philip Glass
- Outstanding Achievement in a Debut Feature Film - Strong Island- Yance Ford
- Outstanding Achievement in Broadcast Nonfiction Filmmaking - The Keepers - Dir. Ryan White; Prod. Jessica Hargrave
- Spotlight Award - Lots of Kids, a Monkey and a Castle - Gustavo Salmerón
- Heterodox Award - The Florida Project - Sean Baker
- Audience Choice - Jane - Brett Morgen
- Outstanding Achievement in Nonfiction Short Filmmaking - The Rabbit Hunt - Patrick Bresnan
- 2018 Legacy Award - When We Were Kings - Leon Gast
- Hell Yeah Prize - Icarus - Bryan Fogel

=== Winners in 2019 ===
- Outstanding Achievement in Nonfiction Feature Filmmaking - Hale County This Morning, This Evening - Dir. RaMell Ross; Prod. Joslyn Barnes, Su Kim, and RaMell Ross
- Outstanding Achievement in Direction - Minding the Gap - Bing Liu
- Outstanding Achievement in Production - Free Solo - Elizabeth Chai Vasarhelyi, Jimmy Chin, Evan Hayes and Shannon Dill
- Outstanding Achievement in Cinematography - Free Solo - Jimmy Chin, Clair Popkin and Mikey Schaeffer
- Outstanding Achievement in Editing - Minding the Gap - Bing Liu and Joshua Altman
- Outstanding Achievement in Graphic Design and Animation - Shirkers - Lucas Celler and Sandi Tan
- Outstanding Achievement in Original Music Score - Shirkers - Ishai Adar
- Outstanding Achievement in a Debut Feature Film - Minding the Gap - Bing Liu
- Outstanding Achievement in a Nonfiction Film for Broadcast - Baltimore Rising - Sonja Sohn
- Outstanding Achievement in a Nonfiction Series for Broadcast - America to Me - Steve James
- Spotlight Award - The Distant Barking of Dogs - Simon Lereng Wilmont
- Heterodox Award - American Animals - Bart Layton
- Audience Choice - Free Solo - Elizabeth Chai Vasarhelyi, Jimmy Chin
- Outstanding Achievement in Nonfiction Short Filmmaking - My Dead Dad's Porno Tapes - Charlie Tyrell
- 2019 Legacy Award - Eyes on the Prize - Harry Hampton, Orlando Bagwell, Sheila Curran Bernard, Callie Crossley, James A. DeVinney, Madison D. Lacy, Thomas Ott, Samuel D. Pollard, Terry Kay Rockefeller, Jacqueline Shearer, Paul Stekler, Judith Vecchione

=== Winners in 2020 ===
- Outstanding Achievement in Nonfiction Feature Filmmaking - American Factory - Dir. Steve Bognar and Julia Reichert; Prod. Steve Bognar, Julia Reichert, Jeff Reichert and Julie Parker Benello
- Outstanding Achievement in Direction - American Factory - Steve Bognar and Julia Reichert
- Outstanding Achievement in Production
  - For Sama - Waad al-Kateab
  - The Cave - Kirstine Barford and Sigrid Dyekjær
- Outstanding Achievement in Cinematography - Honeyland - Fejmi Daut and Samir Ljuma
- Outstanding Achievement in Editing - Apollo 11 - Todd Douglas Miller
- Outstanding Achievement in Graphic Design and Animation - The Great Hack - Patrick Cederberg, Matthew Hornick and Ash Thorp
- Outstanding Achievement in Original Music Score - Apollo 11 - Matt Morton
- Outstanding Achievement in a Debut Feature Film - The Disappearance of My Mother - Beniamino Barrese
- Outstanding Achievement in a Nonfiction Film for Broadcast - Leaving Neverland - Dan Reed
- Outstanding Achievement in a Nonfiction Series for Broadcast - Tricky Dick - Mary Robertson
- Outstanding Achievement in Broadcast Cinematography - Homecoming - Mark Ritchie, Julian Klincewicz, Dikayl Rimmasch and Irie Calkins
- Outstanding Achievement in Broadcast Editing - Apollo: Missions to the Moon - David Tillman
- Spotlight Award - Present Award - Shengze Zhu
- Heterodox Award - The Souvenir - Joanna Hogg
- Audience Choice - The Biggest Little Farm - John Chester
- Outstanding Achievement in Nonfiction Short Filmmaking - Ghosts of Sugar Land - Bassam Tariq
- 2020 Legacy Award - Koyaanisqatsi - Godfrey Reggio

== See also ==
- Academy Award for Best Documentary Feature
- BAFTA Award for Best Documentary
- Critics' Choice Documentary Awards
- IDA Documentary Awards
