= China Heavyweight =

- Theatrical release poster
- Directed by: Yung Chang
- Written by: Yung Chang
- Produced by: Bob Moore, Peter Wintonick, Han Yi, Zhao Qi (producers) Daniel Cross, Mila Aung-Thwin, Lixin Fan, Tsiang Ben (exec. producers)
- Starring: Qi Moxiang; He Zongli; Miao Yunfei; Zhao Zhong
- Cinematography: Sun Shaoguang
- Music by: Olivier Alary; Johannes Malfatti (co-composer)
- Distributed by: EyeSteelFilm (Quebec (Canada) / international); Kiinosmith (Canada); Zeitgeist (USA)
- Release date: January 20, 2012 (Sundance Film Festival)
- Country: Canada
- Language: Chinese

China Heavyweight (also known by its Chinese title 千錘百煉) is a 2012 documentary film by the Chinese-Canadian documentary film director Yung Chang and released by EyeSteelFilm. It is Yung Chang's second long feature documentary film after Up the Yangtze from 2007.

== Synopsis ==
In 1959, Mao Zedong had imposed a ban on the sport of boxing in China considering it "too Western and brutal". The ban was lifted in 1987 and boxing began being taught in schools.

The film is about Qi Moxiang, a boxing coach who, alongside Zhao Zhong, the boxing program director, goes to rural China to recruit from ordinary peasant hopefuls to be trained for a possible sporting and Olympic career. The documentary shows his visit to Huili County in the southwestern Sichuan province, and documents the young athletes chosen there.

The film concentrates on two of the boys: Miao Yunfei and He Zhongli whom coach Qi has brought to the Chinese provincial finals. In addition, to provide a role model for his students, Qi decides to fight professionally again against a much younger rival from Japan.

== Accolades ==
The film had its premiere at the 2012 Sundance Film Festival in the World Documentary section. It was nominated for Grand Jury Prize for "World Cinema - Documentary" category. It also best film at the Milan Film Festival and Best Documentary at the Golden Horse Film Festival and Awards in 2012.

It was also an official selection at the Hot Docs Canadian International Documentary Festival.

Zeitgeist Films acquired the rights of distribution of the film in the United States.

== Cast ==
- Qi Moxiang as himself (boxing coach)
- He Zongli as himself (boxer)
- Miao Yunfei as himself (boxer)
- Zhao Zhong as himself (Master)
