= George Sapounidis =

Greek-Canadian musician

Yiorgos Sapounidis better known as George Sapounidis is a Greek Canadian musician, troubadour, statistician and a Sinophile living in Ottawa, Ontario, Canada. He was the subject of 2005 Canadian documentary film entitled Chairman George. The documentary, directed by Daniel Cross and Mila Aung-Thwin and produced by EyeSteelFilm in association with CTV, BBC's "Storyville" series and TV2, tells the story of Sapounidis as a popular musician in China campaigning for approval to perform at the closing ceremonies of 2004 Athens Olympics, when the flag was to be given to Beijing for organizing the 2008 Beijing Olympics.

== Early musical career ==
Sapounidis founded his multicultural band "Ouzo Power" in 1988, giving a new spin to Greek music on the Canadian scene, bringing in jazz elements and translating the songs of the likes of Bob Dylan and Led Zeppelin into Greek for audiences at folk and multicultural music festivals, as well as CBC Television and CBC Radio producing two albums, including a successful CD of international folk songs.

Although he has been performing regularly at all manner of folk festivals, awards ceremonies, multicultural events, variety shows and special events as well as on Canadian radio and television for over 20 years, it was George Sapounidis' concert tours of China that catapulted him to stardom.

== Popularity in China ==
Sapounidis became a Chinese folk-singing sensation who has appeared at international festivals across China; on stage at Beijing's Forbidden City Concert Hall, and for China Central Television.

Ever since the Embassy of the People's Republic of China in Canada invited Sapounidis to perform at an international folk festival in Shanghai in the fall of 2000, he has seen consistent popularity in the country. He has been invited back some 30 times since then – beginning with the Nanning International Arts Festival of Folksongs the same year, a Beijing tour in May 2002 and again, four months later in September 2002. Another music tour followed in the fall of 2003, a concert in December and the ten-day Shanghai Baoshan International Folk Arts Festival again in the fall of 2004.

Sapounidis attributes his success to a special affinity for Chinese culture. He was already skilled at performing in several languages when first asked to sing in Mandarin Chinese. Intrigued, and with help from his Chinese girlfriend, herself an acclaimed poet, he learned a traditional Mandarin folk song over a few weeks. His repertoire of Chinese folk songs began to grow – as did his Mandarin language skills. Soon he was performing for Chinese Embassy officials in Ottawa, which in turn led to an invitation to perform in China.

Upon returning to Ottawa, George formed a new band, The George Sapounidis Trio, with percussionist Ken Easton and Jeremy Moyer, another Sinophile who plays a variety of Chinese stringed instruments. They performed songs, new and old, from around the world. The songs Sapounidis composes in Chinese, by contrast, are sweet and simple reflecting yearning, friendship, loneliness and love. In 2002 he released a CD called Songs about China and Greece to be followed in summer of 2005 with George from Athens to Beijing, comprising a variety of traditional Greek and Chinese folks songs along with personal compositions. Some of the songs were recorded in China with Chinese backup musicians and singers – one was recorded live on the Great Wall – and others were recorded in Canada with Canadian and Greek guest artists using a wide variety of international instruments. His folk songs express the universality of human emotion – the Greek in a passionate extroverted style, the Chinese in a poetic ethereal and far more introverted manner. Yet they complement one another "on stage and within myself." George explains. It's these contradictions, he adds, that feed the artist's soul.

== Campaign for the Olympics ==
In 2001, when Beijing secured the 2008 Olympics bid, Sapounidis saw an opportunity to "build bridges between cultures" in 2004, when the Olympic flag would be passed from Athens to Beijing. These events were recorded in the documentary, EyeSteelFilm's "Chairman George," chronicling the singer's unrelenting pursuit of his dream to perform at the closing ceremonies. Director Daniel Cross and his crew followed Sapounidis across three continents as he tracked down and lobbied Canadian, Greek and Chinese officials, dogging them even onto the Great Wall.

George was an Olympic relay torch-bearer in Montreal. He spent the Athens Olympics in the Olympic Village as a National Olympic Committee Assistant, capitalizing on his Greek and Chinese language skills to assist the Chinese team. It didn't take long before his impromptu performances again attracted both Greek and Chinese radio and television attention. This was followed by an invitation from the Humanistic Olympics Studies Centre at Renmin University to teach a series of classes on Olympic volunteering in Beijing.

== Synopsis of Chairman George ==
The documentary Chairman George follows George's efforts to get to the Olympics. The film synopsis states that:

In Canada, George is a statistician. But in China, George is Elvis... Chairman George is a documentary feature about a Greek-Canadian troubadour who refuses to live anything but an extraordinary life. In Ottawa, Ontario, George is a statistician who lives with his mother. But every few months, he takes an extended leave from his job and heads to China where he metamorphoses into an international man of culture. Armed only with his bouzouki, guitar and cellular phone, he becomes a star in China (with both the critics and the ladies) singing Greek songs in Chinese. He concludes that since he is "the only Greek in the world who can sing in Chinese," it is his duty to perform at the closing ceremonies of the Athens 2004 Summer Olympics, as the torch is passed from Athens to Beijing 2008 Summer Olympics.

== Music for the documentary ==
To accompany the documentary, in 2005 George Sapounidis released his CD George: From Athens to Beijing. Chairman George won awards at the AFI/Silverdocs and at Guangzhou Documentary Festival.

The CD George: From Athens to Beijing was nominated for Best World Music album at the 2005 Canadian Folk Music Awards.

== Greek-Chinese Fusion ==
With his band — bassist Stuart Watkins, guitarist Fred Guignion and drummer/producer Ross Murray — Sapounidis revived the Ouzo Power project, to create an album of rocked-up Greek folk songs. Perhaps inevitably, this led to the artist's most recent evolution: a fusion of Greek and Chinese musical influences that finds Sapounidis and band, including new members Yadong Guan (pipa) and Cindy Yang (ghuzeng), offering a mix of Greek and Chinese songs performed in Mandarin. A full-length album of Sapounidis — now billed as Chairman George, in deference to the documentary — and his band's unique mash of Greek and Chinese influences is to be released internationally in October 2014, to coincide with a 10-city tour of China.
