= Homeless Nation =

Non-profit organization in Montreal, Québec, Canada

HomelessNation.org is a not-for-profit organization based in Montreal, Quebec, Canada. In order to bridge the digital divide, documentary filmmaker Daniel Cross created HomelessNation.org in 2003. A website by and for the homeless, the resource gives people on the street the opportunity to control their own voice and engage the public in a safe and supportive forum. The site's outreach workers teach computer and media skills to facilitate self-expression and community involvement. Improved knowledge and self-esteem help individuals make healthier life choices and transition off the street. The project has directly impacted thousands of individuals across Canada and is now gaining ground internationally. The project has won 4 major ICT awards, including a prestigious World Summit Award.

== About ==
HomelessNation.org is a non-profit internet endeavor that started in 2006. It is a Canadian national collective voice by and for Canada's homeless population. It was founded by a documentary film director Daniel Cross (executive producer), alongside his film company partner Mila Aung-Thwin (producer), Brett Gaylor (filmmaker and web architect) and Anuj Khosla (administrator). It has a number of locations in Canada including Montreal (Quebec), St. John's, (Newfoundland), Victoria and Vancouver, (British Columbia).

Homeless Nation's outreach workers across Canada work in a variety of ways in collaboration with the homeless community in shelters, day-centres, squats, at protests, community events, on the street and online. It is also dedicated in ensuring that digital tools for media, learning and communication are made available for homeless Canadians by placing donated computers into shelters and drop-in centres, thus providing opportunities to create audio, visual or written testimonials.

According to the official site of the organization, "Homeless Nation" aims at building and strengthening communities, both virtual and actual, across Canada, providing access to the internet, media and training to Canada's homeless population, encouraging discussion and learning on social issues surrounding homelessness. It also tries to create dialogue between Canada's homeless and mainstream society to counter isolation and marginalization, recycles and re-purposes technology for use by Canada's homeless communities and tries to break down stereotypes and barriers in the society.

It was founded by Daniel Cross, a documentary filmmaker whose films deal with social justice and Canada's homeless. He made the films The Street: A Film with the Homeless and S.P.I.T.: Squeegee Punks in Traffic. Out of the movie, came the Idea Forum, where these stories would not be lost and where Montreal's homeless community could share their stories.

== Awards ==
- 2009 World Summit Award for e-Inclusion and Participation
- 2009 New Media Award
- 2008 Canadian New Media Award
- 2008 Society for New Communications Research Award
