= Fortunate Son (film) =

- Theatrical release poster
- Directed by: Tony Asimakopoulos
- Screenplay by: Tony Asimakopoulos
- Produced by: Mila Aung-Thwin; Daniel Cross; Bob Moore
- Starring: Tony Asimakopoulos; Aristomenis and Vassiliki Asimakopoulos; Natalie Karneef; Ruble
- Cinematography: Tony Asimakopoulos
- Edited by: Tony Asimakopoulos
- Music by: Philip Karneef
- Distributed by: EyeSteelFilm
- Release date: 20 October 2011 (Montréal Festival du Nouveau Cinéma)
- Running time: 78 minutes
- Country: Canada
- Languages: English and Greek

Fortunate Son (French title Le fils béni, Greek καλότυχος γιος, Kalotyhos gios) is an autobiographical feature documentary film by Tony Asimakopoulos, a Canadian film director of Greek origin. The film was released in 2011 and produced by Mila Aung-Thwin, Daniel Cross and Bob Moore of the Montreal-based film production company, EyeSteelFilm. The film is in English and Greek, with subtitles in English and French. As Asimakopoulos' first documentary, the film has been called "A searing documentary about family" by Liz Braun of the Toronto Sun, as well as "[...] a story of what binds families together, and what it means to be loved" by Daniel Pratt of Exclaim!.

== Synopsis ==
Set in the mid 2000s, Fortunate Son documents Asimakopoulos’ return to his childhood home of Montreal after fleeing to Ottawa in the late 1990s to undergo self-imposed drug rehabilitation. Now in his forties, post-detox, Asimakopoulos seeks to reconnect with his parents, and attempts to mend their relationship. Over the course of a couple of years, Asimakopoulos turns the camera on the private life of his overbearing mother Vassiliki and ailing father Aristomenis and the patterns of dysfunction they share. As part of his recovery process, Asimakopoulos aims to gain perspective on his parents’ experience of his troubled youth in hopes that it will guide a new chapter in his life with his partner, Natalie.

== Style ==
Fortunate Son is composed of a medley of cinematic techniques that achieve a distinct style that hinges between that of a traditional documentary film and a Cinéma vérité. Asimakopoulos uses scenes from his earlier short films, with actors playing him and his family, along with voice-over and contemporary footage to illustrate his past.

== Screenings ==
The film was shown at the prestigious International Documentary Film Festival Amsterdam (IDFA), Montreal's Festival du nouveau cinéma in 2011, as well as the Thessaloniki International Film Festival, Rendez-vous du cinéma québécois and the Los Angeles Greek Film Festival. It was also shown at the Los Angeles, Chicago, London and Sydney Greek Film Festivals. Public screenings started in Montreal on 1 June 2012.

== Awards ==
Fortunate Son was the 7th highest-grossing theatrical documentary in Quebec in 2012. The same year, Asimakopoulos was given a special award by the National Ethnic Press and Media Council of Canada, for "Exceptional Services Rendered to Journalism & Cinema".
