= Bad News Brown (musician) =

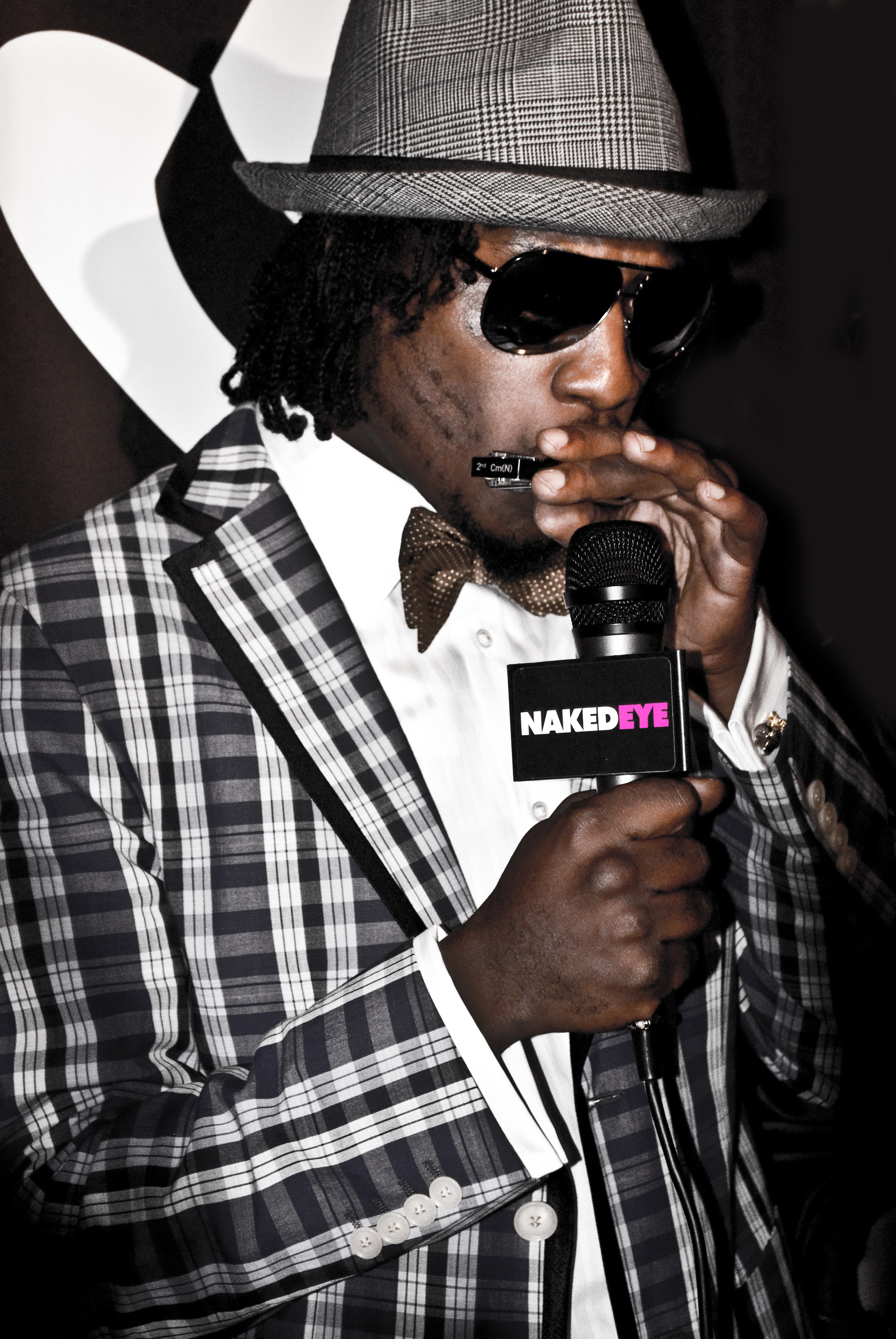
- Bad News Brown in Montreal, 2010

Background information
- Also known as: Briz Brown
- Born: Paul Frappier; May 8, 1977; Haiti
- Died: February 11, 2011 (aged 33) Montreal, Quebec, Canada
- Genres: Hip hop, soul
- Occupations: Rapper, singer, harmonica player
- Instruments: Vocals, harmonica
- Years active: 2001–2011
- Label: Trilateral Entertainment Inc.
- Website: badnewsbrown.com

Paul Frappier (May 8, 1977 – February 11, 2011), better known by his stage name Bad News Brown (at times, also as BNB and Briz Brown), was a Canadian entertainer, musician, and hip hop MC of Haitian origin. He was known for pairing the sound of his chief instrument, the harmonica, with hip-hop beats and rhymes. Frappier started out busking in Montreal in streets and subway stations. He later toured and opened for many well-known hip hop acts or as background musician. He also appeared as an impromptu host in Music for a Blue Train, the 2003 documentary about busker musicians in the Montreal Metro subway train system. In 2004, he signed a management deal with E-Stunt Entertainment Group. In 2009, he established his own record label, Trilateral Entertainment Inc., and released his debut album Born 2 Sin. Brown was found murdered in an alley near the Lachine Canal in Montreal on February 11, 2011. The feature film BumRush, featuring Brown in a leading role, premiered posthumously on April 1, 2011.

== Beginnings ==
Born in Haiti, Paul Frappier moved at a young age to Quebec, first living in Saint-Lazare and Hudson before settling in Montreal with his adopted Québécois family in the Little Burgundy area. In school, he struggled with dyslexia. He left home in his teenage years, and quickly discovered a talent for the harmonica that could earn him a living by busking on the street and in Montreal Metro stations. "Busking was the smartest thing I ever did in my life," he says. "It paid my bills, bought me my studio, and within two years I estimate 50 per cent of the city knew I existed."

Frappier developed his sound by playing in the streets, combining his skill as a blues/jazz harmonica player with his love of hip-hop. He adopted his stage name from the suggestion of fellow Montreal rapper Misery, which coincidentally was the name of his childhood favourite WWF wrestler, Allen Coage (nicknamed Bad News Brown).

Brown quickly became accredited as the best busker in Montreal by the weekly arts and music magazine, the Montreal Mirror.

Frappier lived with his girlfriend Natasha. He was also the father of a boy, Izaiah, for whom he had joint custody.

== Music career ==
Brown's debut album, Born 2 Sin, was released on iTunes on July 28, 2009, and in stores on August 18, 2009, on Brown's independent record label Trilateral Entertainment Inc. The album was distributed by Fontana North/Universal Music Canada.

Brown crafted the tracks on Born 2 Sin with production assistance from Haig V, Dirtwork, Parafino, C4, Made By Monkeys and Edi Burgz. Brown said, "Haig is one of the main producers on the album, with six tracks. He's a long-time friend who has worked with the likes of Bran Van 3000 and Muzion. I used to listen to and watch him in his studio back in the day, and I used a lot of his instrumental tracks on this album. I went through his archives, picked out stuff I liked, went home, worked on them, brought them back, and we worked it from there." The album was chosen as "disc of the week" in Vol.25 No.10 of the Montreal Mirror weekly newspaper. Brown described the album's style as "Harmonic Hip-Hop" or "Electronic Triptronic Melodic Harmonics".

The single "Feeling Me On" was released as part of the Universal Music compilation Hip Hop Rai 2, which sold over 50,000 units in Europe.

Brown toured over 200 venues during his career, opening for Snoop Dogg, Kanye West, 50 Cent, Aerosmith, The Eagles, N.E.R.D., Soulja Boy, Ciara, Common, Lloyd Banks, Jadakiss, John Legend, Gym Class Heroes, Ice Cube, Booba, and Sinik, and accompanying on stage Nas, Ice-T, Cypress Hill, De La Soul, and Daniel Merriweather.

Brown frequently took on the role of a motivational speaker, addressing youth and participating in charities. As part of the "Music With Meaning" tour in 2009, he spoke to an audience of teenage boys in a youth detention center.

== Film career ==
=== Music for a Blue Train ===
Brown's reputation as Montreal's best street performer led him to be chosen as the host for the 2003 documentary film Music for a Blue Train, a bluesy portrait of musicians who busk in the Montreal Metro. The documentary was written and directed by Mila Aung-Thwin of EyeSteelFilm and produced by Germaine Ying Gee Wong for the National Film Board of Canada.

=== BumRush ===
At the time of his murder, Brown was acting in an upcoming film about Montreal street gangs. The film, BumRush, was directed by Québécois director Michel Jetté. Brown plays a leading role as "Loosecanon", a high-ranking, violent gang leader on a fictional "Rue I.B. 11." in Montreal. Brown was co-producing the film and was involved in its casting. Some of his original songs from his album Born 2 Sin were included in the film's soundtrack. BumRush premiered posthumously on April 1, 2011, in Canadian movie theaters. Jetté announced that the film would serve as a tribute to the slain artist.

== Death ==
Brown's body was found in an alley on February 11, 2011, in an industrial area near the Lachine Canal in Montreal. Police said there were "clear signs of violence" on his upper body and pronounced him dead at the scene.

Brown was reportedly preparing for a show in Quebec City to be held a day later. He was with his girlfriend until about 10 PM, when he told her he was going out to meet someone. Around midnight, a couple who had been out walking found him lying on the ground at the intersection of Richmond Street and William Street.

As of 2026, no news has been released regarding Brown's death.

== Discography ==
=== Studio albums ===
Year	Album details
2009	Born 2 Sin: First studio album; Released: June 28, 2009; Label: Trilateral Entertainment Inc; Format: CD

=== Mixtapes ===
- 2009: G'd Up From the Street Up

=== Singles ===
Year	Title	Album
2009	"Soul Clap"	non-album single
2009	"Touch Her Body"	Born 2 Sin
2009	"Born to Sin"	Born 2 Sin
2011	"Harm's Delight"	non-album single

== Filmography ==
Acting

- 2003: Music for a Blue Train (as impromptu host)
- 2011: BumRush (as Loosecanon)

Production

- 2011: BumRush – co-producer

== See also ==
- List of murdered hip hop musicians
- List of unsolved murders (2000–present)
