= The Frog Princes =

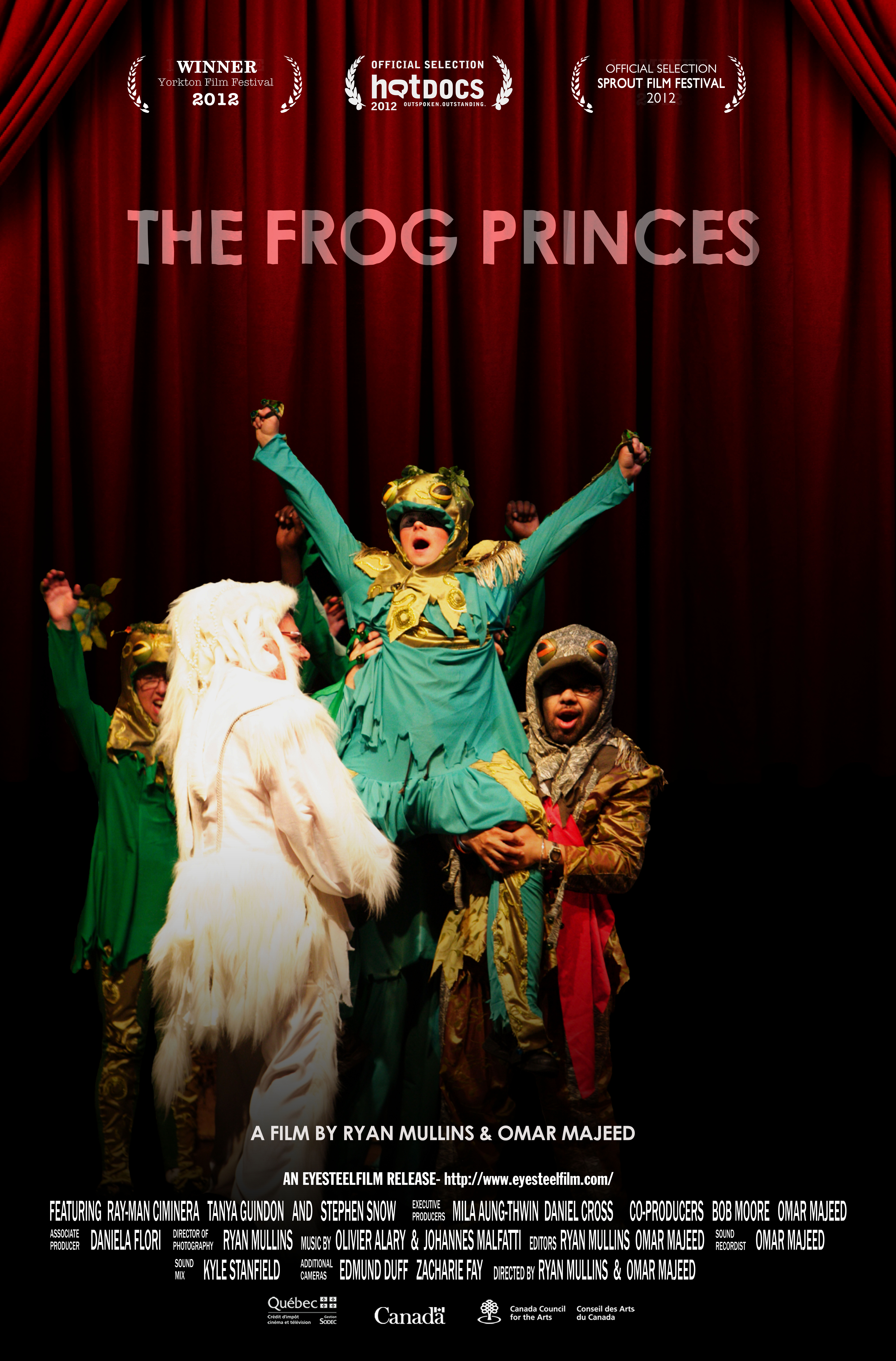
- Theatrical release poster
- Directed by: Omar Majeed; Ryan Mullins
- Produced by: Bob Moore; Daniel Cross (Exec. producer); Mila Aung-Thwin (exec. producer)
- Starring: Ray-Man; Dr Stephen Snow
- Cinematography: Ryan Mullins
- Edited by: Omar Majeed, Ryan Mullins
- Music by: Olivier Alary; Johannes Malfatti
- Production company: EyeSteelFilm
- Release date: August 6, 2011 (Montreal)
- Running time: 69 minutes
- Country: Canada

The Frog Princes is a 2011 documentary film directed by Omar Majeed and Ryan Mullins. This film follows the story of a Montreal-based theater troupe training for a play adaptation of the fairytale The Princess and the Frog. All twenty actors in the troupe have intellectual and developmental disabilities. The film is shot as a play within a play. The film centers on the lead actor in the play, Ray-Man (named by his parents after artist Man Ray), a young adult with Down syndrome. The film follows the personal struggles of the cast as they prepare for the play, working with the director, Dr. Stephen Snow. Snow is a trained theatre director at The Centre for the Arts in Human Development at Concordia University.

The documentary is distributed by EyeSteelFilm Productions. The film was shown on CBC Television on 6 August 2011 during prime time. It was also shown at the Hot Docs, the Toronto International Documentary film Festival. This film was also screened at the Abilities Arts Festival in Toronto. This film is rated PG or parental guidance suggested.
