= Midwives (2022 film) =

2022 film by Hnin Ei Hlaing

- Directed by: Hnin Ei Hlaing
- Produced by: Mila Aung-Thwin
- Edited by: Mila Aung-Thwin; Hnin Ei Hlaing; Ryan Mullins
- Music by: Olivier Alary; Johannes Malfatti
- Production companies: EyeSteelFilm; AMA FILM; Snow Films
- Release date: January 21, 2022; (Sundance)
- Running time: 92 min.
- Country: Myanmar
- Languages: Burmese, Rakhine

Midwives is a 2022 Burmese documentary film directed by Hnin Ei Hlaing, exploring the relationship between a Buddhist Bamar midwife and her Muslim Rohingya apprentice in a village in Rakhine State in western Myanmar. The film premiered at the 2022 Sundance Film Festival, where it won the Special Jury Prize for Excellence in Vérité Filmmaking.

== Premise ==
Filmed over the course of five years, the film follows Hla, a Buddhist midwife, operating a makeshift maternity clinic with her husband from their home, who has taken on Nyo Nyo, a Rohingya Muslim, as her apprentice. Hla offers maternity care to the local Rohingya population, who are prohibited from travelling to a nearby town, and does so at the chagrin of the local Buddhist population. During the course of the film, legislation is passed that ultimately prohibits Hla from treating Rohingya patients. While supportive of Nyo Nyo, Hla uses derogatory language to refer to her and other Rohingya patients, and her husband is observed listening to music about maintaining the ethnic purity of the Bamar population.

Nyo Nyo, who initially considers leaving her husband and moving to Yangon to formally study midwifery, falls pregnant with her third child and ultimately decides to remain in Rakhine State, where she goes on to set up her own maternity clinic with the support of a local Muslim women's microloan club and her husband. At the same time, there is an increase in anti-Rohingya sentiment in Myanmar, and the film concludes shortly after the 2021 coup d'état in which Aung San Suu Kyi was removed as the country's leader and replaced by Min Aung Hlaing of the Tatmadaw.

== Production ==
Hnin Eli Hlaing was born in Rakhine State but subsequently moved to Berlin, and said she was inspired to make a film about the Buddhist and Rohingya communities there after being shocked to hear of the conflict between them following the relative peace of her childhood. Hlaing said she was pulled to make the documentary due to contradiction of Hla offering maternity care to Rohingya women, often at great risk to her own safety and wellbeing, while also expressing casual racism towards the Rohingya community.

== Release ==
The film had its world premiere on 21 January 2022 at the Sundance Film Festival. In the United Kingdom, it was aired as part of the Storyville series on BBC Four on 4 October 2022.

The film's producer, Mila Aung-Thwin, spoke about the risks to Hla and Nyo Nyo should the film be released in Myanmar while the military junta remains in power. In an interview with NPR, she explained that measures including financial support and a route out of the country had been prepared should the film be leaked in Myanmar.

== Reception ==
Midwives currently has a perfect score of 100% on Rotten Tomatoes, based on 13 reviews. Writing in The Guardian, Peter Bradshaw gave the film four stars, describing the film as a "sombre documentary". Time Out similarly rated the film four stars, calling it "a stirring, incisive doc about a Buddhist and a Muslim defying Myanmar's bitter ethnic divisions".

== Recognition ==
Midwives won the Special Jury Prize for Excellence in Vérité Filmmaking at the 2022 Sundance Film Festival, where filmmaker and jury member Dawn Porter described it as "a surprising story of female self-determination in the face of militaristic oppression, directed with a rigor that demonstrates the resilience of both the filmmaker and her subjects".
