= This Is Not a Movie =

This Is Not a Movie may refer to:

- This Is Not a Movie (2010 film), a Mexican science fiction film directed by Olallo Rubio
- This Is Not a Movie (2019 film), a Canadian documentary film directed by Yung Chang
- This Is Not a Film, an Iranian documentary film directed by Jafar Panahi and Mojtaba Mirtahmasb
