= Inukjuak – Innalik School =

Primary and secondary school in Inukjuak, Quebec, Canada

Coordinates: 58.4559°N 78.1048°W

Inukjuak – Innalik School, part of the Kativik School Board, is a primary and secondary school in Inukjuak, Nunavik, Quebec with more than 400 students. The school program is divided into three sections:

- Inuktitut program—kindergarten and primary cycle (more than 100 students)
- French section as a second language—primary and secondary cycles (around 150 students)
- English section as a second language—primary and secondary cycle (around 150 students)

The teaching staff is more than 40 teachers including 15 in the Inuit section and around 5 specialist teachers in various domains.

== School in Inuuvunga: I Am Inuk, I Am Alive Documentary ==
The school became famous after being featured in the 2004 documentary Inuuvunga: I Am Inuk, I Am Alive (58 minutes) when 8 Inuit high school students from the school documented their final year in the high school.

The film was in Inuktitut with subtitles in English and was produced by National Film Board of Canada (NFB), (including Sally Bochner as executive producer and Pierre Lapointe as producer.

NFB had dispatched EyeSteelFilm directors Daniel Cross, Mila Aung-Thwin, Brett Gaylor to Inukjuak – Innalik School, Nunavik, Quebec, to teach the students the skills of filming. The students who took part in the filming were:

- Bobby Echalook
- Caroline Ningiuk
- Dora Ohaituk
- Laura Iqaluk
- Linus Kasudluak
- Rita-Lucy Ohaituk
- Sarah Idlout
- Willia Ningeok

== See also ==
- Daniel Cross
- Brett Gaylor
- Mila Aung-Thwin
