= Cinema Eye Honors Legacy Award =

The Cinema Eye Honors Legacy Award is an annual award given at the Cinema Eye Honors since 2010.

== List of recipients ==
=== 2010s ===
- 2010: Sherman's March - Ross McElwee
- 2011: Grey Gardens - Albert Maysles, David Maysles, Ellen Hovde, Muffie Meyer and Susan Froemke
- 2012: Titicut Follies - Frederick Wiseman
- 2013: The War Room - Chris Hegedus and D.A. Pennebaker
- 2014: Harlan County, USA - Barbara Kopple
- 2015 Paris is Burning - Jennie Livingston
- 2016 American Movie - Chris Smith
- 2017 The Times of Harvey Milk - Rob Epstein
- 2018 When We Were Kings - Leon Gast
- 2019 Eyes on the Prize - Harry Hampton, Orlando Bagwell, Sheila Curran Bernard, Callie Crossley, James A. DeVinney, Madison D. Lacy, Thomas Ott, Samuel D. Pollard, Terry Kay Rockefeller, Jacqueline Shearer, Paul Stekler, Judith Vecchione

=== 2020s ===
- 2020: Koyaanisqatsi - Godfrey Reggio
- 2021: The Watermelon Woman – Cheryl Dunye
- 2022: Crumb – Terry Zwigoff
- 2023: The Decline of Western Civilization – Penelope Spheeris
- 2024: Hearts and Minds – Peter Davis
- 2025: Portrait of Jason – Shirley Clarke, Burden of Dreams – Les Blank, Sans Soleil – Chris Marker and Tongues Untied – Marlon T. Riggs

== See also ==
- Academy Award for Best Documentary Feature
- National Film Registry
