= Chairman George =

- Directed by: Daniel Cross; Mila Aung-Thwin
- Produced by: EyeSteelFilm; CTV; BBC; TV2 (Denmark)
- Starring: George Sapounidis
- Release date: 2005
- Running time: 73 minutes
- Country: Canada
- Language: English

Chairman George is a 73-minute 2005 Canadian documentary film about the Greek Canadian musician / troubadour and statistician George Sapounidis. The documentary is directed by Daniel Cross and Mila Aung-Thwin and produced by EyeSteelFilm in association with CTV, BBC's "Storyville" series and TV2.

== Synopsis ==
In Canada, George is a statistician. But in China, George is Elvis ... Chairman George is a documentary feature about a Greek-Canadian troubadour who refuses to live anything but an extraordinary life. ln Ottawa, Ontario, George is a statistician who lives with his mother. But every few months, he takes an extended leave from his job and heads to China where he metamorphoses into an international man of culture. Armed only with his bouzouki, guitar and cellular phone, he becomes a star in China (with both the critics and the ladies) singing Greek songs in Chinese. He concludes that since he is "the only Greek in the world who can sing in Chinese," it is his duty to perform at the closing ceremonies of the Athens 2004 Summer Olympics, as the torch is passed from Athens to Beijing organizer of the 2008 Summer Olympics.

== Festivals and awards ==
Chairman George won awards at the AFI/Silverdocs and at Guangzhou Documentary Festival.

== Music of George Sapounidis ==
Accompanying the documentary in 2005, George Sapounidis released his CD George: From Athens to Beijing Sapounidis is a Chinese folk-singing sensation who has appeared at international festivals across China; on stage at Beijing's Forbidden City Concert Hall, and for China Central Television. In addition to Greek, he sings in more than five other languages including Mandarin.
