= Do Not Track (film) =

2015 web documentary directed by Brett Gaylor

- Traque interdite
- Directed by: Brett Gaylor
- Produced by: National Film Board of Canada, Arte, Bayerischer Rundfunk, Upian
- Starring: Danah Boyd; Ethan Zuckerman; Kate Crawford; Cory Doctorow, Alicia Garza
- Release date: April 14, 2015 (online premiere)
- Languages: English; French; German

Do Not Track (French: Traque interdite) is a 2015 online interactive documentary series about internet privacy, conceived and directed by Brett Gaylor. The series, which combines short videos and interactive elements, seeks to educate people about who may be tracking them online and the amount of private information that may be extrapolated from their Internet activities. It interviews experts and activists such as Danah Boyd, Ethan Zuckerman, Kate Crawford, Cory Doctorow and Alicia Garza about how personal online data is being collected and used, and allows users see in real-time how their own personal data is being tracked.

This web documentary is an international co-production of the National Film Board of Canada, Arte, Bayerischer Rundfunk and Upian. Its first two episodes were launched on April 14, to be followed by five more installments released once every two weeks. Do Not Track was also presented as an interactive installation in the Storyscapes section of the Tribeca Film Festival. It was nominated for Best Original Program or Series, Non-Fiction at the 4th Canadian Screen Awards. Do Not Track received a Peabody Award for the Web category, an International Documentary Association Award for Best Series, and a Prix Gémeaux for Best Interactive Series.

== See also ==
- Do Not Track
