= Open Source Cinema =

Canadian production website

Open Source Cinema was a collaborative website created to produce the documentary film RiP!: A Remix Manifesto, a co-production with Montreal's EyeSteelFilm and the National Film Board of Canada (NFB). It was launched in 2004 as a public beta, and in 2007 launched at the South By Southwest Interactive festival on the Drupal platform.

The site served as a repository for all of the footage for Basement Tapes, licensed under a Creative Commons license, which the audience is free to remix. The site also hosted user-generated remixes that have subsequently been edited into the final film.

The website was created by Montreal filmmaker Brett Gaylor. He was member of the panel of experts during South by Southwest venue in 2007.

Gaylor's Basement Tapes project and feedbacks blossomed into a documentary that was renamed prior to theatrical release to become RiP!: A Remix Manifesto, an "open source" documentary about copyright and remix culture. Created over a period of six years, the film features the collaborative remix work of hundreds of people who have contributed to the Open Source Cinema website, helping to create, according to Gaylor, the "world's first open source documentary".

In September, 2010, the site was closed.

== Past projects ==
The Projects section of the site contained tasks and call to action from filmmakers. The past projects included:

- Preempting Dissent -- Open Sourcing Secrecy: In collaboration with researchers and filmmakers at the Infoscape Research Lab at Ryerson University and the Department of Communication, Florida State University, Open Source Cinema is hosting the collaborative production of “Preempting Dissent -- Open Sourcing Secrecy”, a documentary based on the book by Greg Elmer and Andy Opel.
- Turcot: A collaborative documentary film documenting the city of Montreal’s plan to expropriate hundreds of citizens to rebuild the crumbling Turcot exchange. The film uses the micro-example of this massive infrastructure project to examine the future of cities, and the right of citizens to determine the future of their city themselves.
- Homeless Nation 2010: A documentary on the effect of the upcoming 2010 Olympic games on Vancouver’s shrinking housing market, created by those most effected: The Homeless. Created collaboratively with the citizens of www.homelessnation.org, an award-winning website created by and for the homeless of Canada.
- RiP!: A Remix Manifesto 2.0: A project based around Brett Gaylor's documentary, RiP!: A Remix Manifesto. This project invites users to remix the original film and upload their contributions to be included in a new, improved version.

== See also ==
- RiP!: A Remix Manifesto
- Brett Gaylor
- Creative Commons
- Open source
- Copyleft
- Public domain
