= Brett Gaylor =

Canadian documentary filmmaker

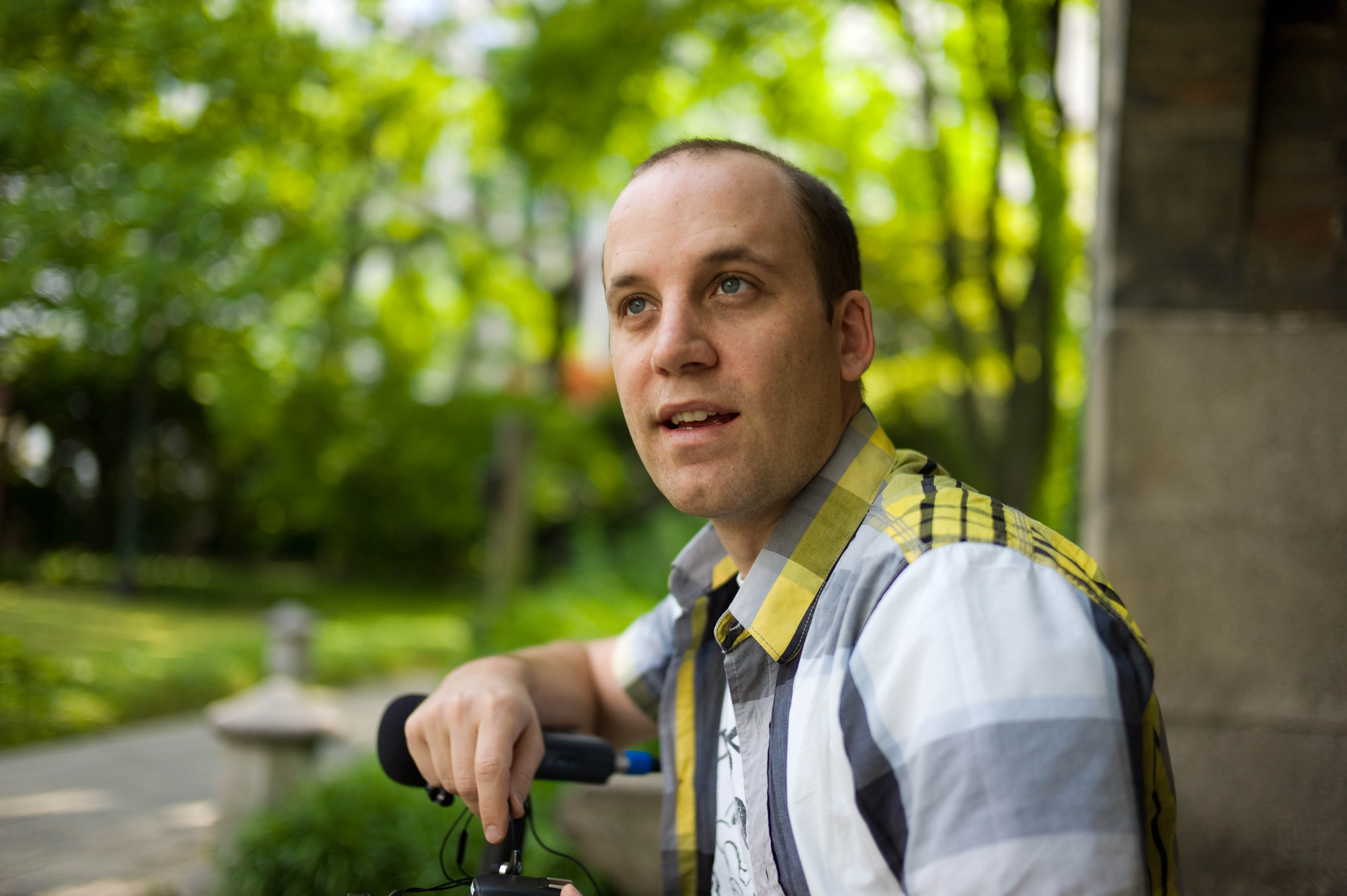
- Born: 1977 (age 48–49); Galiano Island, British Columbia
- Occupation: documentary filmmaker
- Years active: 2000s-present
- Notable work: RiP!: A Remix Manifesto, Do Not Track

Brett Gaylor is a Canadian documentary filmmaker living in Victoria, British Columbia. He grew up on Galiano Island, British Columbia. He was formerly the VP of Mozilla's Webmaker Program. His documentary, Do Not Track, explores privacy and the web economy.

He was a founding member/director of EyeSteelFilm documentary production company and its head of new media.

He was the founder of the Open Source Cinema project and the web producer of Homeless Nation.

He served as executive producer of Stealing Ur Feelings, Noah Levenson's interactive film about emotion recognition AI in consumer applications.

== Documentaries ==
He took part, alongside his fellow directors Daniel Cross and Mila Aung-Thwin (all three of the EyeSteelFilm production company) in a National Film Board of Canada initiative to teach Inuit students in a high school in Inukjuak, Nunavik (Quebec) to document their final year in the high school through film. The result was Inuuvunga: I Am Inuk, I Am Alive a joint 58-minute 2004 documentary by 8 students from the Inukjuak - Innalik School.

His 2008 film RiP!: A Remix Manifesto is a documentary about "the changing concept of copyright". RiP!: A Remix Manifesto is a call to overhaul copyright laws. As the title suggests, this documentary is particularly interested in the "legally grey area" of remixing existing works.

His 2015 web documentary Do Not Track, explored issues related to internet privacy.

His 2018 short animation OK Google chronicled a year in his son's life via Google Assistant searches.

His 2020 film The Internet of Everything explored the internet of things and was nominated for a Canadian Screen Award for Best Documentary Program.

His 2021 web documentary Discriminator explored how his flickr photos were used in training the megaface database. The documentary featured original research by Adam Harvey. The project was nominated for a Canadian Screen Award.

He collaborated with the Doha Debates to produce the 2024 podcast series Necessary Tomorrows.

== Festivals and awards ==
RiP!: A Remix Manifesto was shown at the International Documentary Film Festival Amsterdam (IDFA) in November 2008, where it won the Audience Choice Award.

In December 2008, it was shown during the Whistler Film Festival, winning the Cadillac People's Choice Award.

It won the Audience Special Jury Prize in Festival du Nouveau Cinéma in Montreal and was a Special Selection at South by Southwest Film Festival (also known as SXSW). It also won the audience awards at the Ann Arbor Film Festival and the Encounters Documentary festival in South Africa.

In 2009, Gaylor was named the winner of the Don Haig Award from the Hot Docs Canadian International Documentary Festival.

Do Not Track presented as an interactive installation in the Storyscapes section of the Tribeca Film Festival. It was nominated for Best Original Program or Series, Non-Fiction at the 4th Canadian Screen Awards. Do Not Track received a Peabody Award for the Web category, an International Documentary Association Award for Best Series, and a Prix Gémeaux for Best Interactive Series.

OK Google received a 2019 Webby Award.
