= Inuuvunga: I Am Inuk, I Am Alive =

- Directed by: Daniel Cross; Mila Aung-Thwin; Brett Gaylor; 8 students from Innalik School
- Produced by: National Film Board of Canada
- Starring: Inukjuak – Innalik School students
- Release date: 2004
- Running time: 58 minutes
- Country: Canada
- Language: Inuktitut with English subtitles

Inuuvunga: I Am Inuk, I Am Alive (Inuktitut: ᐃᓅᕗᖓ) is a joint 58-minute 2004 documentary about Inuit high school students in Inukjuak, Nunavik, Quebec, documenting their final year in the high school.

Filmed in Inuktitut with subtitles in English, it was produced by National Film Board of Canada (NFB), (including Sally Bochner as executive producer and Pierre Lapointe as producer) and chronicles the students' efforts to learn how to come of age in a rapidly changing culture, while coping with issues like suicide and substance abuse.

NFB dispatched EyeSteelFilm directors Daniel Cross, Mila Aung-Thwin, Brett Gaylor to the Inukjuak – Innalik School in Nunavik, Quebec, to teach the students the skills of filming. The students who took part in the filming were Bobby Echalook, Caroline Ningiuk, Dora Ohaituk (herself a victim of suicide in 2004), Laura Iqaluk, Linus Kasudluak, Rita-Lucy Ohaituk, Sarah Idlout and Willia Ningeok.
