= Music for a Blue Train =

- Directed by: Mila Aung-Thwin
- Produced by: Germaine Ying Gee Wong
- Starring: Bad News Brown (Paul Frappier), Montreal Metro buskers
- Release date: 2003
- Running time: 48 minutes
- Country: Canada

Music for a Blue Train is a 48-minute 2003 documentary about busker musicians in the Montreal Metro subway train system. It was written and directed by Mila Aung-Thwin of EyeSteelFilm and produced by Germaine Ying Gee Wong for the National Film Board of Canada.

A harmonica player known as Bad News Brown (real name Paul Frappier) acts as an impromptu host in the documentary bringing the viewers snippets of the lives of musicians in Montreal's subway system – The Metro – run by Société de transport de Montréal (STM) that gives around 60 spots on a first-come, first-served basis, provided the musician-busker registers his name early enough as soon as the Metro opens to the public and returns during his assigned time to perform for an hour or two, amidst indifference from most passersby or, at times, a token word of encouragement.
