= Ryan Mullins =

Canadian film director (born 1981)

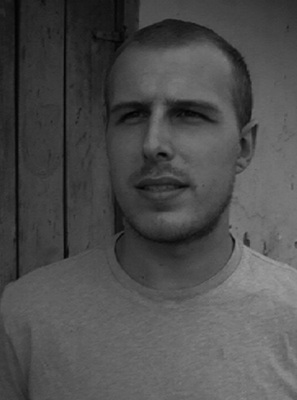
- Born: Ryan Mullins; 1981 (age 44–45); Montreal, Quebec, Canada
- Occupation: Film director
- Years active: 2006–present

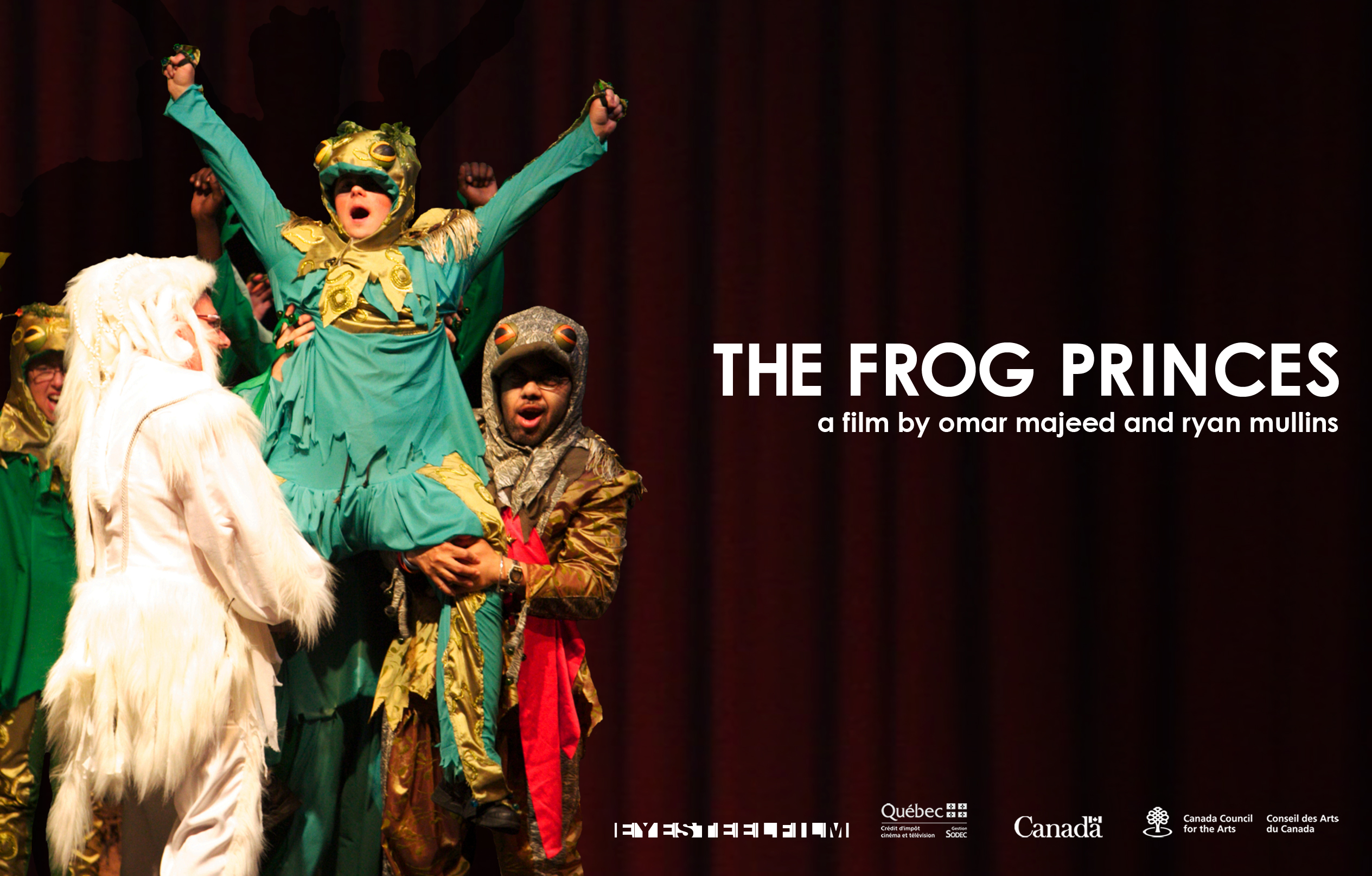
The Frog Princes

Ryan Mullins (born 1981) is a Canadian film director, cinematographer and editor. He is part of the Montreal-based Canadian film production company, EyeSteelFilm. His directing credits include the documentary short Volta, and the feature documentary The Frog Princes. The film won a Golden Sheaf at the 2012 Yorkton Film Festival, and was also awarded the NFB Kathleen Shannon Award for a documentary film that "allows people outside the dominant culture to speak for themselves".

At the 2015 Hot Docs film festival in Toronto, Mullins won the Emerging Canadian Filmmaker Award for Chameleon.

== Biography ==
Ryan made his first short documentary, Volta in 2009. The film looks at an aging cinema in rural Ghana and the people it affected in this small town. Volta made its world premiere at the Toronto International Film Festival (TIFF), and went on to play at South by Southwest (SxSW) and various others. Mullins' first feature documentary The Frog Princes, co-directed with Omar Majeed, follows the behind-the-scenes efforts of a special needs theatre troupe, as they work to mount an ambitious adaptation of The Frog and the Princess. The film premiered at Hot Docs 2012. Mullins is currently working on his second feature documentary, produced by Eyesteelfilm.

== Filmography ==
Director

- 2009: Volta (short)
- 2011: The Frog Princes (documentary)
- 2015: Chameleon (documentary)

Editor

- 2026: The Ultra Runner
