= Don Haig Award =

The Don Haig Award is an annual award, presented by the Hot Docs Canadian International Documentary Festival for distinguished achievement by a Canadian independent documentary film producer with a film in that year's festival program. Despite the requirement to have a film in that year's festival lineup, however, the award is not presented for that specific film, but in consideration of the recipient's overall body of work.

From 2017 to 2021 the recipient was empowered to choose an emerging female documentary filmmaker to receive a CA$5,000 career development grant.

The award is named in memory of pioneering Canadian documentary producer Don Haig.

The award was originally presented in 2004, in partnership between the Don Haig Foundation and the Canadian Film Centre, before being transferred to Hot Docs in 2006. In some early years, the award jury also presented a special jury prize to a second filmmaker, although this has not happened since 2012.

== Winners ==
=== Canadian Film Centre ===
- 2004 - Aubrey Nealon
- 2005 - Rob Stefaniuk

=== Hot Docs ===
- 2006 - Guylaine Dionne
- 2007 - Hubert Davis
- 2007 - Yung Chang
- 2009 - Brett Gaylor
- 2010 - Philip Lyall, Nimisha Mukerji
- 2011 - Rama Rau
- 2012 - Mia Donovan
- 2013 - Merit Jensen Carr
- 2014 - Michael McNamara
- 2015 - Anne Pick
- 2016 - Ed Barreveld
- 2017 - Daniel Cross
- 2018 - Ina Fichman
- 2019 - Peter Raymont
- 2020 - Bob Moore
- 2021 - Lalita Krishna
- 2022 - Mila Aung-Thwin
- 2023 - Bonnie Thompson
- 2024 - Alison Duke
- 2025 - Cornelia Principe
- 2026 - Jennifer Holness

== Special jury award ==
- 2006 - Sean Garrity
- 2009 - Tracey Deer
- 2012 - Charles Officer

== Development grant recipients ==
- 2017 - Kalina Bertin
- 2018 - Fanny Drew, Sarah Mannering
- 2019 - Fazila Amiri
- 2020 - Hnin Ei Hlaing
- 2021 - Elizabeth D. Costa
