= Primas (film) =

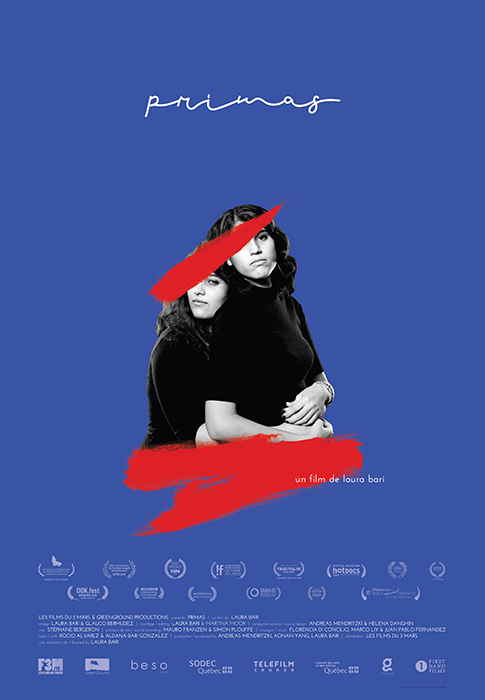
- Directed by: Laura Bari
- Produced by: Andreas Mendritzki, Aonan Yang, Laura Bari
- Starring: Rocío Álvarez, Aldana Bari Gonzalez
- Cinematography: Laura Bari, Glauco Bermudez
- Edited by: Laura Bari
- Music by: Florencia Di Concilio
- Distributed by: First Hand Films, Films du 3 mars
- Release date: November 17, 2017 (IDFA)
- Running time: 95 minutes
- Countries: Canada, Argentina
- Language: Spanish

Primas is a 2017 Canadian documentary film directed by Laura Bari. It is a coming-of-age portrait of two Argentine teenagers who, in the wake of odious crimes that interrupted their childhood, free themselves from the shadows of the past. First in Argentina, then during an initiatory trip to Canada, the two girls, Rocío and Aldana, grow up, expressing through their bodies what their imagination reveals, their unique perspective and their unwavering resistance.

Primas had its international premiere at International Documentary Film Festival Amsterdam and was also selected at the Mar del Plata International Film Festival in Argentina and at the !f Istanbul Independent Film Festival, winning the international competition's Audience Award and the Love and Change Jury Award respectively.

The film was released in Canada in the fall of 2018.
