= BumRush =

- original movie poster
- Directed by: Michel Jetté
- Screenplay by: Michel Jette
- Produced by: Louise Sabourin; Michel Jetté
- Starring: Emmanuel Auger; Dara Lowe; Pat Lemaire; Jézabel Drolet; Bad News Brown
- Cinematography: Georges Archambault
- Edited by: Geoffroy Lauzon; Louise Sabourin
- Music by: Charles Papasoff
- Distributed by: Forban Films
- Release date: April 1, 2011
- Country: Canada
- Languages: French; English

BumRush is a 2011 Canadian film directed by Michel Jetté. BumRush is an independent film that was shot in Montreal in French and English and features Emmanuel Auger in the lead role of L'Kid and Bad News Brown in the role of gang leader Loosecanon. Musician and actor Bad News Brown was murdered soon after the film was shot. The film features some of his musical works. BumRush premiered on Canadian theaters on April 1, 2011.

== Plot ==
BumRush was inspired by real events that happened in Montreal. Bumrush refers to "storming into an establishment." After Montreal police conduct a series of raids against a criminal biker gang and the Italian Mafia, rival street gangs rush in to fill the void. The Kingdom, a bar, sees a new bloody chapter in the Quebec underworld, as the "IB 11" gang conducts a series of attacks on the bar that force the owner to hire five extraordinary men under the leadership of "L'Kid" to confront the gangs.

== Cast ==
- Emmanuel Auger - L'Kid
- Dara Lowe - Catherine
- Pat Lemaire - Papy
- Jézabel Drolet - Lou, Papy's sister
- Bad News Brown - Loosecanon, a senior in "IB 11" gang
- Robert Pace - Le Boss, head of "IB 11"
- Sylvain Beauchamp - Tank, L'Kid's guard
- Constant Gagné - Shrink
- Alain Nadro - Momo
- Paul Dion - Victor, police investigator
- Jacques Kartier - Bam Bam, senior in "IB 11"
- Giuseppe Giancaspro - "Brain" Martino, a senior in the Italian clan
- Carmine Napolitano - Tiny, "Brain"'s bodyguard
- Dj Cook - Mongol, member of NMB gang
- Jerry Guerrier - 8 Ball
- Louis-David Morasse - Buzz, senior in the bikers gang
- Sheilla Azmitia - Angy, Loosecanon's girlfriend
- Vandal Vyxen - Loli, 8 Ball's girlfriend
- Frost - Q
- Tchak - senior in "IB 11"
