= The Ultra Runner =

2026 Canadian documentary film

- Directed by: Mila Aung-Thwin
- Written by: Mila Aung-Thwin; Michael MacMillan
- Produced by: Bob Moore; Michael MacMillan
- Starring: Tiberiu Ușeriu
- Cinematography: Van Royko
- Edited by: Ryan Mullins
- Production company: EyeSteelFilm
- Release date: September 11, 2026 (TIFF)
- Running time: 98 minutes
- Country: Canada
- Languages: English; Romanian; Italian; German

The Ultra Runner is a Canadian documentary film, directed by Mila Aung-Thwin and released in 2026. The film is a portrait of Tiberiu Ușeriu, a Romanian man who spent time in prison in his youth due to his criminal history, before turning his life around to become a successful endurance runner.

The film premiered in the TIFF Docs program at the 2026 Toronto International Film Festival, where it was second runner-up for the People's Choice Award for Documentaries.
