= EyeSteelFilm =

Canadian film production company

EyeSteelFilm is a Montreal-based Canadian cinema production company co-founded by Daniel Cross and Mila Aung-Thwin, dedicated to socially engaged cinema, bringing social and political change through cinematic expression. Today the studio is run by co-presidents Mila Aung-Thwin and Bob Moore.

All three of the principals in the firm have been winners of the Don Haig Award for independent documentary film production from the Hot Docs Canadian International Documentary Festival, with Cross winning in 2017, Moore in 2020, and Aung-Thwin in 2022.

== Notable collective members ==
- Daniel Cross - producer and director
- Mila Aung-Thwin - producer and director
- Bob Moore - producer

Directors (past and present)

- Laura Bari - director
- Yung Chang - director
- Karina Garcia Casanova - director
- Eric "Roach" Denis - director
- Mia Donovan - director
- Lixin Fan - director
- Omar Majeed - director
- Peter Wintonick - director
- Ryan Mullins - director
- Brett Gaylor - director, interactive producer

== Films ==
Full feature documentary films

Date	Film	Director	Notes
1997	The Street: A Film with the Homeless	Daniel Cross	
2001	Too Colourful for the League	Daniel Cross and Mila Aung-Thwin	
2001	S.P.I.T.: Squeegee Punks in Traffic	Daniel Cross	
2001	Music for a Blue Train	Mila Aung-Thwin	
2002	Bone	Mila Aung-Thwin	
2003	RoachTrip	Eric "Roach" Denis	
2004	Inuuvunga: I Am Inuk, I Am Alive	Daniel Cross, Mila Aung-Thwin, Brett Gaylor and the students of Inukjuak - Innalik School	
2005	Chairman George	Daniel Cross and Mila Aung-Thwin	
2006	Punk the Vote!	Eric "Roach" Denis	Punk le vote!
2007	Up the Yangtze	Yung Chang	
2008	RiP!: A Remix Manifesto	Brett Gaylor	
2008	Antoine	Laura Bari	
2009	Taqwacore: The Birth of Punk Islam	Omar Majeed	
2009	Last Train Home	Lixin Fan	(simplified Chinese: 归途列车; traditional Chinese: 歸途列車) aka Guītú Lièchē / Gui tu lie che
2011	The Vanishing Spring Light	Xun Yu	
2011	Inside Lara Roxx	Mia Donovan	
2011	Fortunate Son	Tony Asimakopoulos	
2011	The Frog Princes	Ryan Mullins and Omar Majeed	
2012	China Heavyweight	Yung Chang	Chinese 千錘百煉
2012	The Fruit Hunters	Yung Chang	
2015	Family Demolition (La démolition familiale)	Patrick Damien-Roy	
2015	I Am the Blues	Daniel Cross	
2017	Let There Be Light	Mila Aung-Thwin and Van Royko	
2018	Anote's Ark	Matthieu Rytz	
2019	Wintopia	Mira Burt-Wintonick	
2023	Twice Colonized	Lin Alluna	
2024	Yintah	Jennifer Wickham, Brenda Michell, Michael Toledano	
2026	The Ultra Runner	Mila Aung-Thwin	
2026	The Sandbox	Kenya-Jade Pinto	

Short films

Date	Film	Director	Notes
2007	The Colony	Jeff Barnaby	Short film
2008	Ali Shan	Yung Chang	Short film
2010	Mokhtar	Halima Ouardiri	Short film

Films presently in progress include:

- Rainforest: The Limit of Spleandor (by Richard Boyce), Inkulal (by Linda Vastrik), Inventing the Future (by Daniel Cross), Jingle Bell Rocks! (by Mitchell Kezin), Just A Click Away (by Laura Turek), Les Tickets (by Eric "Roach" Denis), Such Great Heights (by Richard Boyce), Turcot (by Daniel Cross)

== Recognition ==
EyeSteelFilm has received numerous awards from international film festivals and annual television and film awards. EyeSteelFilm has collaborated with international broadcasters including Super Channel, PBS, CBC, National Geographic Channel, The History Channel, BBC, YLE, TV2 Denmark, ZDF ARTE, The Documentary Channel, SBS, etc. They have received support from the Canada Council for the Arts, SODEC, CALQ, and National Film Board of Canada.

- EyeSteelFilm is a RealScreen magazine Global 100 Company.
- Montreal Mirror arts weekly chose the firm as one of the "Noisemaker"s of 2007.
- EyeSteelFilm founder and president was one of five MIPDOC Trailblazers of 2008.
