= Last Train Home (film) =

- Theatrical release poster

Chinese name
- Traditional Chinese: 歸途列車
- Simplified Chinese: 归途列车
- Literal meaning: homeward train
Transcriptions
Standard Mandarin
- Hanyu Pinyin: guītú lièchē
- Directed by: Lixin Fan
- Produced by: Mila Aung-Thwin; Daniel Cross
- Starring: Yang Zhang; Changhua Zhang; Suqin Chen; Qin Zhang
- Cinematography: Lixin Fan
- Edited by: Mary Stephen, Lixin Fan
- Music by: Olivier Alary
- Production company: EyeSteelFilm
- Distributed by: Zeitgeist Films
- Release date: November 22, 2009 (IDFA)
- Running time: 85 minutes
- Country: Canada
- Language: Sichuanese Standard Chinese
- Box office: $288,328 (United States)

Last Train Home (Chinese: 归途列车) is a 2009 Canadian documentary film directed by Lixin Fan and produced by Daniel Cross and Mila Aung-Thwin of EyeSteelFilm. It won the Best Documentary Feature at 2009 IDFA and has been distributed by Zeitgeist Films in the US.

== Synopsis ==
Every spring, China's 130 million migrant workers travel back to their home villages for the Chinese New Year's holidays. This exodus called Chunyun is the world's largest human migration.

Working over several years, director Lixin Fan traveled with one couple who has embarked on these annual treks for almost two decades. Like many of China's rural poor, the Zhangs left their native village of Huilong, Daan Town, Guang'an District in Sichuan province and their newborn daughter to find work in Guangzhou in a garment factory for 16 years and see her only once a year during the Spring Festival. Their daughter Qin, now a restless and rebellious teenager, resents her parents' absence and longs for her own freedom away from school and her rural hometown, much to the dismay of her parents. She eventually leaves school, against the wishes of her parents, to work in the city.

== Developments since the film ==
In a March 2010 follow-up interview, director Lixin Fan reveals that the Zhangs are still working in the factory and Qin telephoned, but did not visit, for the New Year.

In September 2011, Fan said that Qin was now a vocational student in Beijing, and that while Qin's mother is back on the farm, her father still works at the factory.

In January 2012, an update on the family was released:

"We always kept contact with the family after we finished filming. The girl, she quit that job at the bar and went to find a new job. She's floating around. I knew she had a job at a hotel as a bartender and she went back to the factory for a small while and she came to study in a vocational school in Beijing last year for a few months, and then she quit again. Now she's working in a small city in Hubei. She's 22 now, so a big girl. She doesn't [get back for Spring Festival]. She still resents her parents very much. She thinks she never received any love from the parents, so she'll deliberately avoid them during Chinese New Year.

The little brother is now 16 years old. He was doing really great in school, he got really good marks. He's second-year in high school [Chinese high schools go three years]. He got a few No. 1s in the past few years. His parents were really happy.

Mother, she lost her job. She [technically] quit, but it's because of the financial crisis, [which] brought down the salaries so much. The factory usually doesn't fire you, it just drops the salary to a level that makes you quit by yourself. So she went back to the village to take care of the son. So now it's the father working alone in Guangzhou in the factory. So I think it's a really sad thing to see: by the end of this documentary, you see this family has been shattered into smaller pieces. Although the daughter did "succeed" in finding her own independence in the city."

== Awards ==
- 2009: Won Best Feature Documentary at the 22nd annual International Documentary Film Festival Amsterdam (IDFA)
- 2009: Won Cinémathèque Québécoise Best Quebec film award at the Rencontres internationales du documentaire de Montréal (RIDM)
- 2010: Won Best Documentary Feature Film award at Asia Pacific Screen Awards (APSA)
- 2010: Won Golden Gate Award in the Investigative Documentary Feature Category at the San Francisco International Film Festival (SFiFF)
- 2010: Official Selection at Sundance Film Festival
- 2010: Official Selection at New Directors/New Films Festival
- 2010: Won Best Documentary Feature at the RiverRun International Film Festival
- 2010: Won Grand Prix at EBS International Documentary Festival

The film won the Genie Award for Best Feature Length Documentary at the 31st Genie Awards in 2011.

== Reception ==
Last Train Home has a 100% rating on Rotten Tomatoes based on 54 reviews, earning the Golden Tomato award for best limited-release and best foreign film.

Manohla Dargis of the New York Times picked Last Train Home as one of the most outstanding works from the 2010 Sundance by characterizing it as "a beautifully shot, haunting and haunted large scale portrait".

Film critic Roger Ebert praised its depiction of conflict in one family as they struggle to improve their quality of life; giving the film four out of four. He concluded that due to the film's depiction of the effects of capitalism on the country that "[t]he rulers of China may someday regret that they distributed the works of Marx so generously".

Praising Last Train Home as "a documentary masterpiece", Brian Brooks of IndieWIRE wrote that "filmmaker Lixin Fan may very well be one of modern-day China's great non-fiction storytellers."

Critics of IndieWIRE placed Last Train Home at "top four" in its list of Top Ten Competition Films of the 2010 Sundance Film Festival.

Last Train Home was one of the top five films nominated for the Directors Guild of America Documentary Prize, announced on January 29, 2011, at the 63rd annual DGA Awards Dinner. It lost to Charles Ferguson's "Inside Job."

Lixin Fan was interviewed by Anna Maria Tremonti, host of CBC radio program "The Current", on January 19, 2011, talking about Last Train Home.

== Release ==
Last Train Home was released on American screens on September 3, 2010.

== See also ==
- 2009 in film
- List of Canadian films of 2009
- List of documentary films about the People's Republic of China
- List of films with a 100% rating on Rotten Tomatoes, a film review aggregator website
