= Tony Asimakopoulos =

Canadian film director

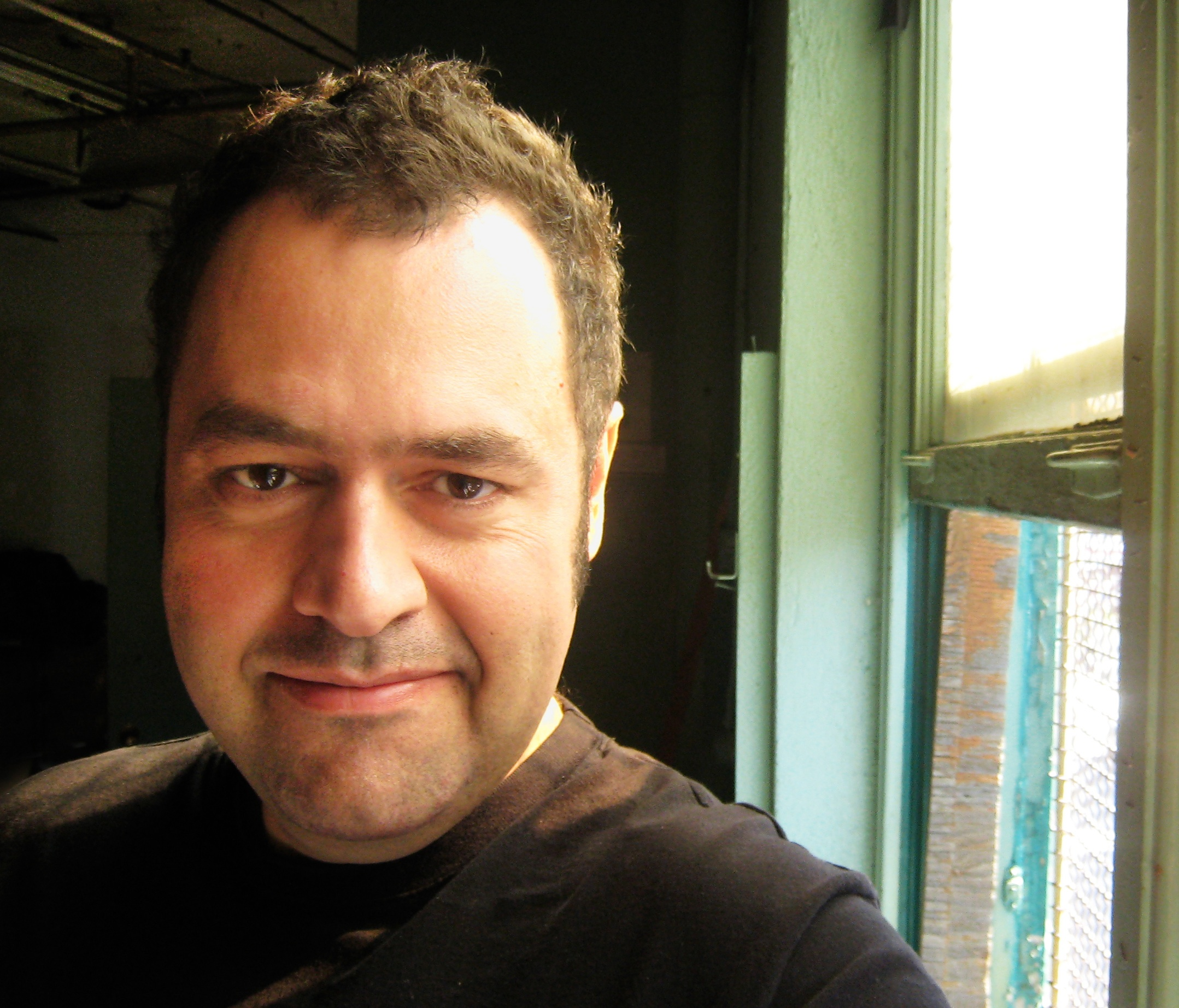
- Born: Antonios Asimakopoulos; Montreal, Quebec, Canada
- Occupation: Film director
- Years active: 1991–present

Tony Asimakopoulos is a Canadian film and television director based in Montreal. He often collaborates with the Montreal-based Canadian film production company EyeSteelFilm. He is best known for his autobiographical documentary Fortunate Son.

== Career ==
Tony Asimakopoulos was born and raised in Montreal to Greek immigrant parents, Aristomenis and Vassiliki Asimakopoulos. He studied at Montreal's Concordia University (BFA in film production,1993). His early shorts screened at the Toronto International Film Festival, Locarno, Gothenburg and Melbourne festivals.

He moved to Ontario in 1995 to enter treatment for drug addiction. While in Ontario he taught video production and mentored youth-at-risk, made experimental videos, and sat on the board of Ottawa's SAW Video Coop.

He resumed fiction work with Horsie's Retreat, a feature made at the Canadian Film Centre in 2004, then returned to Montreal to direct Canadian Case Files (serial TV docudrama), youtube comedy videos for CBC's Wiretap with Jonathan Goldstein, and began to make documentaries while caring for his aging parents.

His work as an editor includes the 2009 EyeSteelFilm documentary feature RiP!: A Remix Manifesto, and the 2011 autobiographical bilingual documentary film Fortunate Son being a candid look at his own family. Since then, he made the TV Doc Return To Park Ex and the fiction short Good Times Coming, and is currently traveling and writing.

== Filmography ==
Director

- 1991: Jimmy Fingers (short)
- 1992: Mama's Boy (short)
- 2005: Horsie's Retreat
- 2005: Canadian Case Files (TV series)
- 2011: Fortunate Son (documentary)
- 2014: A Xmas Memory (short fiction)
- 2017: Return To Park Ex / Retour À Parc-Ex (documentary)
- 2022: Good Times Coming (short fiction)

Cinematographer

- 2011: Fortunate Son (documentary)
- 2017: Return To Park Ex (documentary)

Screenwriter

- 2005: Horsie's Retreat
- 2022: Good Times Coming (short fiction)

Editor

- 1999: No One Believes the Professor (documentary short)
- 1999: Voices of Dissent: A Dance of Passion (documentary short)
- 2005: Horsie's Retreat (fiction feature)
- 2005: Canadian Case Files (TV series/docudrama)
- 2007: Imitation (fiction feature)
- 2007: Family Motel (fiction feature)
- 2009: RiP!: A Remix Manifesto (documentary feature)
- 2011: Fortunate Son (documentary feature)
- 2013: Come Worry With Us! (documentary feature)
- 2017: Return To Park Ex (documentary-TV hour)
- 2022: Good Times Coming (short fiction)
- 2023: Rule of Stone (documentary feature)
