= Olivier Alary =

French musician (born 1975)

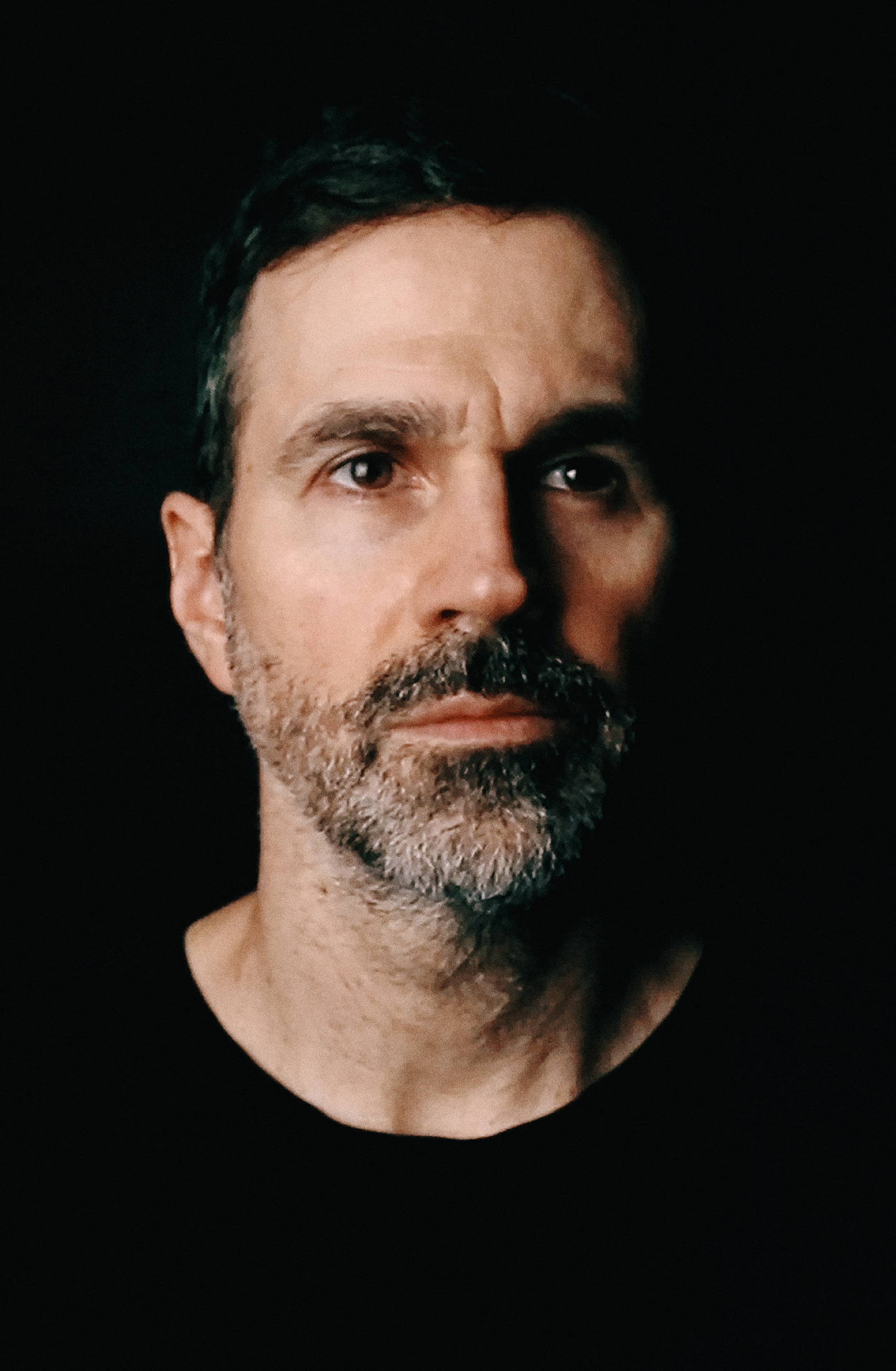

Background information
- Born: 1975 (age 49–50); France
- Occupations: Composer, producer
- Years active: 2000s–present
- Labels: Fat Cat Records
- Website: www.olivieralary.com

Olivier Alary is a Montreal-based musician and composer who has released his own recordings, as well as composing for film and exhibitions.

A native of Toulouse, France, and a former student of architecture, Alary created Ensemble in 1998 as a musical persona through which to explore the encounter between melodic noise and disjointed pop. He moved to London to study music and in 2000 he released his first album Sketch Proposals under the name Ensemble with Rephlex Records.

Sketch Proposals caught the attention of Björk, and Alary's remixes of three of her songs – "Sun in My Mouth", "Cocoon" and "Mouth's Cradle" – were released as B-sides. He went on to co-write the song "Desired Constellation" with Björk on her 2004 album Medúlla.

Alary's follow-up album, the self-titled Ensemble, blends symphonic wall-of-sound with intimate folk-pop vocals, and was released in 2006. It features vocal performances by Chan Marshall (of Cat Power fame), Lou Barlow and Mileece; drums by Adam Pierce; and orchestral arrangements by Johannes Malfatti, performed by Germany's Babelsberg Film Orchestra.

Ensemble's third album Excerpts was released in January 2011. A beautiful, sophisticated record of orchestrated pop songs on the theme of fictional and false memories, the album features collaborators Johannes Malfatti and vocalist Darcy Conroy.

Olivier has also composed music for several exhibitions at London's Victoria & Albert Museum; contributed to an installation by Doug Aitken at the Centre Georges Pompidou in Paris; and has received an honorary mention at the Ars Electronica Festival for his project Chlorgeschlecht. He has also collaborated with photographer Nick Knight. Since 2007, he has also provided soundtrack for several feature-length films and documentaries, some of which have received prestigious awards and screenings in Europe, the US and China.

== Discography ==
=== Albums ===
- Apparitions (Vol. 1) (as Olivier Alary) (LINE)
- u, i (as Olivier Alary; collaborative project with Johannes Malfatti) (130701)
- Fiction / Non-Fiction (as Olivier Alary) (130701)
- Pieces for Sine Wave Oscillators (as Olivier Alary) (LINE)
- Excerpts (as Ensemble) (FatCat Records)
- Ensemble (as Ensemble) (FatCat Records)
- Sketch Proposals (as Ensemble) (Rephlex Records)

=== Eps ===
- Envies d'Avalanches (FatCat Records)
- Disown, delete (FatCat Records)

=== Collaborations ===
- "Sun in My Mouth", recomposed by Ensemble, first Björk remix (Vespertine)
- "Cocoon retangled by Ensemble, second Björk remix (Vespertine)
- "Mouth's Cradle" recomposed by Ensemble, third Björk remix (Medúlla)
- "Desired Constellation" on Björk's album (Medúlla)
- "Chlorgeschlecht – Unyoga" (honorary mention at Ars Electronica)
- "I Bowed" and "Falling Away" with Derek Piotr, 2024

== Selected film soundtracks ==
- 2007: Up the Yangtze, documentary directed by Yung Chang
- 2008: The Dreaming, short fiction film directed by Anthony Green
- 2009: Last Train Home, documentary directed by Lixin Fan
- 2011: Jo for Jonathan (Jo pour Jonathan), fiction film directed by Maxime Giroux
- 2012: China Heavyweight, documentary directed by Yung Chang
- 2014: Felix and Meira, fiction film directed by Maxime Giroux
- 2014: Corbo, fiction film directed by Mathieu Denis
- 2014: Yo, fiction film directed by Matias Meyer
- 2014: Juanicas, documentary film directed by Karina Garcia Casanova
- 2015: Ville-Marie, fiction film directed by Guy Édoin
- 2016: Resurrecting Hassan, documentary directed by Carlo Guillermo Proto
- 2016: Oh What a Wonderful Feeling, short fiction film directed by François Jaros
- 2017: Allure, fiction film directed by Carlos and Jason Sanchez
- 2018: The Great Darkened Days, fiction film directed by Maxime Giroux
- 2018: First Match, fiction film directed by Olivia Newman
- 2019: A Brother's Love (La femme de mon frère), fiction film directed by Monia Chokri
- 2020: Night of the Kings, fiction film directed by Philippe Lacôte
- 2021: Perfecting the Art of Longing, documentary film directed by Kitra Cahana
- 2023: Twice Colonized, documentary film directed by Lin Alluna
- 2024: Yintah, documentary film directed by Jennifer Wickham, Brenda Michell and Michael Toledano
- 2024: Kidnapping Inc., fiction film directed by Bruno Mourral
- 2024: Measures for a Funeral, fiction film directed by Sofia Bohdanowicz
- 2025: The Cost of Heaven (Gagne ton ciel), fiction film directed by Mathieu Denis
