= Ash Thorp =

American film director

- Born: Ashley Livingston Thorp; March 1983 (age 43) in Oceanside, San Diego County, California, United States
- Occupations: Illustrator, graphic designer, creative director

Ashley Livingston Thorp (born March 1983) is an American illustrator, graphic designer, and creative director for feature films, commercial marketing, and print.

== Career ==
As a freelance graphic designer, Thorp created UI (user interface) graphics and design content for Total Recall and Ender's Game. He also contributed to the direction and concepts for Prometheus, X-Men: First Class, The Amazing Spider-Man 2, along with many other feature films.

In 2013, Thorp launched his own creative design corporation named ALT Creative, Inc. and serves as President of the firm.

Thorp also founded and hosts The Collective Podcast. He created the podcast to connect and share experiences with creatives from all realms of media, including visual effects artists, designers, illustrators, and programmers.

Thorp elevated his career from designer to creative director. His first directorial debut in 2014 involved a Ghost in the Shell tribute titled Project 2501. Soon thereafter, he wrote and directed the main title for OFFF Barcelona 2014 alongside director Anthony Scott Burns. In 2015, he assembled an international team of designers and created the title sequence for FITC Tokyo, which was selected as a Vimeo staff pick.

Most recently, Thorp created a graphic series titled Lost Boy, which is in further development alongside his co-director, Anthony Scott Burns. PostPanic Pictures announced that they will be producing a concept short for Lost Boy with an aimed release date in 2016.

For the 2022 film The Batman Thorp designed the Batmobile as well the Batcycle under the lead of the film's production designer James Chinlund.

His most recent film Chimera with actor Tyler Hynes was a great success and went viral shortly after its release.
