= Van Royko =

Van Royko is a Canadian cinematographer and filmmaker from Montreal, Quebec. He is most noted as a two-time Canadian Screen Award nominee, receiving nods for Best Cinematography in a Documentary at the 5th Canadian Screen Awards in 2017 for Koneline: Our Land Beautiful, and Best Photography in a Documentary Program or Factual Series at the 6th Canadian Screen Awards in 2018 for Interrupt This Program.

As a filmmaker he was co-director with Mila Aung-Thwin of the documentary films The Vote and Let There Be Light, and with Marie-Philippe Gilbert of the short documentary film Quiet Time. In 2020 he was one of the creators of Anthologie 2020, a short documentary "chain letter" film about the COVID-19 pandemic in Quebec which was screened at the 2021 Festival du nouveau cinéma. He also directed episodes of Interrupt This Program and Art Is My Country.

His other credits as a cinematographer have included the films Monsoon, The Fall of the American Empire (La chute de l'empire américain), The Death Tour, Saigon Story: Two Shootings in the Forest Kingdom, and The Ultra Runner.

Alongside Nicolas Bolduc, Erik Ljung, Tobie Marier Robitaille, Sara Mishara, Alexia Toman and André Turpin, he won a Gémeaux Award for Best Photography in a Documentary or Public Affairs program in 2024 for Lac-Mégantic: This Is Not an Accident (Lac-Mégantic : ceci n’est pas un accident).
