= This Is Not a Movie (2019 film) =

- Film poster
- Directed by: Yung Chang
- Written by: Yung Chang; Nelofer Pazira
- Produced by: Anita Lee; Allyson Luchak; Nelofer Pazira; Ingmar Trost
- Starring: Robert Fisk
- Cinematography: Duraid Munajim
- Edited by: Mike Munn
- Music by: Justin Small; Ohad Benchetrit
- Production company: National Film Board of Canada
- Distributed by: Blue Ice Docs
- Release date: September 9, 2019 (TIFF)
- Running time: 106 minutes
- Country: Canada
- Language: English

This Is Not a Movie is a Canadian documentary film, directed by Yung Chang and released in 2019. The film profiles the career of Robert Fisk, the influential British war correspondent.

The film premiered at the 2019 Toronto International Film Festival. In 2020, with its commercial distribution plan disrupted by the COVID-19 pandemic in Canada, Blue Ice Docs made the film available for online streaming rental in conjunction with a number of film festivals and independent theatres, including the Hot Docs Canadian International Documentary Festival, the Cinéfest Sudbury International Film Festival, the Reel Shorts Film Festival and the Kelowna Rotary Centre for the Arts.
