= Too Colourful for the League =

2001 film by Mila Aung-Thwin, Daniel Cross

- Directed by: Daniel Cross; Mila Aung-Thwin
- Written by: Max Wallace
- Produced by: Diversus Productions; Ari Cohen; Evan Beloff; Max Wallace; Daniel Cross
- Release date: 2001
- Running time: 52 minutes
- Country: Canada
- Language: English

Too Colourful for the League is a 52-minute 2001 Canadian documentary film made for CBC-TV, directed by Daniel Cross and Mila Aung-Thwin and produced by Diversus Productions. The film was produced by Evan Beloff, Ari Cohen and Max Wallace, who were nominated for a Gemini Award for best documentary. It was written by Max Wallace and co-produced by Daniel Cross.

The documentary examines the struggle of blacks in hockey in Canada from the 1930s to the present day, telling the story of black players' courage and determination to play in a white-dominated sport. It focuses on an effort by former Montreal citizenship judge Richard Lord to nominate legendary black hockey player Herb Carnegie into the Hockey Hall of Fame. During the 1940s, Carnegie was widely acknowledged as one of the best hockey players in the world, playing alongside Jean Béliveau for the Quebec Aces. Yet he was never allowed to play in the NHL because of a long-time color barrier, which was only broken a decade later by Willie O'Ree of the Boston Bruins. In the film, veteran Hockey Hall of Fame referee Red Storey recalls watching Carnegie try out for Toronto Maple Leafs owner Conn Smythe. According to Storey, Smythe turned to him and said, "I'd give $10,000 to turn that boy white."

The documentary was broadcast by CBC, CTV, CBC Newsworld and Canal Plus.

== See also ==
- List of black ice hockey players
