= Antoine (film) =

- Theatrical release poster
- Directed by: Laura Bari
- Written by: Laura Bari
- Produced by: Laura Bari
- Starring: Antoine Houang
- Cinematography: Laura Bari
- Edited by: Sophie Farkas Bolla
- Music by: Ramachandra Borcar
- Distributed by: EyeSteelFilm; Atopia
- Release date: November 15, 2008 (Rencontres Internationales du Documentaire de Montréal)
- Running time: 82 minutes
- Country: Canada
- Language: French

Antoine is a 2008 Canadian documentary film directed by Laura Bari. The film features a 5-year old blind boy named Antoine Houang, living in Montreal, Quebec. It tells the real and imaginary life of Antoine, a boy detective who runs, drives, makes decisions, hosts radio shows and adores simultaneous telephone conversations. Over the course of two years, he uses a mini-boom microphone to discover and capture the sounds surrounding him. In this manner he also co-created the soundtrack of the film.

== Synopsis ==
The film opens with a shot of a five-year-old using a braille typewriter to describe in great detail how he became blind at birth. The next scene is Antoine receiving a phone call from Madame Rouski, who dissolved into the water while taking a shower. Antoine's mission is to find Madame Rouski. Equipped with his two best friends and a mini boom microphone to help him find clues, Antoine spends two years of his life locating her. Is she in the yellow daffodils, in the air, in Vietnam, or has she turned into a monster?

== Festivals ==
- Thessaloniki Documentary Festival, Greece (March 2009)
- Tribeca Film Festival, New York, USA (April 2009)
- EBS International Documentary Festival, Seoul, South Korea (Septembre 2009)
- Reykjavík International Film Festival, Iceland (September 2009)
- Vancouver International Film Festival, Vancouver, British Columbia, Canada (October 2009)
- San Diego Asian Film Festival, San Diego, USA (October 2009)
- DOK Leipzig, Germany (November 2009)
- Sheffield Doc/Fest, Sheffield, United Kingdom (November 2009)
- Mar del Plata Film Festival, Argentina (November 2009)
- Gothenburg Film Festival, Sweden (February 2010)

== Awards ==
- Special jury mention in the "doctape award" category Rencontres internationales du documentaire de Montreal (RIDM), Montreal, (November 2008)
- Lindalee Tracey Award, Hot Docs, Toronto (May 2009)
- First Special Jury Prize, for Emotions Pictures, Athens, Greece (June 2009)
- Honor Prize for Best Experimental Documentary, Docupolis, Barcelona (September 2009)
