= RIP!: A Remix Manifesto =

RiP!: A Remix Manifesto
- Directed by: Brett Gaylor
- Written by: Brett Gaylor
- Produced by: Mila Aung-Thwin, Kat Baulu, Germaine Ying Gee Wong
- Starring: Girl Talk; Lawrence Lessig; Cory Doctorow; Gilberto Gil
- Cinematography: Mark Ellam
- Edited by: Brett Gaylor; Tony Asimakopoulos
- Music by: Olivier Alary
- Production companies: National Film Board of Canada; EyeSteelFilm
- Distributed by: Documentary; Canal D B-Side Entertainment
- Release date: November 2008
- Running time: 86 minutes
- Country: Canada
- Language: English

RiP!: A Remix Manifesto is a 2008 open-source documentary film about "the changing concept of copyright" directed by Brett Gaylor.

Created over a period of six years, the documentary film features the collaborative remix work of hundreds of people who have contributed to the Open Source Cinema website, helping to create the "world's first open source documentary" as Gaylor put it. The project's working title was Basement Tapes, (referring to the album of the same name) but it was renamed RiP!: A Remix Manifesto prior to theatrical release. Gaylor encourages more people to create their own remixes from this movie, using media available from the Open Source Cinema website, or other websites like YouTube, Flickr, Hulu, or MySpace.

== Background ==
Gaylor traveled the world to find like-minded people who would help him draft the "Remixer's Manifesto" that makes up the structure of his open source documentary. The manifesto reads as follows:

1. Culture always builds on the past.
2. The past always tries to control the future.
3. Our future is becoming less free.
4. To build free societies you must limit the control of the past

— Brett Gaylor in Rip! A Remix Manifesto

To further his point, Gaylor separates the corporations from the public domain, defining the former using so-called "CopyRIGHT," and the latter, which represents the free exchange of ideas, as "CopyLEFT." Gaylor and Gillis are clearly on the side of the Copyleft, promoting the free flow and growth of creativity and ideas. To enable a free remixing culture also with his film, he released RiP! under the CC BY-NC-SA 3.0 Creative Commons license.

== Participants ==
The documentary is particularly interested in the legal grey area of remixing existing works. The film features appearances by:

- Gregg Gillis (better known as Girl Talk) an American musician specializing in mashup-style remixes, which often use a dozen or more unauthorized samples from different songs to create an entirely new track. Gillis' 2006 album Night Ripper had potentially 300 copyright infringements and carried a maximum financial liability penalty of around $45 million. To some he is considered a creative rebel of a mash-up artist, while others deem his work pure copyright infringement.
- Lawrence Lessig, an American academic and political activist, and a professor of law at Harvard Law School and founder of the Center for Internet and Society. He is best known as a proponent of reduced legal restrictions on copyright, trademark, and radio frequency spectrum, particularly in technology applications. He was previously a professor of law at Stanford Law School. Gaylor discusses the legal protection of fair use with Lessig to determine the ability to produce the film.
- Cory Doctorow, a Canadian blogger, journalist and science fiction author. Doctorow is co-editor of the blog Boing Boing and is an activist in favor of reforming copyright laws. He is a proponent of the Creative Commons organization, using some of their licenses for his books. Common themes in his work include digital rights management and file sharing. In the film, Doctorow states, "Technology giveth, technology taketh away."
- Gilberto Gil, the Brazilian musician and former Minister of Cultural Affairs who initiated pioneering programs in Brazil through a partnership with Creative Commons. As Minister, he sponsored a program called Culture Points, which gives grants to provide music technology and education to people living in poor areas of the country's cities.
- Dan O'Neill, an underground cartoonist and founder of the Air Pirates, a group which was famously sued by The Walt Disney Company for copyright infringement.
- Jammie Thomas, the single mom successfully sued by the Recording Industry Association of America (RIAA) at the Capitol v. Thomas case for Thomas' illegal downloading. The single mother, who made US$36,000 a year, was ordered to pay US$222,220 in damages for making 24 songs available for download on the Kazaa file sharing network.

== Festivals and awards ==
RiP!: A Remix Manifesto made its international debut at the IDFA (International Documentary Film Festival Amsterdam) in November 2008. It won the festival's Audience Award.

The film made its US debut at the South by Southwest festival on 15 March 2009.

The Canadian news-magazine Maclean's called the movie as "a dazzling frontal assault on how corporate culture is using copyright law to muzzle freedom of expression."

Showing at the Whistler Film Festival, that took place 4 to 7 December 2008, it won the Cadillac People's Choice Award. It also received the Audience Choice award at the Ann Arbor Film Festival.

At the Festival du Nouveau Cinéma in Montreal it won the Special Jury Prize. It was the closing film at Docs Barcelona. It was an honorable mention at the EBS film festival (Korea). It was the opening film of the Ambulante Film Festival (Mexico City). It was a Selection at the South by Southwest Film Festival, at Les Rendez-vous du cinéma québécois, the Adelaide Film Festival, Thessaloniki Film Festival, Silverdocs, Nashville Film Festival, Victoria International Film Festival, Yamagata International Documentary Festival, Planete Doc (Poland), Available Light Film Festival, Buenos Aires Film Festival, Sheffield Doc/Fest and the Munich Dokfest, the New Zealand International Film Festivals, Guth Gaga Film Festival (Ireland), and the International Film Festival of Rio.

The film was in the running for Best Feature Length Documentary in the 30th Annual Genie Awards in Canada.

== Broadcast ==
Documentary (Canada), Documentary Channel (USA), NHK (Japan), SBS (Australia), YLE (Finland), NRK (Norway), EBS (Korea), Canal D – Quebec, Yes – Israel, VPRO – Netherlands, TV3 – Catalonia, TVP Cultura – Poland, Globo – Brazil, Cult – Italy, Planete - France, iSat – Argentina + South America

== Reception ==
Many of the reviewers on the review aggregator Rotten Tomatoes struggled with the director's point of film and the film received a 42% approval rating from critics there, based on 12 reviews. Audiences were more mixed, giving the film a 75% approval rating from 250 reviews.

== RiP!: A Remix Manifesto 2.0 ==
On 27 February 2009 Brett Gaylor started a new project on his site, Open Source Cinema, dubbed RiP!: A Remix Manifesto 2.0. With this project, he invited users to take the original documentary, remix it, and upload their contributions to be included in a new, improved version of the film. 2.0 was screened at the SilverDocs film festival.

== See also ==
- Open source movement
- Good Copy Bad Copy
- Piracy is theft
- Steal This Film
- The Internet's Own Boy
- The Pirate Bay Away From Keyboard
