= Laura Bari =

Argentine-Canadian film director

Laura Bari is an Argentinian born and Montréal, Canada based filmmaker, author and educator. She studied pedagogy at Université du Québec à Montréal, specializing in psychopathology of the expression in the early 1990s before directing a series of three acclaimed feature documentaries at the turn of the millennium and publishing a first book of poems in 2025.

Her debut feature film, Antoine (2008), is a documentary about a 5-year old blind boy living in Montréal, Québec, Canada. Antoine is a daring, poetic, and playful docufiction that intimately explores the life of a brilliant and unique blind boy who is fully integrated into the regular school system. The film is a homage to human resilience, optimism, and creativity. Antoine was screened in over 30 international film festivals including Tribeca Film Festival in NYC, Hot Docs in Canada, Dok Leipzig in Germany, Sheffield Doc/Fest in England, Mar del Plata International Film Festival in Argentina and IDFA in Holland. Ariel (2013), Bari's second opus, is a feature documentary about a double amputee who sets out to rebuild his broken identity. Her latest film, Primas (2017), a portrait of two Argentinian teenagers who, in the wake of heinous acts that interrupted their childhoods, free themselves from the shadows of the past, premiered at the 2017 International Documentary Film Festival Amsterdam and was theatrically released in several countries in 2018. In 2022, she began producing a series of twelve filmed poetic essays titled Si, docecalogue, whose first chapter was selected for the Thessaloniki International Film Festival and the FIFA – International Festival of Films on Art in Montréal in 2024.

In 2025, she published her first book of poems in French, Le corps est une maison sans grands-parents, in which a narrator returns to a fading house in an Argentine village and revisits childhood memories shaped by the country’s long dictatorship, as the boundaries between body and house, past voices and memory dissolve, transforming the dying home into a vessel of survival and transcendence.

Since 1995, Laura Bari teaches early childhood education at Cégep du Vieux Montréal. Between 1999 and 2002, she had also directed and hosted over 300 documentary vignettes for a popular Québec educational children's television series entitled Cornemuse. In many of her works, Bari combines education and art particularly as it relates to children education.
