= S.P.I.T.: Squeegee Punks in Traffic =

2001 film

- DVD Cover of S.P.I.T.
- Directed by: Daniel Cross
- Produced by: Daniel Cross; Mila Aung-Thwin; Pascal Maeder
- Starring: Eric "Roach" Denis
- Cinematography: Mila Aung-Thwin
- Distributed by: Atopia, and EyeSteelFilm
- Release date: 2001
- Running time: 80 minutes
- Country: Canada
- Languages: English, and French subtitles

S.P.I.T.: Squeegee Punks in Traffic is a Canadian 2001 documentary film by Daniel Cross. The narrative unfolds from the point of view of squeegee kids.

The main character, "Roach," later on became an EyeSteelFilm documentary director as Eric "Roach" Denis.

== Reception ==
A very positive review in TV guide stated, "not only does the film play an activist role in terms of engendering audience awareness, it also made a concrete difference in the life of one individual who was in critical need of external help - putting it in the rare category of such documentary predecessors as Joe Berlinger and Bruce Sinofsky's Paradise Lost trilogy and Errol Morris's The Thin Blue Line."

The Canadian website Mediafilm praised the acting and editing.
