= Mila Aung-Thwin =

Canadian documentary filmmaker, producer and activist

- Aung-Thwin in 2026

Mila Aung-Thwin is a Canadian documentary filmmaker, producer and activist whose films deal with social justice.

He had a multi-disciplinary education in arts, journalism, and photography. In 1998, he met his fellow director/producer Daniel Cross and co-founded with him EyeSteelFilm specializing in making documentaries. He is the vice-president of the company.

He is a graduate of Vanier College and McGill University in 1998. He was an editor of the McGill Daily during his studies.

== Career ==
Aung-Thwin, an award-winning director made the films Chairman George on the stations CTV, BBC's Storyville and TV 2 (Denmark). as a co-director to Daniel Cross. Another co-direction with Cross was Too Colourful for the League, Gemini-nominated TV documentary examining the struggle of blacks in ice hockey from the 1930s to the present day telling the story of black players' courage and determination to play in a white-dominated sport.

To his credit as sole director are the documentary Bone that follows Montreal's Snell Thouin Project with the extraordinary talents of Willy Tsao's Beijing Modern Dance Company, Music for a Blue Train, a documentary about the beauty and hardship of playing music for commuter traffic focussing on Montreal's subway system, The Métro, that has 59 designated spots for musicians to perform for the public and finally Inuuvunga: I Am Inuk, I Am Alive co-directed with fellow EyeSteelFilm directors Daniel Cross, Brett Gaylor and the students of Inukjuak - Innalik School.

He served as cinematographer / producer on S.P.I.T.: Squeegee Punks in Traffic, a theatrically released film about a squeegee punk named Roach. He also produced RoachTrip as a follow-up to S.P.I.T.. As director, he won the Golden Sheaf Award at the Yorkton Film Festival in 2006 and as producer, he won a Genie Award for Up the Yangtze in 2009. In 2008 he was executive producer for Antoine. In 2009 he produced RiP!: A Remix Manifesto (producer) and Taqwacore: The Birth of Punk Islam.

In 2022 he was named the winner of the Don Haig Award at the Hot Docs Canadian International Documentary Festival.

== Filmography ==
=== Director ===
- 2001: Too Colourful for the League
- 2003: Music for a Blue Train
- 2005: Chairman George
- 2005: Bone
- 2017: Let There Be Light (co-director with Van Royko)
- 2026: The Ultra Runner

=== Producer ===
- 2001: S.P.I.T.: Squeegee Punks in Traffic (producer)
- 2005: Chairman George (co-producer)
- 2005: Bone (producer)
- 2007: The Colony (executive producer)
- 2007: Up the Yangtze (producer) (Chinese: 沿江而上)
- 2008: Antoine (executive producer)
- 2009: RiP!: A Remix Manifesto (producer)
- 2009: Ali Shan (executive producer)
- 2009: Taqwacore: The Birth of Punk Islam (producer)
- 2009: Last Train Home (producer) aka Gui tu lie che / (simplified Chinese: 归途列车; traditional Chinese: 歸途列車)
- 2010: The Frog Princes (executive producer)
- 2010: "Gambling Boys" (for The Passionate Eye on Canadian Broadcasting Corporation (CBC) - a TV series documentary) (executive producer)
- 2010: Mokhtar (producer) (short)
- 2011: Inside Lara Roxx (executive producer, producer)
- 2011: Fortunate Son (producer)
- 2012: China Heavyweight (executive producer) (Chinese: 千錘百煉)
- 2016: I Am the Blues
- 2017: Let There Be Light (co-producer)
- 2022: Midwives

=== Cinematographer ===
- 2001: S.P.I.T.: Squeegee Punks in Traffic
- 2005: Chairman George
- 2005: Bone

=== Editor ===
- 2005: Chairman George
- 2005: Bone
- 2017: Let There Be Light (co-editor)
- 2018: Anote's Ark
- 2022: Midwives

== Awards ==
- In 2006, he won the Golden Sheaf Award at Yorkton Short Film and Video Festival for Chairman George alongside Daniel Cross
- In 2009, he won Genie Award for "Best Documentary" for Up the Yangtze jointly with Yung Chang, John Christou and Germaine Wong

== See also ==
- EyeSteelFilm
