= The Street: A Film with the Homeless =

- Directed by: Daniel Cross
- Produced by: Daniel Cross; Don Haig
- Release date: 1997
- Running time: 78 minutes
- Country: Canada
- Language: English

The Street: A Film with the Homeless is a 78-minute 1997 documentary film about the homeless in Montreal, Quebec, Canada. The film was directed by Daniel Cross and produced by him and Don Haig. The production houses were the National Film Board of Canada and Necessary Illusions Productions Inc.

Made over 6 years, "The Street" is the result of the filmmakers' total immersion into the world of the homeless. It is a study of 3 homeless Montrealers who can be seen mostly near the city's Guy–Concordia metro station of Société de transport de Montréal (STM).

Characters experience cycles of addiction and recovery, hope and despair, while remaining in the street environment. Set against a backdrop of declining social services and civil institutions, "The Street" addresses social issues.

== Synopsis ==
For six years, director Daniel Cross followed the lives of brothers Danny and John Claven and Frank O'Malley—three homeless men who spent much of their time in and around a Montreal subway station. Cross became intimately involved with the three men's lives, chronicling the evolution of their years on the street, and their cycles of addiction and recovery, hope and despair. The Street was filmed in a cinema verité style. The Street was the winner of a Special Jury Award for Documentaries at the Vancouver International Film Festival in 1996 and the People's Choice Award at the 1997 Canadian International Documentary Film Awards in Toronto.

== Festivals and awards ==
The documentary won the following awards:

- Federal Express People's Choice Awards for Most Popular Canadian Documentary & Special Jury Feature Award for Documentaries, both at the Vancouver International Film Festival, 1996
- Best Social Documentary at Vermont International Film Festival
- Silver Hugo Award at the Chicago Film Festival, Chicago, IL, 1998
- People's Choice Award as Most Popular Film & Nomination for "Best Feature," Hot Docs

It was nominated for "Outstanding Canadian Documentary," at the Joan C. Chalmers Awards 1997. It was in the Feature Competition at Mumbai International Film Festival, India. It was selected for screening at various other film festivals including International Documentary Festival, Message to Man Film Festival at St. Petersburg, Russia, Galway Film Fleadh and the Cork Film Festival in Ireland, the Buenos Aires International Festival of Independent Films in Argentina, Internationales Dokumentarfilmfestival in Munich, Germany and the Atlantic Film Festival, Halifax, Nova Scotia in Canada
