= Lixin Fan =

Chinese-born Canadian documentary film director

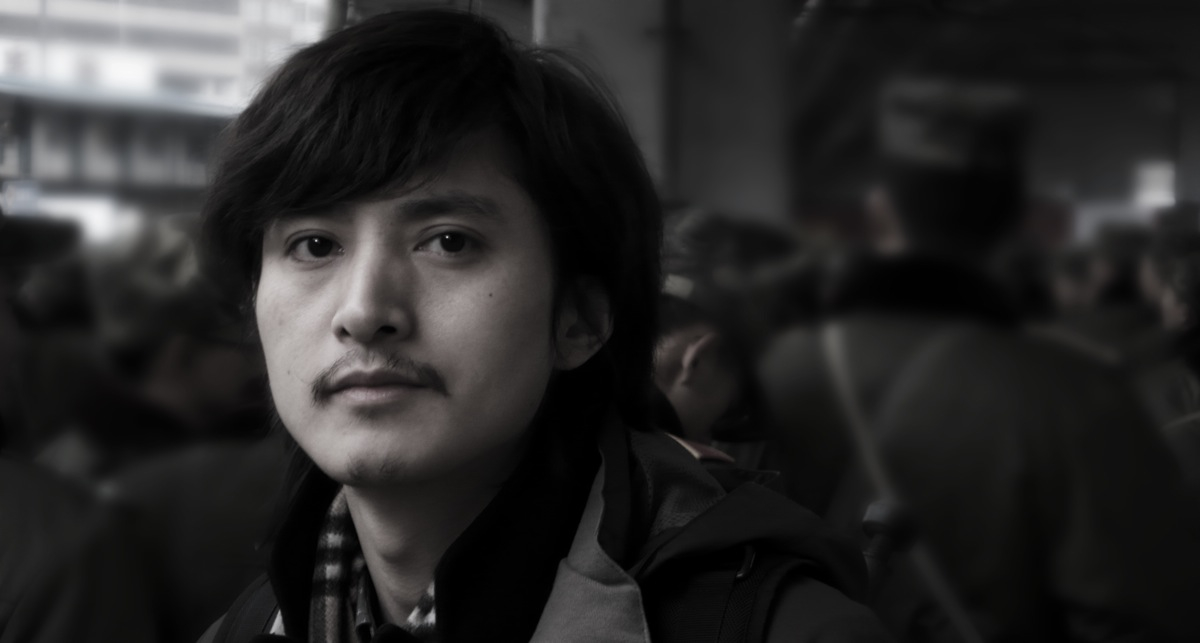
Lixin Fan in 2009

Lixin Fan (範立欣, Fàn Lìxīn; born March 1977, Wuhan, Hubei, China,) is a Montreal, Quebec, Canada-based documentary film director with the Canadian production company EyeSteelFilm and previously a producer/journalist at China's state broadcaster CCTV.

== Early life and career ==
Lixin Fan was born and raised in Wuhan and attended the Huazhong University of Science and Engineering, graduating with a degree in English at the age of twenty-one. during its years of rapid economic development. He began his career as a journalist with the government owned national TV broadcaster China Central Television (CCTV). While traveling the country Fan witnessed social and economic inequalities spurred by China's rapid economic expansion. As a result, he became a documentary filmmaker with a focus on social issues.

Lixin was editor of the 2002 film To Live Is Better Than To Die about China's AIDS crisis which was featured in the Sundance Film Festival and broadcast on BBC, CBC and PBS.

He also worked as an associate producer, sound recordist, and translator on the acclaimed 2007 feature documentary Up the Yangtze.

His 2009 debut feature documentary film Last Train Home won several awards in the category of documentary filmmaking.

== Awards ==
- 2009: Won Best Feature Documentary at the 22nd annual International Documentary Film Festival Amsterdam (IDFA) for his debut film Last Train Home
- 2009: Won Cinémathèque Québécoise Best Quebec film award at the Rencontres internationales du documentaire de Montréal (RIDM) also for Last Train Home
