= Yung Chang =

Chinese Canadian film director

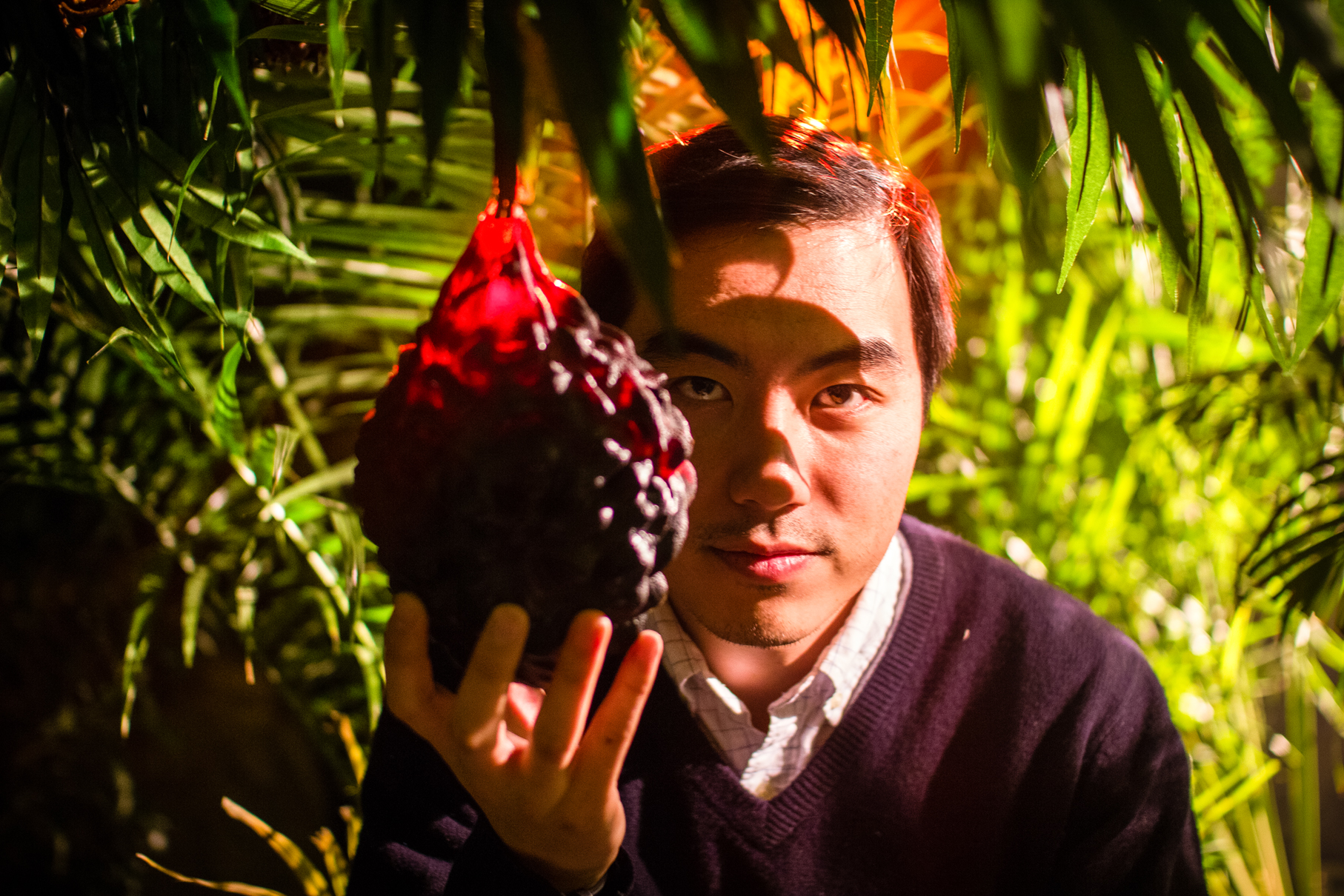
- Education: Concordia University
- Occupation: Film director
- Years active: 2002–present

Chinese name
- Traditional Chinese: 張僑勇
- Simplified Chinese: 张侨勇
- Hanyu Pinyin: Zhāng Qiáoyǒng

Yung Chang is a Chinese Canadian film director and was part of the collective member directors of Canadian film production firm EyeSteelFilm.

Chang is a graduate of Concordia University's Mel Hoppenheim School of Cinema in Montreal, the Neighbourhood Playhouse School of the Theatre (2003), the Canadian Film Center (2009), and the Directors and Screenwriters Lab at the Sundance Institute (2015). He was invited to join the Academy of Motion Picture Arts and Sciences in 2013 and is currently an active member.

== Early life ==
Chang grew up in Whitby, Ontario as one of the few children of color. He was later sent to boarding school at Upper Canada College.

== Career ==
=== Documentary ===
Chang released the medium length documentary, Earth to Mouth, in 2002 with the National Film Board of Canada. It revolves around migrant Mexican worker working on a Chinese operated farm in south-east Ontario.

Chang released his first feature-length documentary, Up the Yangtze, in 2007. The film highlights the repercussions of building the Three Gorges Dam and the economic effect on rural families. It was one of the top-grossing documentary box office releases in 2008 and garnered numerous awards, including the 2008 Golden Horse Award for Best Documentary.

Chang released his sophomore film, China Heavyweight, in 2012. It is about a boxing coach and his two students in rural China fighting to become amateur and professional champions. The film premiered at Sundance 2012 in the World Documentary competition. Like its predecessor, China Heavyweight also won the Golden Horse Award for Best Documentary in 2012.

In the same year, Chang also completed The Fruit Hunters, a feature documentary about exotic fruit cultivators, preservationists, and the history of fruits. The Fruit Hunters premiered at the International Documentary Festival (IDFA) in Amsterdam and the Berlinale Film Festival in 2013. It won the Best Film award at the 2013 Environmental Film Festival in Paris.

He was invited to join the Academy of Motion Picture Arts and Sciences in 2013 and is currently an active member.

His documentary short, Gatekeeper, was released in 2016 and is streaming on Field of Vision, Laura Poitras' curated online film unit. It centers around retired police officer, Yukio Shige, and his work on preventing suicides around Tōjinbō, an infamous location for suicides in Japan. Gatekeeper won Best Short Documentary at the LA Film Festival in 2016, qualifying for the Oscars.

This is Not a Movie, his feature documentary about prolific Middle East correspondent, Robert Fisk, had its world premiere at the 2019 Toronto International Film Festival. It was co-produced by the National Film Board of Canada and is distributed in the USA by KimStim Films.

Chang released Pandemic19 co-directed with his wife, Annie Katsura Rollins, executive produced by Jean Tsien, edited by Xi Feng and lensed by Derek Howard. The film won two awards at the 2020 Hot Springs Documentary Film Festival for Best Documentary Short Special Jury Mention and the Matt DeCample Audience Choice Award Short. The jury wrote: "PANDEMIC19 is a poignant document of the factual and emotional details of Covid-19 as seen through the eyes of three American frontline doctors. Smartly utilizing the doctors own video testimonials, this film feels alive and immediate while we remain so disconnected."

=== Narrative ===
Chang wrote the neo-noir romantic screenplay for Eggplant《茄子》, his first narrative feature, about a wedding photographer's happenstance encounter with his swindler ex-girlfriend. The project was selected to participate in the Sundance Institute Director and Screenwriters Lab in 2015.

=== Influences ===
Chang is a fan of cinéma vérité, taking influences from films released by the National Film Board of Canada in the 1950s and 1960s, such as Lonely Boy (film), and Allan King's "actuality drama" filmography.

== Filmography ==
=== Director ===
- 2002: The Fish Market (short)
- 2003: Earth to Mouth (short documentary)
- 2007: Up the Yangtze (full-length documentary)
- 2009: Ali Shan (short)
- 2012: China Heavyweight (full-length documentary)
- 2012: The Fruit Hunters (full-length documentary)
- 2016: Gatekeeper (documentary)
- 2017: Eggplant (script)
- 2019: Omega Man: A Wrestling Love Story (documentary)
- 2019: This Is Not a Movie (documentary)
- 2021: Wuhan Wuhan (documentary)

=== Screenwriter ===
- 2002: The Fish Market (short)
- 2007: Up the Yangtze
- 2009: Ali Shan (short)
- 2012: China Heavyweight
- 2012: The Fruit Hunters
- 2016: Gatekeeper (short)
- 2017: Eggplant (script)

== Screenings and awards ==
Yung Chang is also the recipient of the 2008 Yolande and Pierre Perrault award for most promising filmmaker at the 2008 Rendez-vous du cinema québecois; received the 2008 Don Haig Award at Hot Docs; and the Charles Guggenheim Emerging Artist Award at Full Frame Documentary Film Festival in North Carolina.

| Festival | Award | Date |
|---|---|---|
| Genie Awards | Best Documentary | 2009 |
| Golden Horse Film Festival and Awards | Best Documentary | 2008 |
| Sundance Film Festival | Official Selection | 2008 |
| Vancouver International Film Festival | Best Canadian Documentary | 2008 |
| San Francisco International Film Festival | Best Feature Documentary | 2008 |
| Independent Spirit Awards | Best Documentary | 2009 |
| Golden Horse Film Festival and Awards | Best Documentary | 2012 |
| Sundance Film Festival | Official Selection | 2012 |
| Milano Film Festival | Best Film | 2012 |
| Festival international du film d'environnement de Paris | Grand Prize for Best Film | 2013 |
