= Up the Yangtze =

- the film's poster
- Directed by: Yung Chang
- Written by: Yung Chang
- Produced by: Mila Aung-Thwin; Germaine Ying-Gee Wong; John Christou
- Starring: Yu "Cindy" Shui; Chen "Jerry" Bo Yu
- Narrated by: Yung Chang
- Cinematography: Wang Shi Qing
- Edited by: Hannele Halm
- Music by: Olivier Alary
- Distributed by: Zeitgeist Films
- Release dates: 30 September 2007 (Vancouver International Film Festival); 8 February 2008 (Canada)
- Running time: 93 minutes
- Country: Canada
- Languages: English and Mandarin

Up the Yangtze is a 2007 documentary film directed by Chinese-Canadian director Yung Chang. The film focuses on people affected by the building of the Three Gorges Dam across the Yangtze river in Hubei, China. The theme of the film is the transition towards consumer capitalism from a farming, peasant-based economy as China develops its rural areas. The film is a co-production between the National Film Board of Canada and Montreal's EyeSteelFilm with the participation of the Canadian Broadcasting Corporation, National Geographic Channel, P.O.V., SODEC, and Telefilm. The film is being distributed in the USA by Zeitgeist Films. The United Kingdom distributor is Dogwoof Pictures.

== Plot summary ==
The setting of the film is a riverboat cruise ship floating up the Yangtze river. Two young people are the focus of the film as they work aboard the ship. One is a sixteen-year-old girl from a particularly poor family living on the banks of the Yangtze near Fengdu, named "Cindy" Yu Shui. She is followed as she leaves her family to work on one of the cruise ships serving wealthy western tourists at the same time as her family is being forced from their home due to the flooding that accompanied the building of the dam. The film shows her acclimatization to the consumer economy of tourism as well as modern technology of the cruise ships, juxtaposed with her family and other older citizens who are displaced from a rural lifestyle to cities where they must pay for the vegetables they used to grow on their own.

The other main subject is a nineteen-year-old boy from a more prosperous family named "Jerry" Chen Bo Yu. Chen Bo Yu shows a different perspective from Yu Shui as he tries to earn cash on the ship as a porter and singer.

The film is rich in detail about ways of life, dreams, and aspirations, and seeks to provide a view into the reality of modern Chinese life.

== Critical reception ==
Up the Yangtze was very well received by film critics, and was described as "astonishing" documentary which "refuses to editorialize" by The New York Times. It garnered a 96% rating on Rotten Tomatoes based on 47 reviews, and a rating of 84 on Metacritic.

The film appeared on several critics' top ten lists of the best films of 2008. Ella Taylor of LA Weekly named it the 3rd best film of 2008 (along with Still Life), Rick Groen of The Globe and Mail named it the 7th best film of 2008, and Liam Lacey of The Globe and Mail named it the 10th best film of 2008.

== Screenings and awards ==
Festival	Award	Date
Genie Awards	Best Documentary	2009
Golden Horse Film Festival and Awards	Best Documentary	2008
Sundance Film Festival	Official Selection	2008
Vancouver International Film Festival	Best Canadian Documentary	2008
San Francisco International Film Festival	Best Feature Documentary	2008
International Documentary Film Festival Amsterdam	Joris Ivens Award Finalist	2008
Toronto International Film Festival	Group Canada's Top 10 film	2008
Planete Doc Review	Millennium Award for Best Documentary	2008
Independent Spirit Awards	Best Documentary Nominee	2009

== Epilogue ==
After filming concluded, "Cindy" Yu Shui returned home to finish her education while her family worked odd jobs. The filmmaker Yung Chang published letters indicating that Yu Shui's father had serious eye issues that required surgery and a donation fund was set up.

In 2010, Yung gave further updates on the Yu family, indicating that they were doing much better, with an apartment with television and a refrigerator.

== See also ==
- Bing'ai, a 2007 documentary film about a Chinese woman who refuses to relocate during the building of the Three Gorges Dam
