= Daniel Cross (filmmaker) =

Canadian documentary filmmaker, producer and activist

Daniel Cross a Canadian documentary filmmaker, producer and activist whose films deal with social justice.

Cross is co-founder and president of EyeSteelFilm with fellow director/producer Mila Aung-Thwin. He is also founder of Homeless Nation, a non-profit internet endeavor that started in 2006 and has become a Canadian national collective voice by and for Canada's homeless population. Cross is a professor at the Mel Hoppenheim School of Cinema, Concordia University, Montreal

== Education ==
Cross is a graduate of Concordia University, BFA 91, MFA 98.

== Career ==
Cross directed the films The Street: A Film with the Homeless and S.P.I.T.: Squeegee Punks In Traffic, where hundreds of homeless people from Montreal shared their many, amazing stories with him. From the movie, came the idea of a forum where these stories would not be lost and where Canada's homeless community could share their stories and refuse to be ignored. Both films received theatrical distribution, international broadcast and critical acclaim

Cross also has experience in TV broadcasting, having directed and produced the Gemini nominated Too Colourful for the League and Chairman George on the stations CTV, BBC's Storyville and TV 2 (Denmark).

Chairman George won awards at the AFI/Silverdocs and at Guangzhou Documentary Festival.

He was the executive producer of the internationally acclaimed Up the Yangtze, about a pleasure cruise through the devastation the world's largest hydro-electric dam caused.

In addition to making films, Cross is active in the film community, serving on the boards of CFTPA, Observatoire du Documentaire and DOC (formerly CIFC). He also serves as a board member of Hot Docs Canadian International Documentary Festival and the "Documentary Organization of Canada" and teaches film production at Concordia University in Montreal, Quebec. Previously, he taught at University of Regina in Regina, Saskatchewan.

In 2026, Cross endorsed Avi Lewis in that year's federal NDP leadership race.

== Awards and participations ==
- In 2015 he won the Canadian Screen Award for Best Theatrical Documentary Film and Best Cinematography for I Am the Blues
- He received the Doc Institute Luminary Award, The Trailblazer award at MIPDOC in France, the Don Haig Award at Hot Docs, and is a member of the Provosts Circle of Distinction at Concordia University
- In 2010 he won the United Nations World Summit Award for e-inclusion with his project Homeless Nation
- In 2006, he won the Golden Sheaf Award at Yorkton Short Film and Video Festival for Chairman George alongside Mila Aung-Thwin.

== Filmography ==
- The Street: A Film with the Homeless (1997)
- S.P.I.T. - Squeegee Punks In Traffic (2001)
- Too Colourful for the League (2001)
- Inuuvunga: I Am Inuk, I Am Alive (2004)
- Chairman George (2005)
- Atanasoff, Father of the Computer (2014)
- I Am the Blues (2015)
