= Omar Majeed =

Pakistani-Canadian film director and producer

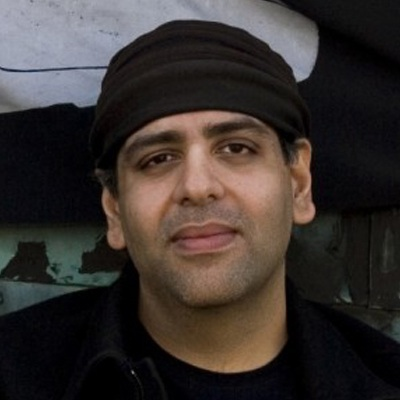
- Citizenship: Canadian
- Education: York University Film School, International Academy of Design (Toronto)
- Occupations: Film director, producer, editor
- Years active: 2000–present
- Parent: Musarrat Nazir (mother)
- Awards: Gemini Award

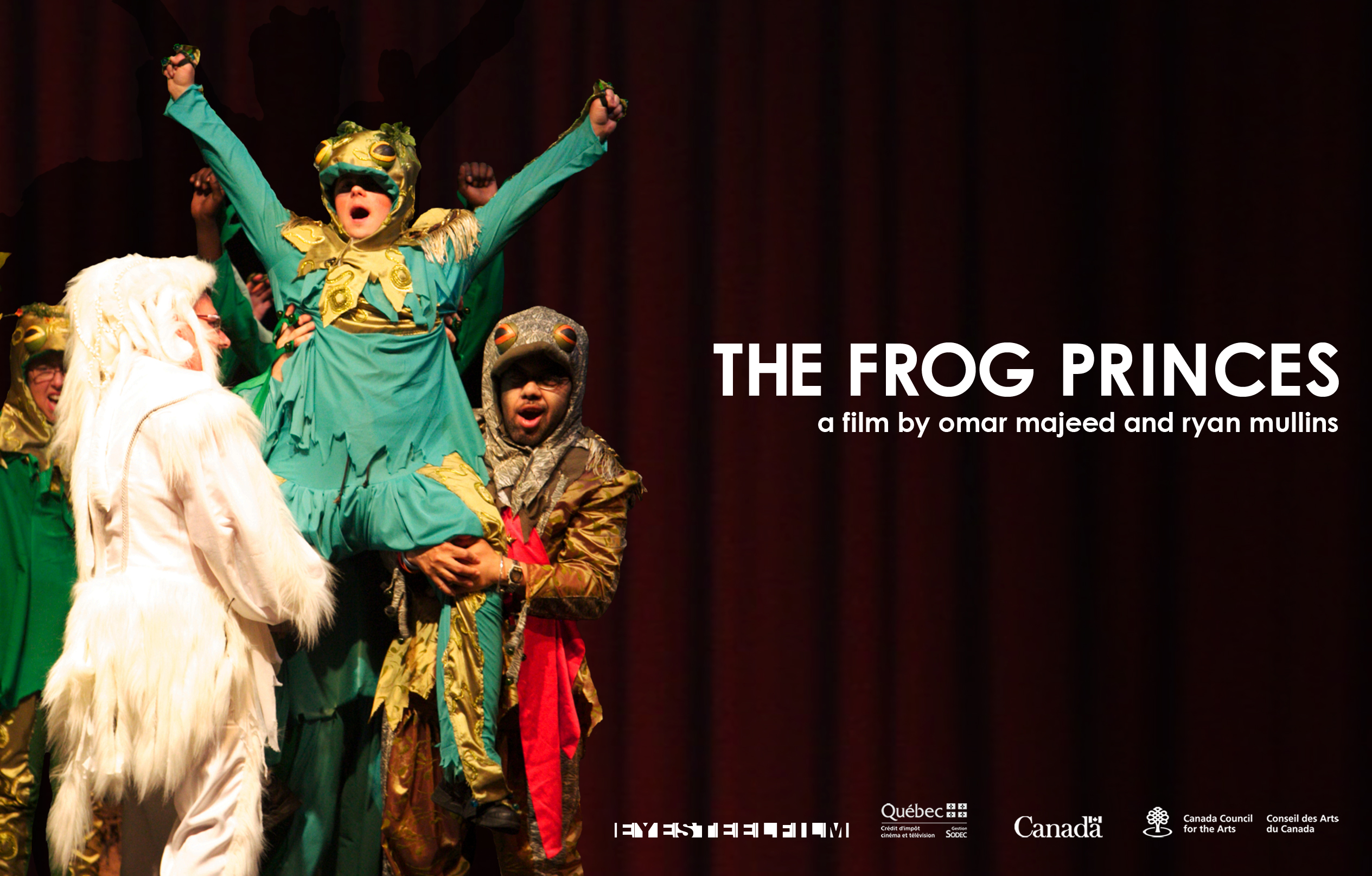
The Frog Princes

Omar Majeed is a Canadian film director and producer. Having studied cinema at the York University Film School and later studied editing at the International Academy of Design in Toronto, he went on to work as a producer in Toronto's Citytv and won a Gemini Award for his television work. He also worked with Canada's National Film Board through the Reel Diversity program in Montreal and with EyeSteelFilm. He is the son of Pakistani actress and singer Musarrat Nazir.

He is known for his 2009 documentary film, Taqwacore, produced by EyeSteelFilm, about a number of Taqwacore bands and performers touring the United States and Pakistan. Majeed filmed the documentary between 2007 and 2009, and it was subsequently released on 16 October 2009.

Before Taqwacore, he worked at CityTV as an editor on the shows QT: QueerTelevision and SexTV and as a producer at Book Television.

Majeed's 2009 documentary Taqwacore is a look at the Muslim punk movement that sprung Michael Muhammad Knight's book The Taqwacores and features members of The Kominas, Diacritical, Secret Trial Five, and Al-Thawra. It has been shown at several international festivals, including the Vancouver International Film Festival, Montreal's Festival du nouveau cinéma, the International Documentary Festival of Amsterdam (IDFA), the Gothenburg Film Festival and the Available Light Film Festival in Whitehorse. It has played theatrically in Canada and will open across the United States in 2010. The film had its U.S. premiere at Austin's South by Southwest Film Festival in March 2010.

He also co-directed The Frog Princes with Ryan Mullins about a young theatre troupe training for a play, under extraordinary circumstances as all twenty members of the cast have intellectual and developmental disabilities. The film was also shown nationally on the Canadian Broadcasting Corporation (CBC) on 6 August 2011.

== Filmography ==
=== Director ===
- 2003: "The Boy Code... Forming Masculinity / The Descent of Men" (8 Nov. 2003 episode / SexTV)
- 2005: Stare with Your Ears: Ken Nordine (for BookTelevision)
- 2008: Exquisite corpse (video short)
- 2009: Taqwacore: The Birth of Punk Islam
- 2010: The Frog Princes (co-directed with Ryan Mullins)
- 2024: Disco's Revenge (co-directed with Peter Mishara)

=== Editor ===
- 2000-2001: QT: QueerTelevision
- 2001-2005: SexTV
  - 2002: "Trembling Before G-d / Midori" (6 July 2002) (Editor, post-production)
  - 2002: "Big, Bold & Busty / David Sterry / Jane's Guide" (Additional editor)
  - 2003: "The Cockettes / Aural Sex: The Art of Erotic Talk" (Additional editor)
  - 2003: SexTV Roundtable: "Shooting Porn" (Editor)
  - 2003: "Connecting... Sex, Love and Romance in Cyberspace" (Editor, post-production)
  - 2003: "Hugh Hefner / Sex and Elderly Homes / Porn Orchestra" (Editor)
  - 2003: "Synthetic Desires: Living with Dolls" (Editor)
  - 2003: "Fairy Tales / Karin Rosenthal / Tart Cards" (Editor)
  - 2003: "The Boy Code... Forming Masculinity / The Descent of Men" (Editor, director)
  - 2004: "Pride and Joy" (Editor)
  - 2004: "Heera Mandi / Sex Advice to All Creation / A Moment with... Al Link and Pala Copeland (Editor, additional segment producer, additional footage)
  - 2005: "The Andropause Debate / Elinor Carucci / Ian Kerner" (Additional footage)
- 2008: P.O.V." (1 episode) entitled Up the Yangtze (as post-production coordinator)
- 2011: Inside Lara Roxx

=== Producer ===
- 2003-2005: BookTelevision
- 2004: SexTV
  - Heera Mandi / Sex Advice to All Creation / A Moment with... Al Link / Pala Copeland (editor)

== Festivals ==
Omar Majeed's Taqwacore has been shown in many festivals including:

- Vancouver International Film Festival (world premiere)
- Montreal's Festival du Nouveau Cinéma—Temps Zero stream
- Sheffield Doc/Fest

== Awards ==
- Gemini Award for television work
