= Taqwacore (disambiguation) =

Taqwacore is a subgenre of punk music dealing with Islam. It may also refer to:

- The Taqwacores, a 2003 novel by Michael Muhammad Knight
  - The Taqwacores (film), a 2010 film adaptation of the novel, directed by Eyad Zahra
- Taqwacore (film), a 2009 documentary film by Omar Majeed
