= Taqwacore (film) =

- Theatrical release poster
- Directed by: Omar Majeed
- Written by: David Oliveras
- Produced by: EyeSteelFilm; Mila Aung-Thwin; Daniel Cross
- Starring: Michael Muhammad Knight; The Kominas; Al Thawra; Vote Hezbollah; Secret Trial Five; Omar Pitras Waqar; Riz Ahmed
- Cinematography: Mark Ellam; Zachary Dylan Fay
- Edited by: Maxime Chalifoux; Omar Majeed
- Music by: Omar Pitras Waqar
- Distributed by: EyeSteelFilm
- Release date: 19 October 2009
- Running time: 80 minutes
- Country: Canada
- Language: English

Taqwacore: The Birth of Punk Islam is a 2009 documentary film, directed by Omar Majeed and produced by EyeSteelFilm, about various Taqwacore bands and performers touring the United States and Pakistan. The documentary was filmed between 2007 and 2009. It was pitched at the 2007 Sheffield Doc/Fest MeetMarket prior to completion.

== Appearances ==
Many individuals are featured in the documentary, including:

- Michael Muhammad Knight, author of 2003 novel The Taqwacores about punk Islam where he imagined a community of Muslim radicals: mohawked Sufis, riot grrrls in burqas with band patches, skinhead Shi’as etc. Knight is American convert to Islam who joins the band in their tour.
- The Kominas, a Pakistani punk band from the suburbs of Boston, Massachusetts. Members:
  - Basim Usmani (bass and vocals)
  - Shahjehan Khan (guitar and vocals)
  - Arjun Ray (guitar and vocals)
  - Imran Malik (drums)
- Al-Thawra, heavy metal Arab band from Chicago featuring Marwan
- Omar Pitras Waqar of Diacritical from Washington DC
- Vote Hezbollah, fronted by Kourosh, an Iranian from San Antonio
- Secret Trial Five an all-female Canadian punk rock band fronted by Sena, a Pakistani lesbian from Vancouver

== Synopsis ==
The Pakistani punks The Kominas have arrived at the last stop of their first American tour and are celebrating with tourmates. Also appearing are the author Michael Muhammad Knight (The Taqwacores), Koroush (Vote Hezbollah), Sena (Secret Trial Five), Omar Pitras Waqar (Diacritical) and Marwan (Al-Thawra).

They incite a riot of young hijabi girls at ISNA, the largest Muslim gathering in North America, after Sena takes the stage. Omar Pitras Waqar leads the audience in a chant of "Stop the hate" these are lyrics from the anti-racist Diacritical song "Ignorance". As the police shut things down they escort the Kominas off stage the audience is heard chanting "PIGS ARE HARAM!" Actor Riz Ahmed is seen arguing with police and organizers off-stage about the censorship and police harassment.

The film then travels with Knight to Pakistan, where his friends (in a new band named after Noble Drew Ali) bring punk to the streets of Lahore and elsewhere in the region. Michael also begins to reconcile his fundamentalist past with the rebel he has now become.

== Festivals ==
- Vancouver International Film Festival, world premiere
- Festival du Nouveau Cinéma, Montreal, Quebec premiere
- Sheffield Doc/Fest, European premiere
- Theatrical release October 19, 2009
- Festival International du Film Indépendant, Lille, France, winner of the Silver Butterfly prize, 2011
