= The Taqwacores (film) =

- Theatrical release poster
- Directed by: Eyad Zahra
- Screenplay by: Eyad Zahra; Michael Muhammad Knight
- Story by: Michael Muhammad Knight (novel)
- Produced by: David Perse; Allison Carter; Nahal Ameri
- Starring: Dominic Rains; Bobby Naderi; Noureen DeWulf
- Cinematography: JP Perry
- Edited by: Josh Rosenfield
- Music by: Omar Fadel
- Release date: January 24, 2010 (Sundance)
- Country: United States
- Language: English

The Taqwacores is a 2010 film adaptation of the 2003 novel The Taqwacores by Michael Muhammad Knight. The film was directed by Eyad Zahra and stars Bobby Naderi, Dominic Rains, and Noureen Dewulf. The film imagines a fictitious Islamic punk rock scene through characters living in a punk house in Buffalo, New York. It was filmed in Cleveland, Ohio.

== Plot ==
A sophomore majoring in engineering, Yusef (Bobby Naderi) seeks living quarters with fellow Muslims after a year in the godless dorms. He moves—rather improbably, given his conservative nature—into a building inhabited by various punky misfits (it is unclear whether they are also students) wrestling with their cultural and religious identity. Or, as red-mohawked guitarist Jehangir (Dominic Rains) puts it, their "mismatching of disenfranchised subcultures."

Others include ever-shirtless skateboarding wild man Amazing Ayyub (Volkan Eryaman), spike-haired stoner Fasiq (Ian Tran) and brawny, glowering Umar (Nav Mann), the would-be moral enforcer in a houseful of rebels against Koranic strictures. Sole female in residence is Rabeya (Noureen DeWulf), who wears a head-to-toe burka yet is full of ideas that might be considered blasphemous.

== Cast ==
(in alphabetical order)

- Noureen DeWulf as Rabeya
- Jim Dickson as Gas Station Bully
- Volkan Eryaman as Amazing Ayyub
- Denise George as Dee Dee Ali
- Marwan Kamel as himself (Cameo)
- Anne Leighton as Lynn
- Nav Mann as Umar
- Rasika Mathur as Fatima
- John Charles Meyer as Hamza
- Bobby Naderi as Yusef
- Dominic Rains as Jehangir Tabari
- Nicholas Riley as Harun
- Ara Thorose as Lead Singer of The Ghilmans
- Ian Tran as Fasiq
- Tony Yalda as Muzzamil

=== Music ===
The Taqwacores features an original score by Los Angeles composer, Omar Fadel, as well as licensed music from The Kominas, Omar Pitras Waqar of Diacritical and The Fanaa Fish, Sagg Syndicate and Al-Thawra.
