= John Charles Meyer =

American actor and film producer

John Charles Meyer is an American actor and film producer.

== Career ==
He had a recurring role as Jesus in the second season of Mom, and has made guest appearances in Hawaii Five-0, NCIS, Anger Management, Mike & Molly, and others. He played young Giuseppe Salvatore in the seventh season of The Vampire Diaries. His film roles include The Taqwacores and The Millennium Bug.

John produced the comedy feature Dave Made a Maze, which was released in theaters across the U.S. and Canada on August 18, 2017.

== Filmography ==
=== Film ===
Year	Title	Role	Notes
2009	Kontrast	Ali's Boyfriend	
2010	The Taqwacores	Hamza	
2011	The Millennium Bug	Billa Crawford	
2012	Vandez	Teddy	
2013	Our Boys	Fintan / Robert	
2013	Avenged	Creed	
2014	Apartment Troubles	Reginald the creep	
2015	Don Quixote	Galley Slave	
2018	The City of Gold	Jorge Escamilla	
2020	Disrupted	Fred Ross	
2020	Loco	Mikey	

=== Television ===
Year	Title	Role	Notes
2007	Buried Alive	Hayden	Miniseries
2008	iCarly	Dirk	Episode: "iAm Your Biggest Fan"
2008	Zoey 101	Band Member #2 / Dirk	Episode: "Chasing Zoey"
2009	Weed Shop	Frank	Episode: "Pilot"
2009	The Forgotten	Quint	Episode: "Pilot"
2009	Cost of Living	Roommate #2	Television film
2009	The Big Time Show	Dr. J	5 episodes
2010	CSI: NY	Antonio Reyes	Episode: "Criminal Justice"
2010	Gimme Shelter	Miles	Television film
2011	Southland	Billy Stearn	Episode: "Cop or Not"
2011	Mike & Molly	Dylan	Episode: "Victoria Runs Away"
2011	Awakening	Mark Ritter	Television film
2012–2014	Devil's Couriers	Richie	17 episodes
2014	Anger Management	Jack	Episode: "Charlie, Lacey & the Dangerous Plumber"
2015	Weird Loners	David	Episode: "Weird Pilot"
2015	Mom	Jesus	2 episodes
2015	Hawaii Five-0	Tim Richards	Episode: "Lehu a Lehu"
2015	The Vampire Diaries	Young Giuseppe Salvatore	Episode: "Mommie Dearest"
2015	Discount Fitness	Terry	Episode: "Cuckold"
2016	NCIS	Ronald Ayers	Episode: "Enemy Combatant"
2016	Pub Quiz	Grizzled	Television film
2017	Rideshare	Passenger 1	Episode: "Filthy Hippie"
2018	Lucifer	Tío Sorrento	Episode: "City of Angels?"
2018–2019	A Girl Named Jo	Lenny Alvarez	10 episodes
2019	RelationFixTM	Nathaniel	Episode: "I Love You Man, Just Not All Day Everyday"
2025	Leverage: Redemption	Jack	Episode: "The Shakedown in Clone-Town Job"
