= Next! (TV series) =

- Written by: Bob Odenkirk; Zach Galifianakis; B. J. Porter
- Directed by: Keith Truesdell
- Starring: Bob Odenkirk; Fred Armisen; Zach Galifianakis; Jay Johnston; Rocky Marquette; Rasika Mathur; Jerry Minor; Patton Oswalt; Brian Posehn; Jill Talley; Susan Yeagley; Nick Swardson
- Country of origin: United States
- No. of seasons: 1
- No. of episodes: 2

Production
- Running time: 23 minutes

Original release
- Network: Fox
- Release: 2002

Next! is an American sketch comedy series featuring former Saturday Night Live writer Bob Odenkirk. It was originally produced by 20th Century Fox Television in 2001. Two pilot episodes and a few extra sketches were filmed but the show was cancelled before airing. FOX ultimately chose to produce Cedric the Entertainer Presents instead of Next!

The show features a number of notable alternative comedians as both cast members and writers including Zach Galifianakis, Fred Armisen, Patton Oswalt, Jay Johnston, and Jerry Minor.

== Description ==
Each episode of Next! consists of a series of sketches. Often, common characters or situations are revisited at different times throughout an episode. The cast and writing style were reminiscent of Odenkirk's previous sketch comedy show "Mr. Show". Many of the show's sketches were constructed with a strong critique of modern television in mind, including parodies of commercials, news and sports broadcasting, and music videos.

=== Conventions ===
Both episodes begin with a sketch summarizing current events featuring a fictional news team led by Bob Odenkirk and feature a parody music video inspired by contemporary recording artists such as R. Kelly and Limp Bizkit.

=== Main cast ===
- Bob Odenkirk
- Fred Armisen
- Zach Galifianakis
- Jay Johnston
- Rasika Mathur
- Jerry Minor
- Brian Posehn
- Jill Talley
- Susan Yeagley
- Nick Swardson

=== Writing staff ===
- Bob Odenkirk
- Zach Galifianakis
- Scott Aukerman
- B. J. Porter

== Reception ==
Although never receiving an official television airing, the two pilot episodes and additional extra sketches have been made available and subsequently achieved minor success on the internet.

== Characters ==
- Prajamali Patel (Rasika Mathur) is an intrepid world reporter.
- Gerhardt Lipshitz (Fred Armisen) is the German host of "Focus on Talent", a parody of "Inside the Actors Studio".
- Zach Galifianakis (Zach Galifianakis) is a lonely lounge singer at a piano bar.
- Red (Patton Oswalt), short for Fred, is a frequenter of Internet chat rooms and a Superman enthusiast.
- Sen. Stroke Thrumberland (Bob Odenkirk) is the oldest living senator at 111, and the last remaining member of the Whig Party.
- Sexykitty12 (Brian Posehn) is a special education xylophone teacher who owns 12 cats and prefers heavy women.
- Billy Essy (Jay Johnston) is an incompetent used car salesman at Essy Bros. Auto, where you can always steal a deal.
- Steve Essy (Bob Odenkirk) is the manager of Essy Bros. Auto. and authorized maker of commercials.
- L'Tony (Jerry Minor) is an R&B recording artist and sensual patriot.
- Roger Billy Bush is George W. Bush's third cousin, once removed and two blocks over. A dropout with a substance abuse problem, he is the creator of the RRWTF (The Racin' Rasslin' Wet T-shirt Federation) and the face of the "Lighten Up, America!" campaign.
- Sgt. Fred (Fred Armisen) is an expert on airport security who has trained with the seals. He is the creator of a celebrated video series on airport security called "Never Blink".
- Bill Genders (Jay Johnston) is a Chicago area sports reporter covering Michael Jordan's retirement.
- Arnie Maxwell (David Cross) is a lawyer specializing in work-related accidents and acts of terrorism.
- Bread-Winnerz, feat. (Bob Odenkirk), (Bill Odenkirk), and (Jay Johnston), is Nu metal garage band formed by local neighborhood fathers, inspired by the song "My Way" by Limp Bizkit. Their lead single "My House, My Rulez", from the album "Money Doesn't Grow on Treez", was the subject of a behind-the-video feature.
