= Delta Phi Beta =

American South Asian co-ed fraternity

- ΔΦΒ
- Founded: June 15, 1992; 33 years ago Berkeley
- Type: Social
- Affiliation: Independent
- Status: Active
- Emphasis: Cultural - South Asian
- Scope: Regional
- Pillars: Community involvement, cultural awareness, academic excellence, and social enhancement
- Colors: Blue and Silver
- Symbol: Elephant
- Chapters: 3
- Headquarters: Westwood, California; United States

Delta Phi Beta (ΔΦΒ), is an American co-ed South Asian fraternity. It was established at the University of California, Berkeley in 1992.

== History ==
Delta Phi Beta was established on June 15, 1992, at the University of California, Berkeley by South Asian and Asian American students. The fraternity was established as "a reaction against the growing schism forming within the South Asian Community" with hopes that "South Asian people, regardless of religion or country, could communicate their different beliefs". It was the first South Asian (Indian) fraternity in the United States.

== Symbols ==
Delta Phi Beta's colors are blue and silver. Its symbol is the elephant. Its pillars are community involvement, cultural awareness, academic excellence, and social enhancement.

== Activities ==
The fraternity hosts a variety of social events. The University of California, Los Angeles chapter co-sponsored a cultural conference on campus in 2005. It also held a Festival of India in 2006 that featured the Indian-American performers, including comedian Rasika Mathur and rapper Karmacy.

== Philanthropy ==
The fraternity's members participate in various service activities, including the Aga Khan Partnership Walk, Buddylimpics, Habitat for Humanity, and beach cleanups at Playa Del Rey. It members have also raised funds for the Ronald McDonald House Charities and LA Works. On ongoing philanthropy is funding the establishment two schools in impoverished rural area's of India. Members also raised thousands of dollars for earthquake relief in India.

The Alpha chapter started its annual charity formal, Sahayaki, in 2001. In 2001, the proceeds from Sahayaki went to the India Development and Relief Fund. In 2003, proceeds supported ASHA-LA.

== Membership ==
Delta Phi Beta is co-ed.

== Chapters ==
Following is a list of Delta Phi Beta chapters. Active chapters are indicated in bold. Inactive chapters are in italics.

Chapter	Charter date	Institution	Location	Status	Ref.
Alpha	1992	University of California, Berkeley	Berkeley, California	Inactive	
Beta	1999	University of California, Los Angeles	Los Angeles, California	Inactive	
**Gamma**	c. 2005	University of California, Davis	Davis, California	Active	
