= The Taqwacores =

2003 book by Michael Muhammad Knight

- Author: Michael Muhammad Knight
- Cover artist: Cover design by Ben Meyers; Cover Photograph by Mellissa Secore
- Language: English, Italian
- Genre: Novel
- Publisher: Soft Skull Press (US) Telegram (UK), Newton Compton (Italy)
- Publication date: 2003 (self-published); 2004 Autonomedia; 2007 Telegram, Newton Compton; 2009 Soft Skull Press
- Publication place: United States, United Kingdom, Italy
- Media type: Print (Paperback)
- Pages: 254 p. add i(paperback edition)
- ISBN: 978-1-57027-167-0 (Autonomedia edition), ISBN 1-59376-229-1 (Soft Skull Press edition)
- OCLC: 56668508

The Taqwacores is the debut novel by Michael Muhammad Knight, depicting a fictitious Islamic punk rock scene. The title is a portmanteau of taqwa, an Islamic concept of love and fear for God, and Hardcore, the punk rock subgenre. Some of the most popular taqwacore bands are The Kominas, Al-Thawra, Secret Trial Five, Diacritical and Fedayeen.

Knight originally self-published The Taqwacores in DIY zine format, giving copies away for free until finding distribution with Alternative Tentacles, the punk record label founded by Jello Biafra. After receiving an endorsement from Peter Lamborn Wilson (aka Hakim Bey), the novel was published by radical press Autonomedia. A UK version is published by Telegram Books. In its Italian translation, the novel is retitled Islampunk.

The narrator of The Taqwacores, Yusuf Ali, is a Pakistani American engineering student from Syracuse, New York, who lives off campus with a diverse group of Muslims in their house in Buffalo. Besides being their home, the house serves as a place to have punk parties and a place for Muslims not comfortable with the Muslim Student Association or local mosques to have Friday prayer.

The book also inspired a documentary entitled Taqwacore: The Birth of Punk Islam, directed by Omar Majeed, which follows author Michael Muhammad Knight and several Taqwacore bands across the United States. It was released in Montreal, Quebec, Canada, at the Cinéma du Parc on October 19, 2009.

Soft Skull Press is publishing the revised edition, which became available in December 2008.

== Censorship ==
Due to the Danish Jyllands-Posten Muhammad cartoons controversy, the UK edition of The Taqwacores was partially censored.

== Film ==
A feature film adaptation of The Taqwacores directed by Eyad Zahra premiered at the 2010 Sundance Film Festival in Utah. also titled The Taqwacores (film)

== Cultural impacts ==
Asra Nomani credited the novel as first presenting her with the idea for woman-led prayer, leading to a widely reported woman-led congregation on March 18, 2005 with Amina Wadud acting as imam.
