= Mishara =

Mishara is a surname. Notable people with the surname include:

- Kamil Mishara (born 2001), Sri Lankan cricketer
- Peter Mishara, American-Canadian documentary filmmaker
- Sara Mishara, American-Canadian cinematographer
