= Dave Made a Maze =

- Theatrical release poster
- Directed by: Bill Watterson
- Screenplay by: Steven Sears; Bill Watterson
- Story by: Steven Sears
- Produced by: John Charles Meyer; John Chuldenko
- Starring: Nick Thune; Meera Rohit Kumbhani; Kirsten Vangsness; Stephanie Allynne; James Urbaniak; Scott Krinsky; Adam Busch; John Hennigan
- Cinematography: Jon Boal
- Edited by: David Egan
- Music by: Mondo Boys
- Production companies: Butter Stories; Dave Made An LLC; Foton Pictures
- Distributed by: Gravitas Ventures
- Release dates: January 21, 2017 (Slamdance); August 18, 2017 (United States)
- Running time: 80 minutes
- Country: United States
- Language: English
- Budget: >$500,000
- Box office: $34,117

Dave Made a Maze is a 2017 American fantasy adventure comedy horror film directed by Bill Watterson, and starring Nick Thune, Meera Rohit Kumbhani, Adam Busch, Kirsten Vangsness, Stephanie Allynne, James Urbaniak and John Hennigan. The film centers on the titular Dave who builds a cardboard fort that somehow supernaturally houses an entire labyrinth full of deadly traps and creatures. It premiered at the Slamdance Film Festival on January 21, 2017, where it won an Audience Award for Best Narrative. It was released on August 18, 2017, by Gravitas Ventures.

== Plot ==
While his girlfriend Annie is away for the weekend, 30-year-old Dave works fervently on his next big art project. Dave has a habit of not being able to finish anything, is apparently jobless and gets his income from his parents, whom he believes are tired of him. He finally has a breakthrough and begins to build something from the center and work his way out. When Annie comes home, she is surprised to find Dave's project: a small cardboard fort that is supposedly bigger on the inside. Dave, who communicates with Annie from the vents he added, tells her not to enter or destroy his project. When Annie shakes the exterior, she is confused by the abundance of noise and machinery she hears on the inside.

Annie calls Gordon, who comes to the same conclusion, and he, in turn, calls several of their friends over, including Leonard, Brynn, Greg, Jane and Harry, a filmmaker, along with his boom operator and cameraman. They also randomly bring over a hobo (because he apparently "knows about cardboard") and two Flemish tourists. Leonard briefly leaves the apartment in disappointment when he learns they cannot enter. Harry tries to get a reaction out of Annie for a supposed documentary he is filming and upon realizing how much she truly cares about Dave, the whole group (minus the hobo) all enter the maze. Annie, Gordon, Harry and his crew stick together as they see first hand the true surreal and supernatural nature of the maze and travel from room to room where they realize that it houses living origami birds and other creatures. Leonard later returns to the apartment and throughout the film is seen following close behind the group, while the Flemish tourists appear to simply be having a picnic in the maze.

Eventually, the main group run into Jane, who, after stepping on a lever, has her head chopped off by an ax (though instead of blood, her body squirts out red yarn and confetti). Greg and Brynn find themselves in some catacombs and Greg trips a wire and is impaled by a trap. Brynn meets up with Annie and the rest and when they return to Greg discover his body is missing. Based on the "paint can prints" Gordon deduces that a Minotaur took his body away. Annie uses a box cutter to cut through the walls and realizes that the maze is alive. As the group jump through the wall, the Minotaur kills Brynn. The group run into Dave, who leads them to safety. Dave admits that he is not sure how the maze came to be how it is, but he knows that it is growing on its own and that it might be connected to his imagination. He insists that they finish the maze so that they can escape, even though he is not sure how. Dave also reveals that his hand is now made entirely of cardboard due to sticking it into an odd vulva-shaped hole.

After several other near-deaths, the group realize that they need to attack the maze at its heart, which Dave neglected to make. They reach a strange cardboard puppet version of Brynn who keeps asking for high fives. They immediately realize it is a trap and Gordon, Harry and his crew keep it distracted by interviewing it while Dave and Annie go off to find the heart. After another surreal moment of clarity, Dave and Annie manage to make a heart resembling a zoetrope. They cut through the wall which causes the maze to react. Gordon, Harry and the crew attempt to catch the fake Brynn which suddenly produces a giant demonic hand. The hand retreats, but the cameraman is dragged along with it. He tosses the bag of tapes to Harry before dying.

The group reunite as Gordon distracts the Minotaur by leading it away. He passes Leonard who is killed by cardboard saw blades. Dave, Annie, Harry and the boom operator set up the heart and using a wakizashi, slice the heart causing all the walls and the entire maze to fall. Everyone finds themselves back in the apartment and they proceed to clean up all the cardboard. Harry tasks Gordon with telling the families of those who died and asks Dave what they should call the documentary. Dave sarcastically suggests Dave Made a Maze, despite Gordon's belief that it was a labyrinth. As Dave and Annie toss the last of the cardboard by the dumpster, they fail to notice the Minotaur climbing out along with an origami bird.

== Cast ==
- Meera Rohit Kumbhani as Annie
- Nick Thune as Dave
- Adam Busch as Gordon
- James Urbaniak as Harry
- John Hennigan as The Minotaur
- Frank Caeti as Boom Operator
- Scott Narver as Cameraman
- Stephanie Allynne as Brynn
- Kirsten Vangsness as Jane
- Scott Krinsky as Leonard
- Tim Nordwind as Greg
- Rick Overton as Hobo
- Drew Knigga as Flemish Tourist
- Kamilla Alnes as Flemish Tourist

== Reception ==
=== Critical response ===
On review aggregation website Rotten Tomatoes, the film has an approval rating of 86% based on 58 reviews, with an average rating of 7.5/10. The website's critical consensus reads, "Dave Made a Maze offers decent storytelling but plunges deep into bold stylistic waters, establishing director Bill Watterson as a fresh and inventive filmmaker." Metacritic gave a score of 60 out of 100 based on 9 reviews, indicating "mixed or average" reviews.

=== Accolades ===
Award / Film Festival	Country	Date of ceremony	Category	Recipient(s)	Result	Ref(s)
Florida Film Festival	USA	May 1, 2017	Grand Jury Award for Best Narrative Feature	Dave Made a Maze	Won	
Sitges Film Festival	Spain	October 14, 2017	New Visions One	Dave Made a Maze	Won	
Slamdance Film Festival	USA	January 20–26, 2017	Audience Award for Best Narrative Feature	Dave Made a Maze	Won	
Omaha Film Festival	USA	March 7–12, 2017	Jury Prize for Best Feature Film	Dave Made a Maze	Won	
Sun Valley Film Festival	USA	March 15–19, 2017	One in a Million Award	Dave Made a Maze	Won	
Fantaspoa	Brazil	May 19-June 4, 2017	Jury Award, Best Feature Film	Dave Made a Maze	Won	
Fantaspoa	Brazil	May 19-June 4, 2017	Jury Award, Best Art Direction	Jeff White	Won	
Strasbourg European Fantastic Film Festival	France	September 15–24, 2017	Audience Award, Best Feature Film	Dave Made a Maze	Won	
Boston Underground Film Festival	USA	April 26-May 3, 2017	Audience Award, Best Feature Film	Dave Made a Maze	Won	
Shivers Film Festival	Germany	November 23–28, 2017	Audience Award, Best Feature Film	Dave Made a Maze	Won	
Calgary Underground Film Festival	Canada	April 17–23, 2017	Audience Award, Best Feature Film	Dave Made a Maze	Won	
Saturn Awards	USA	June 27, 2018	Best DVD or Blu-ray Release	Dave Made a Maze	Won	
Calella Film Festival	Spain	June 22-July 1, 2018	Creative Rosebud Award, Best Screenwriting	Steven Sears and Bill Watterson	Won	
