= Disco's Revenge (film) =

2024 Canadian documentary film

- Directed by: Omar Majeed; Peter Mishara
- Written by: Omar Majeed; Peter Mishara
- Produced by: Noah Segal; Sam Sutherland; Christina Piovesan; Dave Harris
- Starring: Nile Rodgers; Billy Porter; Nona Hendryx; Nicky Siano; Jellybean Benitez
- Cinematography: Ashley Iris Gill
- Edited by: Omar Majeed; Peter Mishara; Navin Harrilal
- Music by: Tom Westin; Jody Colero
- Production companies: Elevation Pictures; 86 Media House
- Distributed by: Elevation Pictures
- Release date: May 2, 2024 (Hot Docs)
- Running time: 100 minutes
- Country: Canada
- Language: English

Disco's Revenge is a 2024 Canadian documentary film, directed by Omar Majeed and Peter Mishara. The film centres on the history and culture of disco music, tracing the ways in which the genre is still a central influence on contemporary pop music despite its nominal "death" in the late 1970s.

It features interviews with and archival performance footage of key figures such as Nile Rodgers, Billy Porter, Nona Hendryx and LaBelle, Grandmaster Flash, Fab Five Freddy, Nicky Siano, Earl Young and The Trammps, Jellybean Benitez, Kevin Saunderson, Sylvester and Martha Wash.

The film premiered at the 2024 Hot Docs Canadian International Documentary Festival.

== Awards ==
Award	Date of ceremony	Category	Recipient(s)	Result	Ref.
Canadian Screen Awards	June 1, 2025	Best Feature Length Documentary	Peter Mishara, Omar Majeed, Christina Piovesan, Noah Segal, Sam Sutherland, Dave Harris, Nile Rodgers, Vivian Scott Chew, Stanley Nelson Jr.	Nominated	
Canadian Screen Awards	June 1, 2025	Best Cinematography in a Documentary	Ashley Iris Gill	Nominated	
