= Ittaqullah =

Islamic phrase in Arabic

Ittaqullah (Arabic: اتقوا الله) is an Arabic word or word-phrase composed of the words "Ittaqu" (the command or imperative form of the word taqwa), and "Allah". It is found in several verses in the Quran, and appears often in Muslim literature.

It has been translated variously as "fear God", "keep your duty to Allah and fear Him", "guard your duty to Allah", "be careful of (your duty to) Allah", "be pious to Allah", "be aware of Allah", to "love and be faithful to", as well as fear Allah, "piety".

An Islamic encyclopedia explains:

...Ittaqullah has been used numerous times in the Quran and means to follow and remain in harmony with the laws of Allah. In verse 5:2 it has been used as an antonym of udwan, or rebellion, disobedience...
