= Coffee, Kill Boss =

2013 film directed by Nathan Marshall

Coffee, Kill Boss is a 2013 film starring Eddie Jemison, Noureen DeWulf and Robert Forster, and co-starring Richard Riehle, Zibby Allen, Chris Wylde, Jack Wallace, Denise Grayson and W. Cameron Tucker. Directed by Nathan Marshall and written by Sigurd Ueland, Coffee, Kill Boss premiered on opening night of the 2013 Austin Film Festival. In 2010, the screenplay for Coffee, Kill Boss (then titled 10 Habits of Highly Effective People) was a finalist in the Austin Film Festival Screenwriting Competition. Set on the 20th floor of a monolithic corporate tower, Coffee, Kill Boss follows ten executives who secretly meet to sell off their company, but instead become victims of an outrageous murder scheme.

Coffee, Kill Boss was filmed onsite at the Milgard Windows corporate offices and boardroom in Simi Valley, CA. The film premiered on opening night at the 2013 Austin Film Festival, taking the slot previously reserved for Argo, and was later distributed by Devolver Digital and Cinedigm. It was one of the first feature films made available on Steam, and is also available digitally on Amazon Prime, Hulu, iTunes, and Google Play.

== Festivals ==
1. 2013 Austin Film Festival
2. 2013 Eugene International Film Festival [WINNER: GRAND JURY AWARD, BEST COMEDY FEATURE]
3. 2014 Maryland International Film Festival [WINNER: GRAND JURY AWARD, BEST FEATURE]
4. 2014 SOHO International Film Festival [WINNER: GRAND JURY AWARD, BEST DIRECTOR-Nathan Marshall]
5. 2014 Comedy Ninja Film and Screenplay Festival [WINNER: BEST FEATURE FILM, BEST DIRECTOR-Nathan Marshall, BEST ACTOR-Eddie Jemison, BEST ACTRESS-Noureen DeWulf and Zibby Allen]
6. 2014 Waterfront Film Festival
7. 2014 Tyrolean International Film Festival
8. 2014 Moondance International Film Festival
9. 2014 Gwinnett Center International Film Festival [WINNER: BEST FEATURE FILM, BEST DIRECTOR-Nathan Marshall, BEST ACTOR-Eddie Jemison, BEST ACTRESS-Noureen DeWulf]
10. 2014 Landlocked Film Festival
11. 2014 Naperville Independent Film Festival

== Reviews ==
1. Richard Propes, The Independent Critic
2. Bears Fonte, AMFM Magazine
3. EJ Feddes, SpunkyBean.com
4. Lisa Mejia, Austin Fusion Magazine
5. Mark Krawczyk, WeLiveFilm on YouTube
6. Eric Brian Stevens www.vox.com/mx (Spanish)
