= West Bank Story =

2005 American musical short film

- Directed by: Ari Sandel
- Written by: Kim Ray; Ari Sandel
- Produced by: Bill Boland; Ashley Jordan; Amy S. Kim; Ravi Malhotra; Ari Sandel; Pascal Vaguelsy
- Starring: Ben Newmark; Noureen DeWulf; Joey Naber; A.J. Tannen
- Cinematography: Gavin Kelly
- Edited by: Avi Youabian
- Music by: Yuval Ron
- Release date: January 20, 2005 (Sundance)
- Running time: 21 minutes
- Country: United States
- Language: English
- Budget: $73,000-74,000

West Bank Story is a 2005 American musical comedy short film directed by Ari Sandel, co-written by Sandel and Kim Ray, produced by Pascal Vaguelsy, Amy Kim, Ashley Jordan, Ravi Malhotra, and Bill Boland, and featuring choreography by Ramon Del Barrio. The film is a parody of the classic 1961 musical film West Side Story, which in turn is an adaptation of Romeo and Juliet. The film follows the rivalry between falafel restaurants, one Israeli and the other Palestinian, respectively named the "Kosher King" and the "Hummus Hut," and the romance between the latter's cashier and an Israeli soldier in the West Bank. The film stars Ben Newmark as the IDF soldier, Noureen DeWulf as the Palestinian cashier, A.J. Tannen as the Israeli restaurant owner, and Joey Naber as his Palestinian rival.

Filmed on a Santa Clarita, California ranch, the short premiered at the 2005 Sundance Film Festival, and was screened at numerous additional film festivals across the world, garnering several awards. In 2007, at the 79th Academy Awards, it won the Oscar in the category Best Live Action Short Film.

== Plot ==
The film begins with a scene in which the Palestinians and Israelis are both snapping their fingers, similar to the opening scene of West Side Story. The two parties head to their own family-owned falafel stands (Hummus Hut and Kosher King) where they sing "Our People Must Be Fed/Our People Must Be Served". During the day, Hummus Hut employee Fatima and Israeli soldier David are daydreaming about each other (in the romantic duet "When I See Him"). When Fatima rushes to give a customer his forgotten leftovers, she has a chance encounter with David, and they realize their mutual attraction.

Upon returning to the shop, Fatima's brother shows her that the Kosher King Jews have a machine that encroaches a few inches onto their property. The head of Hummus Hut throws a rock into the machine, making it malfunction, provoking a standoff between the two families (resolved by David and Fatima). Ariel, head of the Kosher King, decides he is going to build a wall. After they leave, David and Fatima stay, and David indicates he'll come to her balcony that night.

The construction begins, and the Palestinians plan to end it abruptly ("We're Gonna Build It"). As such happens, David goes to Fatima's house ("This Moment Is All We Have"), wanting to kiss her, but Fatima refuses, saying it will only escalate the conflict. They head over to stop the fight. As they do, it is revealed to Fatima's family that they are in love. The following fight tips over a canister of gasoline, causing the entire stand to catch fire. David goes to warn the Israelis, who celebrate - until an ember reaches the Kosher King, which proceeds to catch on fire. As the Hummus Hut denizens celebrate, Fatima points out to everyone that they are only making their lives worse.

The next morning, expectant falafel customers are oblivious to the fire, and still want food. Ahmed and Ariel have nothing, but David and Fatima scrape together some of the remaining food, merging the two falafel stands. After the others are working, David and Fatima kiss. At the very end, Fatima asks what will happen if their families cannot stop fighting. David says he will "take you to a place called... Beverly Hills", alluding to the song "Somewhere" in West Side Story.

== Awards ==
- Academy Awards
  - Live Action Short Film 2006
- Now Film Festival
  - Finalist
- Indianapolis International Film Festival
  - Audience Award - Best Short
- Malibu Film Festival
  - Special Jury Award - Best Live Action Short Film
- Method Fest
  - Special Mention
- Stony Brook Film Festival
  - Festival Grand Prize

== See also ==
- List of American films of 2005
