= Noureen DeWulf =

American actress

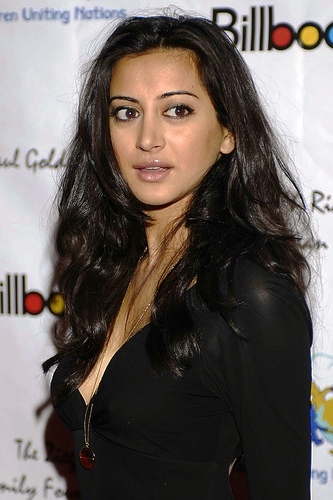
- DeWulf in 2007
- Born: Noureen Ahmed; New York City, U.S.
- Education: Boston University in 2002
- Occupation: Actress/comedian
- Years active: 2005–present
- Spouses: James DeWulf (m. 2000; div. 2010) Ryan Miller (m. 2011)
- Children: 2

Noureen DeWulf (née Ahmed) is an American actress and comedian. She is best known for her film roles in West Bank Story (2005), Ghosts of Girlfriends Past (2009), and The Back-up Plan (2010). She also starred as Lacey on the sitcom Anger Management (2012–2014).

== Early life and education ==
DeWulf was born Noureen Ahmed in New York City to Gujarati parents from Pune, India and grew up in Stone Mountain, Georgia. She was raised Nizari Ismaili Muslim. Her father was a physician. She has two sisters. Her older sister, Aziza, teaches law at Northeastern University in Boston. Her younger sister, Sara, practices law in San Francisco. DeWulf attended Boston University's School for the Arts and studied international relations and theatre. After graduation, she relocated to Los Angeles to pursue a career in acting. She is fluent in Hindi, Urdu, and Gujarati.

== Career ==
DeWulf began her acting career in the Academy Award-winning short film West Bank Story, where she played the lead role of Fatima, a singing and dancing Palestinian cashier who falls in love with an Israeli soldier. She has been working in comedic television series and films ever since. From 2009-11, she played recurring roles on NBC's Outsourced, TNT's Hawthorne and MTV's The Hard Times of RJ Berger, and appeared in the Lifetime miniseries Maneater.

DeWulf has been seen in a number of box-office hits, including Ocean's Thirteen (2007), and The Back-up Plan (2010). She starred opposite Matthew McConaughey in the romantic comedy film Ghosts of Girlfriends Past (2009), and played opposite Jeremy Piven in The Goods: Live Hard, Sell Hard (2009). She starred in The Taqwacores (2010), which premiered at Sundance Film Festival in 2010. She co-starred with Charlie Sheen in the television sitcom Anger Management, which aired from 2012 to 2014 on FX. In 2014, DeWulf won Best Actress at the Comedy Ninja Film and Screenplay Festival for her portrayal of a murderous temp in the independent film Coffee, Kill Boss.

In 2014, DeWulf was ranked #93 in Maxim magazine's "Hot 100" for the second time (the first time being 2007), as one of the most desirable women on the planet according to the magazine's readers. In 2009, she was listed in the 'Top 30 under 30' for Nylon magazine. In addition, DeWulf has appeared in pictorials in Details, Men's Health, Zink, Giant, and Complex.

In March 2015, DeWulf joined the cast of reality show Hockey Wives, chronicling her life with husband Ryan Miller, a goaltender in the NHL. The series follows wives and girlfriends of professional hockey players.

== Personal life ==
She was previously married to artist James DeWulf.

On September 3, 2011, DeWulf married National Hockey League goaltender Ryan Miller in Los Angeles. The couple have two children.

== Filmography ==
=== Film ===
Year	Title	Role	Notes
2004	Happy Birthday		Short film
2005	West Bank Story	Fatima	Short film
2006	American Dreamz	Shazzy Riza	
2006	National Lampoon's Pledge This!	Poo Poo	Direct-to-video
2007	Americanizing Shelley	Littly J. Singh	
2007	Ocean's Thirteen	'Nuff Said expo girl	
2007	The Comebacks	Jizminder Featherfoot	
2008	Killer Pad	Delilah	
2008	Pulse 3	Salwa Gamal	Direct-to-video
2009	The Strip	Maliah	
2009	Ghosts of Girlfriends Past	Melanie	
2009	The Goods: Live Hard, Sell Hard.	Heather	
2010	The Taqwacores	Rabeya	
2010	The Back-up Plan	Daphne	
2010	The 41-Year-Old Virgin Who Knocked Up Sarah Marshall and Felt Superbad About It	Kim	Direct-to-video
2011	Breakaway	Reena Singh	
2012	The Babymakers	Bride	
2012	Zambezia	Pavi	Voice role
2013	How to Be A Terrorist: In Hollywood with Abu Nazir		Short film
2013	Coffee, Kill Boss	Temp	
2014	They Came Together	Melanie	
2016	Chee and T	Shana	
2017	Bad Match	Terri Webster	
2018	When We First Met	Margo	
2019	Endings, Beginnings	Noureen	
2019	The Wedding Year	Boss Queen	
2020	Wheels of Fortune	Mandy	

=== Television ===
Year	Title	Role	Notes
2005	CSI: NY	Matrice Singh	Episode: "On the Job"
2005	Girlfriends	Jasmine Crane	Guest role; 2 episodes
2006	Welcome to the Jungle Gym	Amy	Unsold television pilot
2006	Mindy and Brenda	Mindy	Unsold television pilot
2006	Numbers	Santi	Episode: "Harvest"
2006	Love, Inc.	Tricia	Episode: "Curb Your Enthusiasm"
2007	Revenge	Nadia	Unsold television pilot
2008	Courtroom K	Rose Marie Cheeks	Unsold television pilot
2008	Chuck	Lizzie	Episode: "Chuck Versus the Marlin"
2008	Welcome to The Captain	Shampoo Girl	Episode: "The Letter"
2009	Two Dollar Beer	Fakhri	Unsold television pilot
2009	90210	Nika Raygani	Guest role; 2 episodes
2009	Reno 911!	Hot librarian	Episode: "VHS Transfer Memory Lane"
2009	Maneater	Polo	Television mini-series; 2 episodes
2010–2011	Hawthorne	Judy Pasram	Recurring role; 5 episodes
2010	'Til Death	Dina	Episode: "The Joy of Learning"
2010	The Hard Times of RJ Berger	Claire	Guest role; 2 episodes
2011	Hail Mary	Ingrid Collins	Unsold television pilot
2011	Outsourced	Vimi	Guest role; 3 episodes
2011	Happy Endings	Molly	Episode: "Secrets and Limos"
2012–2014	Anger Management	Lacey	Main role; 100 episodes
2014	Garfunkel and Oates	Jennifer	Episode: "Road Warriors"
2014	Over the Garden Wall	Pumpkin Gal (voice)	Episode: "Hard Times at the Huskin' Bee"
2015–2016	Hockey Wives	Herself	Cast member; 13 episodes
2015–2016	Grandfathered	Priya	Guest role; 2 episodes
2016	Square Roots	Saleena Desai	Television film
2016	Hell's Kitchen	Herself	Episode: "Crepe Grand Prix"
2016	Life in Pieces	Dionne	Episode: "Will Trash Book Spa"
2017	The Problem with Apu	Herself	Documentary film
2018	Living Biblically	Emily	Episode: "Thou Shalt Not Bear False Witness"
2018	All Night	Mrs. Lewis	Recurring role; 5 episodes
2020–2021	Good Girls	Krystal	Recurring role
2020	Tacoma FD	Donna	Recurring role; 2 episodes
2025	Acapulco	Roxanne	Episode: "Higher Love"

=== Web ===
Year	Title	Role	Notes
2012	First Dates with Toby Harris	Sarah	Episode: "Ex-Boyfriends"
2012–2013	Burning Love	Titi	Recurring role; 10 episodes
2014	Kiss Her I'm Famous	Hannah	Guest role; 2 episodes
