= Peter Mishara =

Peter Mishara (born May 26, 1976) is an American-Canadian documentary filmmaker, most noted as co-director with Omar Majeed of the 2024 documentary film Disco's Revenge. The film was a nominee for the DGC Allan King Award for Best Documentary Film at the 2024 Directors Guild of Canada awards, and a Canadian Screen Award nominee for Best Feature Length Documentary at the 13th Canadian Screen Awards in 2025.

Born and raised in New York City, he was educated at Temple University and the University of Southern California before moving to Toronto in 2010 after marrying Canadian film producer Christina Piovesan.

In 2012 he received a grant from the Harold Greenberg Fund and The Movie Network toward the production of his first short film, which was released in 2014 as Sprnva.

Mishara and Majeed collaborated on the 2018 documentary web series The Artists: The Pioneers Behind the Pixels, for which they won the Canadian Screen Award for Best Web Series, Non-Fiction at the 7th Canadian Screen Awards in 2019.

In 2021 Mishara received a grant from the Hot Docs Canadian International Documentary Festival toward the production of a forthcoming documentary about underground hip-hop musician Divine Styler.
