= QT: QueerTelevision =

Canadian television series

QT: QueerTelevision is a Canadian television newsmagazine series that was produced by CHUM Television and aired on Citytv and CablePulse 24 in the late 1990s and early 2000s. Focusing on lesbian, gay, bisexual and transgender (LGBT) issues, the series was hosted by Irshad Manji. In addition to coverage of general LGBT issues in Canada and internationally, the show was one of the venues where she developed some of her early ideas about the reform of Islam.

The series began in 1998 on CablePulse 24 as The Q Files. It changed its name to QT: QueerTelevision in 2000 when it was added to Citytv's schedule, to fit in with that channel's other news and information series such as FashionTelevision, Breakfast Television, MovieTelevision and MediaTelevision. The series was also broadcast via streaming video on the LGBT website PlanetOut.

At the 16th Gemini Awards in 2001, Omar Majeed won a Gemini for Best Editing in an Information Program or Series for the segment "Secrets of Sight".

The series ended in 2001.
