= Christina Piovesan =

Canadian film and television producer

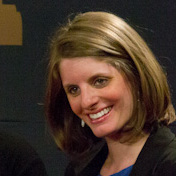
Image of Christina Piovesan

Christina Piovesan is a Canadian film and television producer. She is most noted as a producer of the films The Whistleblower, which was a nominee for Best Motion Picture at the 32nd Genie Awards in 2012, and Summer with Hope, which was a nominee for Best Motion Picture at the 11th Canadian Screen Awards in 2023.

An alumna of the University of Southern California, she launched her production company First Generation Films in 2007.

== Filmography ==
=== Film ===
- Miracle Mile - 2004
- My Father - 2007
- Amreeka - 2007
- The Whistleblower - 2010
- Red Lights - 2012, coproducer
- The Lesser Blessed - 2012
- Life - 2015
- Regression - 2015
- Kitty - 2016
- Paper Year - 2018
- Mouthpiece - 2018
- American Woman - 2019
- Strange but True - 2019
- The Nest - 2020
- French Exit - 2020
- The Exchange - 2021
- Summer with Hope - 2022
- Alice, Darling - 2022
- Infinity Pool - 2023
- A Good Person - 2023
- Disco's Revenge - 2024
- Bonjour Tristesse - 2024
- Lilith Fair: Building a Mystery - 2025

=== Television ===
- The Artists: The Pioneers Behind the Pixels - 2018
- Home Sweet Rome - 2022, executive producer
- Pinecone & Pony - 2022, executive producer
