= Taqwa =

Islamic term for awareness of God

Taqwa (Arabic: تقوى taqwā / taqwá) is an Islamic term for being conscious and cognizant of God, of truth, "piety, fear of God." It is often found in the Quran. Those who practice taqwa — in the words of Ibn Abbas, "believers who avoid shirk with Allah and who work in His obedience" — are called muttaqin (Arabic: المُتَّقِين al-muttaqin). (See:Fear of God and God-fearer)

== Quran ==
According to Erik Ohlander, the word taqwa is used in the Qur'an over 100 times. According to the Oxford Dictionary of Islam, the word taqwa and its derivatives appear "more than 250 times" in the Qur'an.

This is the Book in which there is no doubt, (it is) guidance for the muttaqin (those who adopt taqwa i.e. obey Allah).

— Al-Baqarah, 2:2

The imperative form of taqwa is found in the phrase Ittaqullah ("fear God" or "be aware of Allah"), which is in a number of verses.

=== Benefits of Taqwa in the Quran ===
The Quran says there are benefits of taqwa. Sura at-Talaq Q.65:2-3 says that God will give Muttaqin solutions to their problems.

And whoever fears Allah - He will make for him a way out And will provide for him from where he does not expect. And whoever trusts in Allah; Allah is sufficient for him. ..Whoever fears or obeys Allah, He makes his work easy for him....and whoever fears or obeys Allah, Allah removes his sins and increases the reward of his deeds.

— At-Talaq Q.65:2-5

So whoever gives charity and practices taqwa (obeying Allah's and Islam's prohibitions), and verifies and believes in the good, We make easy for him the easy path. And whoever is miserly and careless or istighnaah and disbelieves in good things and disbelieves, I make him an easy way to the things of hardship.

— Surah Lail, 92: 5-7

According to Sura al-Anfal Q.8:29, to Muttaqin, God will give them furqan or conscientious intellect by which they can differentiate between right and wrong.

O you who believe! If you obey and fear Allah, He will grant you Furqan (differentiator, between right and wrong, from Arabic root Faraq, difference), and will expiate for you your sins, and forgive you; and Allah is the Owner of the great bounty.

— Al-Anfal, Q.8:29

== Hadith ==
The Prophet (peace and blessings of Allah be upon him) said in the Farewell Hajj speech, "People! Your Lord is One. You are all created from Adam and Adam from the soil. Those among you who are most pious and conscious of God are the most honorable in the sight of Allah. No Arab is superior to a non-Arab except in Taqwa." ./O people! Verily your Lord is one. An Arab is not better than a non-Arab and a non-Arab is not better than an Arab; a red man is not better than a black man and a black man is no better than a red man—except in Taqwa (Consciousness about Allah)…”

— — (Musnad Ahmad, 22391, 22978 ; Al-Silsilat al-Sahih, 2700).

Ibn Umar (may Allah be pleased with him) said, "A servant cannot attain true piety until he abandons that which causes doubt in his mind."

— Bukhari 2

Abu Huraira said, Rasulullah was asked which action would take the most people to Paradise. He said, 'Fear of Allah (Taqwa) and good character.' — Tirmidhi, Hadith: 2004

The Prophet (peace and blessings of Allah be upon him) said, A Muslim is the brother of another Muslim. He will not oppress him. Don't look down on him. Taqwa resides here (Qalb). With this he pointed three times towards his chest. It is enough for a man to be evil that he despises his Muslim brother. It is forbidden for every Muslim to take one another's blood, his wealth and his honor.

— (Muslim h 32-[2564])

Abu Umamah Radiyallahu 'Anhu said that I heard the Messenger of Allah, may God bless him and grant him peace, give a speech at the farewell Hajj, "Do fear Allah, pray your five times (obligatory) prayers, fast the month of Ramadan, pay Zakat on your wealth and Obey your leaders and rulers (if their command is not contrary to the Shariah), then you will enter the Paradise of your Lord.

— Tirmidhi 616, Ahmad 21657, 21755, (Tirmidhi, he says, the hadith is Hasan Sahih)

On the authority of Abu Bakr Ibn Abu Shayba, Ishaq Ibn Ibrahim and Muhammad Ibn Abdullah Ibn Numayr ... on the authority of Yazid Ibn Arqam. He said, I will tell you the same as the Messenger of Allah, may Allah bless him and grant him peace, used to say. He (Rasulullah Sallallahu Alaihi Wasallam) used to say: "O Allah! I seek refuge in You from incapacity, laziness, cowardice, miserliness, old age and the punishment of the grave. O Allah! Give me piety in my soul (heart) and purify it." You are the Best Purifier of it, You are its Owner and its Sustainer. O Allah! I seek refuge in You from unprofitable knowledge and from a fearless heart; from an unsatisfied soul and from a supplication that is not answered."

— Muslim 6658

Narrated by Abdullah Ibn Mas'ud. He said, The Prophet (peace be upon him) used to say,

"Allahumma Inni Asalukal Huda-Wattuka-Wal 'Afa-Fa Wal Gina-"

(Meaning - O Allah! I look to You for guidance [the right path], taqwa [piousness], avoidance of what is forbidden, and livelihood).

— Muslim 2721, Tirmidhi 3489, Ibn Majah 3832, Ibn Abi Shaybah 29192, Ahmad 3950, Sahih Ibn Hibban 900, Sahih Al Jami’ 1275.

On the authority of Abu Dharr (may Allah be pleased with him), he said: The Messenger of Allah, may Allah bless him and grant him peace, said to me: Wherever you are, do taqwa of Allah +fear and obey Allah), and do good deeds immediately after bad deeds, and evil will be removed and people will be treated with respect. behave well

— Mishkat 5083, Tirmidhi 1987

On the authority of ‘Abdullaah ibn Mas’ood (radhiyallaahu ‘anhu), the Messenger of Allaah (sallallaahu ‘alayhe wa sallam) said: “Verily the most beloved speech to Allaah is the servant's saying, ‘Subhaanak Allaahumma wa bihamdika wa tabaarakasmuka wa ta’aalaa jad-duka wa laa ilaaha ghayruk.’ (Glorified are you, O Allaah, and to you is the praise, Blessed is Your Name and Lofty is your Majesty, there is none worthy of worship other than You.) The most hated speech to Allaah is when a man says to another man, ‘Fear Allaah!’ and he replies, ‘Worry about your own self!’ “

— It was reported by Al-Asbahaanee in At-Targheeb (739), and Al-Albaanee authenticated it in Silsilatul-Ahaadeethis-Saheehah (2598).

== Definitions ==
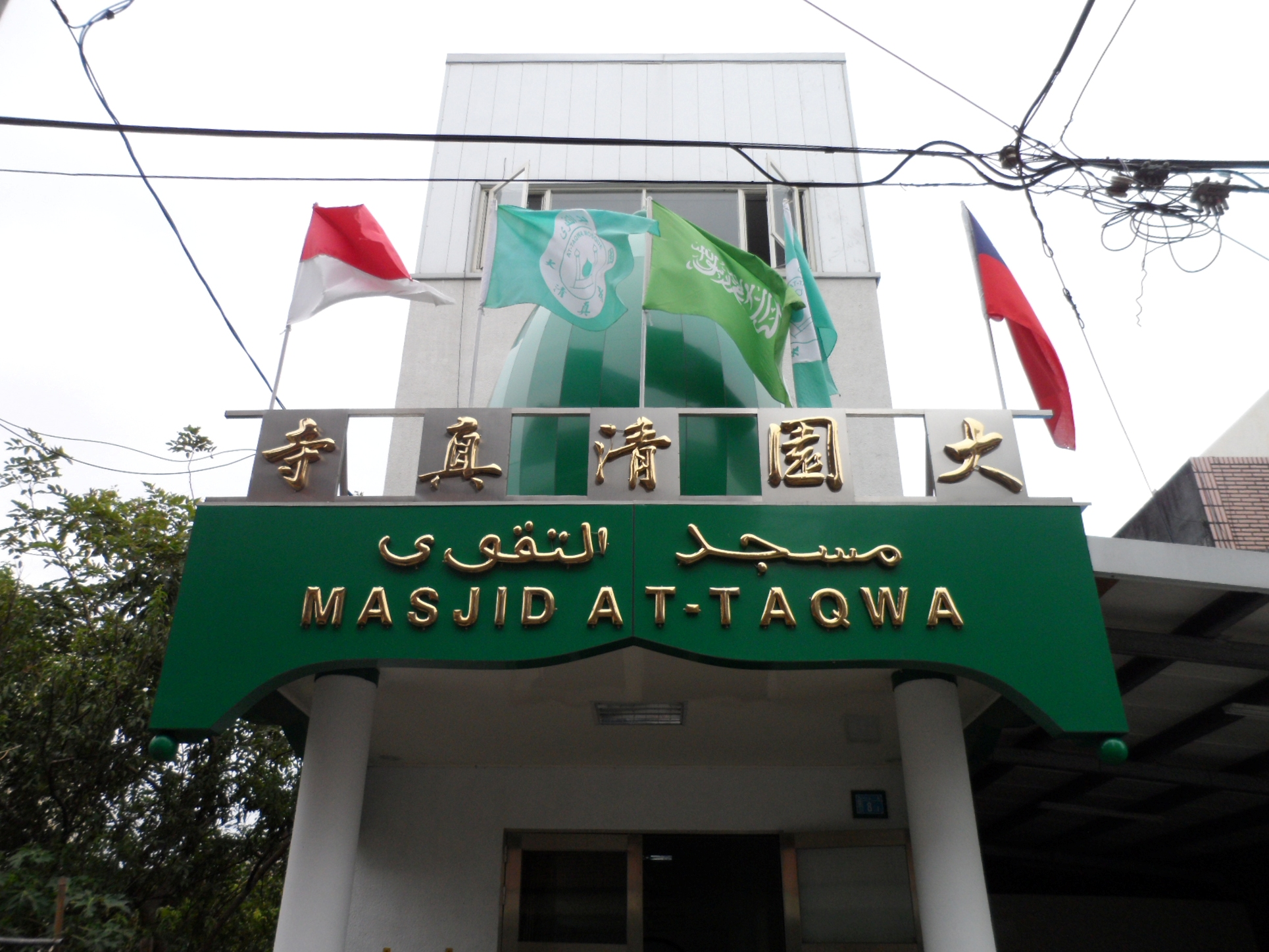
A mosque in Dayuan, Taiwan is named after the word Taqwa.

The word “Taqwã” is derived from the verb waqã (Arabic: وقى), which literally means to preserve, protect, safeguard, shield, etc. The Arabic word taqwa means "forbearance, fear and abstinence."

Some descriptions of the term from Islamic sources include:

- "God consciousness ... piousness, fear of Allah, love for Allah, and self restraint".
- "God-consciousness or God-fearing piety", "virtue", "wariness".
- Fear of Allah, "being careful, knowing your place in the cosmos". "Proof" of Taqwa is the "experience of awe" of God, which "inspires a person to be on guard against wrong action" and eager to do the things which please Allah.
- literally "to protect". In general, to protect yourself "from the Wrath of Allah" by not "indulging in things that Allah forbids".
- "a high state of heart, which keeps one conscious of Allah's presence and His Knowledge." Taqwa motivates the person who possesses it "to perform righteous deeds" and avoid forbidden activities.
- According to Erik Ohlander, in Quranic Arabic, taqwa refers to fear of God in terms of protecting oneself from displeasing God.

== Theological interpretation ==
According to Tafsir ibn Kathir, the root meaning of taqwa is to avoid what one dislikes. It was reported that Umar bin Khattab asked Ubayy ibn Ka'b about Taqwa. Ubayy said, "Have you ever walked on a path that has thorns on it?" Umar said, "Yes." Ubayy asked, "What did you do then?" to which Umar replied, "I rolled up my sleeves and struggled." Ubayy said, "That is taqwa, to protect oneself from sin through life's dangerous journey so that one can successfully complete the journey unscathed by sin."

== Fiqh ==
In at least one popular work of fiqh (Islamic jurisprudence), the "Book of Taqwa", (i.e. the section on taqwa) deals with "knowledge of what is Haraam (forbidden), Makruh (discouraged) and doubtful" in an assortment of matters beyond "the pillars of Islam". These include: foods, dress, things having to do with sex ("private matters"), kinds of sporting contests, music, gossip, bad mouthing, bad company, beard trimming, etc.

== Sufism ==
Taqwa is an important concept in Sufism.

The 10th-century Sufi scholar Al-Qushayri, in his Epistle (Al-Risala al-Qushayriyya), writes about three parts of taqwa: "full trust in God with respect to what has not been granted to him; full satisfaction with what has been granted to him; and full patience with respect to what has eluded him."

In Sufism, taqwa has several degrees. The first degree or rank is that of the common people. This rank shuns anything associated with God. In other words, the common people participate in taqwa by simply avoiding shirk. The second degree or rank of taqwa are the elect who shun sins. The final rank is that of the prophets who avoid attributing acts to anyone other than God — "in other words, their fear comes to them from Him and is [directed] to Him." The highest rank are those who distance themselves from everything that separates them from God, for one of the main goals in Sufism is to get closer to God, because in Sufi thought the state of being separate from God is a privation equivalent to the torments of hell.

The master-disciple relationship is one of great importance within Sufi practice. Taqwa is greatly valued within this relationship. God-fearing piety is seen as great religious devotion because it allows for "unhesitating obedience for the order's superior." In other words, if one can blindly follow his master, then he should be able to blindly follow God. Taqwa then leads to a lack of questioning authority, for the disciple submits to those with greater power than him. This submission reminds the disciple of God's power making the disciple a more devout worshipper of God.

== See also ==
- Taqwacore
- Tawakkul
