= Fedayeen (band) =

American punk band

- Origin: Portland, Oregon, United States
- Genres: Taqwacore; Punk rock
- Years active: 2009–2011
- Labels: iamharam !
- Members: Abu Taha · Raheem Vukas · Hajirah D. Taha Husayn
- Past members: Randal Harris aka "Sagg al-Sistani"

Fedayeen is an American punk band, composed of Abu Taha al-Amriki, Raheem Vukas, Hajirah D. and Taha Husayn. They identify themselves with the Taqwacore Movement, a Muslim punk based sub-culture known for challenging extremism, homophobia, sexism, and violence.

== History ==
Fedayeen formed in 2009. The band's first single, "I Love Osama bin Laden", garnered attention in 23 countries (based on mp3 requests) in the first three weeks after release. A new EP, "The Fedayeen Experience", was released in June 2010, followed by the two song CD single "List the Dead", a tribute to Palestinian children killed by the IDF. They planned on releasing their first LP, 'Peace, Love, and Kalashnikovs', on September 11, 2010. Their first radio feature was planned for May 1, 2010 with Cultural Syndicate, who canceled after a closer review of the band's lyrical content, allegedly due to fear that it might cause offense among listeners. The band has been mentioned in publications such as Bitchface Magazine, Stamp Media, Apen voor Antwerpen as well as countless blogs and posts from around the world. The band claims to take great pleasure in deeply offending both "Flag sucking patriots" and Muslim conservatives alike. and claimed to have already received three death threats in the short time they've been working together, and "hope for many more". Lead vocalist Abu Taha clarifies this statement by explaining that "If you really listen to our lyrics, and don't feel sick to your stomach and pissed off as hell then you either weren't really listening, or are just another WASP who only cares about things like child rape and sexual slavery when it happens to white kids whos' names you can easily pronounce" (a reference to their song Bacha Bazi (Urdu trans. "Boy Play")), a disturbing piece penned by ex-band member Sagg al-Sistani about the well documented trade of young boys in Northern Afghanistan as sex slaves.)

While Fedayeen officially disbanded in late 2011, Raheem and Abu Taha, who were the creative core of the group, continue to make music together and have ventured into hip hop with the 2015 formation of a new group, "ATARI CREED". Abu Taha, who now goes by Akh-Word Poet (Akh being urban slang for a Muslim brother, from the Arabic "Akhi") continues to maintain a strong socio-political focus in his lyrics, but has also expanded their scope to include biographical and other personal content, drawing heavily on his 25 years involvement in the criminal justice system, which began at age twelve, and ended in 2013.

== Discography ==
1. "I Love Osama bin Laden" (single)
2. "Umi" (Single)
3. "The Fedayeen Experience" (EP)
4. "List the Dead" (single)
5. "Legion" (single)
6. "Carry Me into the Light" (single)
7. 'Peace, Love, and Kalashnikovs' (unreleased LP)
