= Secret Trial Five =

Canadian punk music group active 2006 - 2010

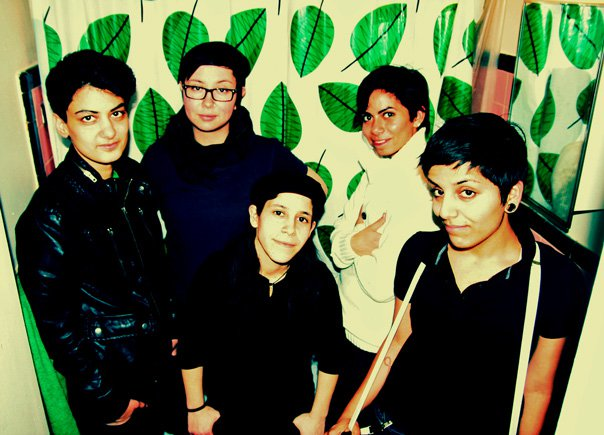
- Secret Trial Five (L to R, back row: Nat, Gabi; front row: Sena, Karim, Sidra)

Background information
- Origin: Vancouver, British Columbia Canada; currently Toronto, Canada
- Genres: Punk rock
- Years active: 2006–present

Secret Trial Five is a Canadian five-piece political punk rock band formed in 2006 in Vancouver.

== Origins ==
Sena Hussain formed Secret Trial Five with four friends following 9/11, when she became interested in making music with political messages. Secret Trial Five takes its name from a group of Muslims suspected of terrorism currently held without charge in Canada.

== History ==
In fall 2007, Secret Trial Five toured the United States with Vote Hezbollah, The Kominas, Al-Thawra, and Diacritical on the Taqwatour. Early in September, Secret Trial Five were prevented from finishing their set at a Chicago show hosted by the Islamic Society of North America; some news agencies have reported that it was because the ISNA did not approve of women singing in public, while others have reported that the audience began quickly leaving during the band's first song.

== Taqwacore controversy ==
Though initially identifying with taqwacore and participating in Omar Majeed's Taqwacore documentary, the band later rejected affiliation with the scene, announcing "We're not taqwacore!" on their website, due to their preference for political ideologies focusing on communities with which they more closely identify.

== Music ==
Among the group's most referenced songs are "Hey Hey Guantanamo Bay" and "Emo-Hurram", the latter a pun on the first month of the Islamic calendar. Other notable songs include Middle Eastern Zombies, We're Not Taqwacore, and Colonizer, a parody of Britney Spears' Womanizer. The band has vocalized their support for the Boycott, Divestment and Sanctions movement and has been censored on numerous occasions. The group names taqwacore band The Kominas as one of its chief influences. Hussain, the lead singer, is openly gay.

== Members ==
- Sena Hussain – Vocals
- Nat Ess – Guitar
- Sidra Mahmood – Guitar
- Gabi Rodriguez – Bass
- Karim Elawar – Drums
