= Taqwacore =

Genre of Islamic punk rock

- Stylistic origins: Punk rock; heavy metal; Sufism; Islamic music
- Cultural origins: 1990s, European and American Islamic communities
- Typical instruments: Guitar; bass guitar; drums

Other topics
- Sufi rock; Taqwa

Taqwacore is a subgenre of punk music dealing with Islam, its culture, and interpretation. Originally conceived in Michael Muhammad Knight's 2003 novel, The Taqwacores, the name is a portmanteau of "hardcore" and the Arabic word "taqwa" (تقوى), which is usually translated as "piety" or the quality of being "God-fearing", and thus roughly denotes reverence and love of the divine. The scene is composed mainly of young Muslim artists living in the US and other Western countries, many of whom openly reject traditionalist interpretations of Islam, and thus live their own lifestyle within the religion or without.

== History ==
Muslim punk music dates at least to the 1979 founding of British band Alien Kulture. In the 1990s, Nation Records act Fun-Da-Mental and Asian Dub Foundation emerged, solidifying the first examples of UK Muslim generated punk. In an interview, Aki Nawaz, founder of Nation Records, stated that "Islam for me was more punk than punk" Knight's novel was instrumental in encouraging the growth of a contemporary North American Muslim punk movement, and many bands who used the term taqwacore were ones that traveled with Knight on the ISNA tour featured in the documentary. Thus, the taqwacore community is almost inseparable with Knight and his literature.

The first bands to use the term taqwacore are The Kominas, Vote Hezbollah and the Sagg Taqwacore Syndicate. Other bands on the scene include, Secret Trial Five, Fedayeen, Sarmust, KB and other bands under SG-Records.

When Kourosh Poursalehi first read The Taqwacores, he took it to be a true account of real Muslims in the United States. He composed a song to Michael Muhammad Knight's poem "Muhammad was a Punk Rocker", and sent it to Knight in New York. Knight was extremely happy with what he heard, knowing that his book had reached real Muslims similar to himself, and he played the song over and over. They ended up meeting in Boston, where with Basim Usmani, the Kominas were formed, and the seeds of their tour were planted.

Pourlaselhi was heavily influenced by the Fearless Iranians from Hell, as he was from the San Antonio area, and the band was also from Texas. He later went on to form the band Vote Hezbollah.

A group of self-identified taqwacore bands traveled in a caravan style tour around the United States as a sort of recreation of Michael Muhammad Knight's original novel in 2007. This was the basis of the documentary on the movement. Bands that appeared in the film are as follows:

The Kominas

- The Kominas members. The Kominas is a Pakistani punk band from the suburbs of Boston, Massachusetts. The members include Basim Usmani (bass and vocals), Shahjehan Khan (guitar and vocals), Arjun Ray (guitar and vocals), and Karna Ray (drums).

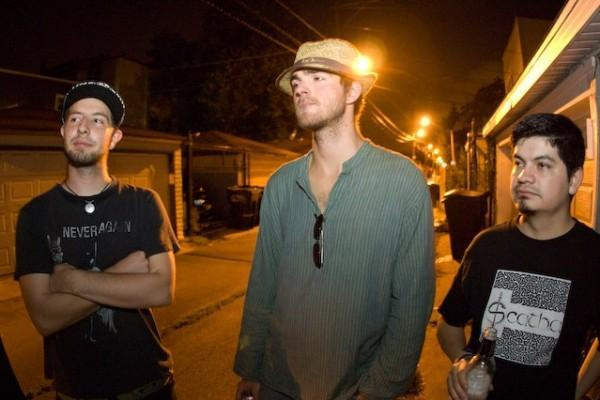
Al Thawra

- Al-Thawra, a heavy metal Arab band from Chicago featuring Marwan
- Diacritical, a DC post hardcore, DIY punk group fronted by Omar Pitras Waqar
- Vote Hezbollah, fronted by Kourosh, an Iranian from San Antonio
- Secret Trial Five, an all-female Canadian punk rock band fronted by Sena, a Pakistani lesbian from Vancouver

Secret Trial Five, however, have stated that they do not associate themselves with taqwacore:

Secret Trial Five

the band has been identified as being part of a genre called "taqwacore", but they now actively reject that association, as it not only limits them, but also, taqwacore has caused a racist, islamophobic and sensationalist media frenzy. it has also been wrongly reported that the inspiration behind secret trial five are the writings of michael muhammad knight: which is false ...

— Secret Trial Five, About Me on the Website

There is not a definitive "taqwacore sound", and the scene is much more diverse now (2011) than the fictional one portrayed in Knight's novel, with artists incorporating various styles, ranging from punk to hip-hop, and musical traditions from the Muslim world; the Kominas describe their sound as "Bollywood punk", Sagg Taqwacore Syndicate are rap and techno inspired music while Al-Thawra uses the term "raicore", based on North African Arabic Raï music. The genre of music is much more specific to topics of consideration, self-labeling, political framework, and ideology.

== Links to the novel ==
The Taqwacores is about punk Islam, where Michael Muhammad Knight imagined a community of Muslim radicals: mohawked Sufis, riot grrrls in burqas with band patches, skinhead Shi’as, but did not limit the term taqwacore to only these groups.

The concept of an individual's Islam is historically popular with Sufism and was solidified in a new American style with the publication of Michael Muhammad Knight's novel. The novel focus's on a household of individual "punk" characters who live their lives according to their own interpretation of Islam.

I stopped trying to define Punk around the same time I stopped trying to define Islam. They aren't so far removed as you'd think. Both began in tremendous bursts of truth and vitality but seem to have lost something along the way—the energy, perhaps, that comes with knowing the world has never seen such positive force and fury and never would again. Both have suffered from sell-outs and hypocrites, but also from true believers whose devotion had crippled their creative drive. Both are viewed by outsiders as unified, cohesive communities when nothing can be further from the truth.

— Michael Muhammad Knight, The Taqwacores, Soft Skull Press

One fictitious character in the novel named Fasiq, an Indonesian Muslim, openly smokes cannabis while reading the Quran. His personal interpretation of Surat Al-Hijr is that the smoking of cannabis is permissible in Islam. Ayats 19 and 20 state:

And the earth - We have spread it and cast therein firmly set mountains and caused to grow therein [something] of every well-balanced thing. And We have made for you therein means of living and [for] those for whom you are not providers.

In the novel, Fasiq determines that since Allah sent down everything that is well balanced, and that humans can use them, cannabis is well balanced and permissible.

Many band members in the recent documentary Taqwacore: The Birth of Punk Islam can be seen smoking hashish while in Pakistan.

=== Disenchantment ===
With bands reporting disenchantment with the role of taqwacore in their lives, the author himself wrote of confusion and self disenchantment in his book titled Osama Van Halen, where he writes himself as a fictional character.

"Michael Muhammad Knight then looked at Amazing Ayyub and immediately, clearly, understood him to be the last lonely survivor of an extinct race"

"Amazing Ayyub made his niyya, read Ya Sin, and vanished. Beyond its function as an invisibility spell, Ya Sin doubled as a prayer for the dead and dying."

The disenchantment and desire to reach a conclusion or catharsis of creating a personal Islam for Michael Muhammad Knight started with his Taqwacore project. The extreme nature of his fictional characters spoke to young Muslims around the world, and sparked a movement of "Taqwacore" labeled bands. Although some bands were happy to be labeled as such, and others did reluctantly, the labeling of a punk band led to problems, much like any labeling can lead to problems.

Our relationship with the taqwacore thing has been fairly unsteady. While we did participate in a lot of the media surrounding it, we didn't start out as a "taqwacore" band, because the project was already underway before I even had any idea that such a thing existed. We were hesitant to use the term, and reluctantly accepted it later on, only to be disillusioned again.

— Marwan from Al-Thawra, Email Correspondence

The Kominas, while still labeled taqwacore, have expressed discontent with their reviews focusing on the Muslim aspect of their music instead of aesthetics or politics.

The all-female punk band Secret Trial Five wrote a song dedicated to their hate of the term Taqwacore, titled "We're not Taqwacore" and can be heard on stage at one performance calling Taqwacore "bullshit", although many of their messages are consistent with the Taqwacore movement. Their lyrics read:

rather hang with taliban
than dick around with drunks
muhammad wasn't white
and neither is this fight
and we weren't birthed
by michael knight

After Knight's novel that experimented in his self-beheading, his discontent was not an end for his exploration in individualistic Islam

Knight's personal disenchantment came to a catharsis in his latest book Why I am a Five Percenter. In a public lecture at the University of Texas, he spoke of how his personal research in the community of the Five Percenter's led him to become a part of their community. This history of the Five Percenters allows him to feel empowered in his personal interpretation of Islam. He writes about his "conversion" and experiences in the community in his book.

== Themes ==
Taqwacore as coined had a definite bond with Islam, progressive Islam and Islam and anarchism. Many of the members of Taqwacore bands are Muslims, through their own interpretations of the religion. Some members, however, are not Muslim. The overarching theme of individual interpretation, as well as a break from Imams, Mainstream Islam, and Classical interpretations of the Qur'an are very prevalent in the music, yet some bands have bent or broken this initial tie with the overarching theme of Taqwacore, as their music deals with more issues than simply Islamic interpretation. Much of Taqwacore is rooted in the spirit of Punk: that of rebellion, political commentary, and activism.

The Kominas are a taqwacore bands, and they have reached people all over the world, and have become interests of many academic articles and press.

Wendy Hsu writes that "Over-emphasizing the band members as “Muslim”, the press has overlooked the non-Islamic sides of the band’s music, image, and membership." She also writes that taqwacore is not limited to music but is "forming a network of friends, artists, bloggers, filmmakers, and other enthusiasts around the self-identified label of taqwacore."

The bands political messages are also linked with cultural questions, multiculturalism, and the interaction of the east and the west. Al-Thawra initially labeled themselves as "raicore", yet another portmanteau combining North African and Algerian raï music and hardcore. He talks about his music and its cultural considerations, linking the ways in which Algerian Chaabi music can be considered rebel music, much like punk itself.

Anyway, initially, "raicore" was a term that I came up with for Al-Thawra's music and put on our first Myspace page back in 2006, because I couldn't think of any other way to describe it. Rai seemed like a natural place for this music to exist, because it was born from similar social phenomena. Our music is something that is of diaspora, with a mentality, identity crisis/allegiance, and musical texture that is caught somewhere between East and West and really belonging to neither. In some ways, Rai and early Chaabi, folk music from Wahran was very influential to me, because it was true people's music. It came from the ports, from the marginalized elements of society in a multicultural city, it spoke of socially taboo subjects. In a sense it was real rebel music. I was very influenced by that and, as delusional as this may sound, is something that I hope to speak to when I started out on this project.

— Marwan from Al-Thawra, Email-correspondence

Fun-Da-Mental are an explicitly political and controversial band with an outspoken concern with social justice (particularly in regard to Britain's treatment of its Asian and Afro-Caribbean citizens) and have been described as "articulat(ing) eclectically a kind of militant Islamic-influenced, pro-Black anti-racist identity politics."

"Vote Hezbollah does not promote violence or support any violent organizations. Peace, unity, and truth are our only strengths.”

== Controversy ==
Knight is criticized for his participation in provocative articles, disrespectful attitude toward leaders of the American Muslim community, open admission of past apostasy (chronicled in his essay "Forget what is and is not Islam" in Leaving Islam: Apostates Speak Out), heretical attitudes, embrace of the Nation of Islam and Nation of Gods and Earths and often rebellious treatment of Muhammad.

Knight developed a reputation for his Muslim WakeUp! articles, particularly accounts of the Islamic Society of North America's annual convention, in which he wrote of giving a "stink palm" to famous imam Siraj Wahhaj and Cat Stevens and engaging in a romantic encounter with a young Muslim woman.

At the 2005 convention of the Islamic Society of North America, Knight and the Kominas fraudulently obtained media passes and sneaked into the press conference of Karen Hughes, Under Secretary for Public Diplomacy and Public Affairs in the U.S. Department of State. They were taken outside and questioned by a State Department agent, but allowed back in by ISNA officials. It was later learned that the ISNA staff was concerned over Knight's jacket bearing the Alternative Tentacles logo.

During the Taqwacore tour that is featured in the documentary film, the group ended at the annual ISNA convention in Chicago. They played on stage using forged media passes at an open mic event. When viewed in the film, many of the younger audience at first were confused, but later cheered for the bands. Singing along with Omar Pitras Waqar to the hook of the Diacritical song "Ignorance" with the lyrical chant of "stop the hate!" When the all-female band Secret Trial Five played on stage, security was called and the group was forced off stage. This was due to the ISNA convention rules of "no-female singers". Actor/rapper Riz Ahmed tried to come to their defense, and argued with the organizers off stage. As the police escorted them out they began a crowd chant of "pigs are haram!" taunting the police. The ragged group gathered outside of the building and Omar Pitras Waqar smashed his guitar on the pavement, as they yelled out "music is haram" ironically. The saga is recorded in the Taqwacore documentary.

The taqwacore groups also dealt with discrimination on the road of their tour. Other drivers flipped them off, or cursed at them. In a scene captured in the documentary, their bus is pulled over in NYC suspected of terrorism, the drum shells in the rear windows being mistaken for propane tanks by fellow drivers on the Brooklyn bridge.

The taqwacore groups thus responded to their alienation, both from the Muslim community and from without. The Kominas performed songs with controversial lyrics such as "suicide bomb the gap," and "Rumi was a homo." These were comments on social issues that spread through both the Muslim community and outside of the community in America. The latter was a commentary on an Anti-Gay Imam from Brooklyn. The musicians also started a joke band named "Box Cutter Surprise", referencing the knives used to hijack planes on September 11. Marwan Kamel, from a band on tour called Al-Thawra, Arabic for "revolution," said that the members created the group to shock audiences. These sentiments were also fueled by Knight's original desire to "find what people are pissed about and talk about it".

== In academia ==
The social movement linked with Knight's novels as well as the musical subculture raised great interest in the academic world. Along with punk, the subgenre has been a subject of cultural studies, religious studies, and more. The novel has allegedly been taught at a number of university courses.

Michael Muhammad Knight also gives public lectures from time to time on the varying subjects of his books, most recently (2011) on his book that deals with the history of the Five Percenters.

Many academic articles, dissertations and masters theses have been written on the topic.

In Heavy metal Islam: rock, resistance, and the struggle for the soul of Islam'' , Mark Levine writes about the relationship of heavy metal and Islam and its history. While not the same specific genre of music, the book covers a wide variety of topics and talks about crowds at shows "dressed in strange combinations of metal, hip-hop, and punk attire." His book addresses the issues that arise with the combination of two seemingly separate cultures, in vivid imagery. He says that "one can see a teenager with green spiky hair and baggy hip-hop style clothing standing next to one in goth makeup, and a few feet away yet another in a black metal T-shirt who’s watching the show with his mother or aunt who may be dressed in a black, full-length abaya." An abaya is a traditional cloak, or over garment worn in the Arab world by women for modesty, and also worn in different styles.

Another paper written by a number of masters students at the Roskilde University write in Looking for Cultural Space Discourses of Identity Formation on the case of Taqwacore, on populations, groups, and individuals belonging in society. They write about a sense of belonging and how identity is formed in relation to the taqwacore movement, stating that "the questions of social inclusion or exclusion have raised new lines of connection within societies" and that this happens more often when individuals "sense of belonging transcends national borders linking to other cultural and social geographies and groupings", which is an essential theme in taqwacore music and the taqwacore movement. Many ideas of belonging to more than one culture is presented in taqwacore music through satire or dark humor.

In Abraham Ibrahim's work on the Queer community of Muslims, "Sodomized by Religion": Fictional Representations of Queer Muslims in the West, he explores different representations of characters that have been systematically oppressed by the orthodox Islamic community. He writes about a few different works, including Michael Muhammad Knight's work "Bilal's Bread" and a film titled A Touch of Pink he writes that "the security concerns about Muslims in the West are remarkably similar to the suspicions about homosexuals: they are not “true” members of the community, and they are quite possibly in league with foreign subversives"

Francis Stewart explores the role of punk in spiritual life in her article "Punk Rock Is My Religion" An Exploration of Straight Edge punk as a Surrogate of Religion. She questions the role of the Straight Edge music ideology in individuals lives, and how it potentially may relate to the taqwacore movement. As one fictional character in the novel was a Straight Edge rocker, many of the real life musicians involved in the taqwacore scene are as well. She writes about the differences between their lifestyle and traditionally proscribed Islamic lifestyles staying that "as with many within hardcore and Straight Edge the religion that is practiced or found amongst individuals within Taqwacore is not that proscribed by or expected within Islamic dogma." Their lifestyles are personalized, "touring bands do not perform salat five times day and although shows will open with a communal prayer, it is men and women praying together so constitutes haram." Their actions are often the opposite of orthodox Islam. Some may be straight edge, which may be in accordance with traditional Islam, but some "will drink and smoke" and perform other acts that may be considered forbidden or "haram" in Islam, "Yet they still consider themselves Muslim’s and some would even describe themselves as religious Muslims."

In Abdou Mohamad's masters thesis for Queen's University titled "ANARCA-ISLAM", he explores what he considers to be a close knit relationship between Islam, Islamic law, and Anarchism. Anarchism has historically been associated with the punk movement, and is a reoccurring slogan in many punk rock, hardcore, and metal songs. Abdou observes that "as taken from academic texts by non- Muslims, is the recognition that resonances exist between Islam and anarchism." He considers the two as "not identical, but neither are they necessarily incompatible."

John Hutnyk writes more specifically about the band that is considered to be taqwacore by some Fun-Da-Men-Tal in "THE DIALECTICS OF EUROPEAN HIP-HOP: Fun^da^mental and the deathening silence." In his article, Hutnyk writes about the role of hip-hop and Islam in a political agenda within the musical world. He writes that "The politics of Fun^da^mental is the politics of hip-hop, crossed with a punk Islam" and that the messages that are presented in their music encapsulate many different issues. These include "interventions around race and representation", the historic and recent deciding factor that started "the war of ‘terror’", as well as what he calls "a radical version of human rights activism."

Amil Khan addresses similar issues, but on a wider spectrum in his book titled The Long Struggle: The Seeds of the Muslim World's Frustration. In his book, he writes, similar to other authors, about the Conversation and relationship between orthodox Islam, westernization, and the results of such. He comments on the orthodox community, arguing that "Even within the most orthodox communities, groups are taking up differing positions on various points, like the use of violence or the interaction between Muslims and non-Muslims", showing that a conversation exists even in what many view as a succinct group. He shows that what some Muslims call the Ummah, or the unified Muslim world, is in fact extremely divided. He says that when Muslims gather at different events, "the audience at any of these events includes the most obviously observant in traditional robes, city workers in neat trim beards, punk rock Muslim teenagers and the merely curious", showing the multitude of lifestyles amongst Muslims.

== See also ==
- Liberal movements within Islam
- Jihadism and hip-hop
