= Alien Kulture =

British punk band active from 1979 to 1981

Alien Kulture was a British punk band active from 1979 through 1981, founded by Ausaf Abbas, Azhar Rana, Pervez Bilgrami, and self-described "token white" Huw Jones. Formed in Balham, and inspired by the nascent punk scene, the Anti-Nazi League and the Rock Against Racism concert series, and wanting to express the frustrations of second-generation Asian immigrants during a period of ethnic tension and race riots in Britain, the members of the band turned to music to achieve politically what they had not been able to via protest rallies, and to draw on their Pakistani Muslim backgrounds to promote an Asian presence in popular culture.

They took their name as a response to then newly elected Prime Minister Margaret Thatcher's stated fears of being "swamped by people with a different culture". In an interview with the Guardian from 2016, former bass player Ausaf Abbas said (of the infamous Thatcher remark): "We interpreted that to mean that if you weren’t white, Anglo-Saxon, middle-class, Protestant, maybe you didn’t fit in."

Seeking to express themselves as youth caught between two cultures, they wrote songs about racism and issues within the Asian community, such as arranged marriage, leading to attacks both from neo-Nazis supporting the National Front as well as other Asians who felt they were disgracing their community. Abbas has stated that Rock Against Racism established conditions for a more assertive and self-confident mood amongst British Asians. The band eventually recorded one single, "Culture Crossover" b/w "Asian Youth", which was released by Rock Against Racism Records. They attracted the support of famed BBC DJ John Peel, who said he played them on the radio, but they were otherwise ignored by mainstream media. They declined an invitation to perform at a concert with The Specials at Coventry Stadium in protest of racial profiling by police because Ausaf and Azhar were due to sit their finals exams at the London School of Economics that same day, and disbanded soon after, having played only 30 shows.

As of 2010, Huw Jones was working in the non-profit sector in Leeds, Pervez Bilgrami was running a recruitment agency with his wife, and Azhar Rana was a partner in a firm of chartered accountants. As of 2016, Ausaf Abbas was working as an investment banker, having initially worked as an economist for BP.
