= Rasika Mathur =

American actress/comedian

Rasika Mathur is an American actress/comedian best known for her recurring role on the original version of Wild 'n Out.

== Early life ==
Mathur was born in Ottawa, Ontario, Canada, to Hindu immigrant parents from India, but grew up in Houston, Texas and attended Albright Middle School in Alief, Texas and Elsik High School. She discovered her comedic side in seventh grade, after a teacher asked her to feed her dog while she was away: "That teacher soon said to me, 'Take my acting class' and I did, and it was amazing. I got to free up my inner weirdo. Once we got to draw masks, and everyone loved the lion I drew. Something was always in me, roaring quietly, ready to be unleashed. (Ha, that was a cool metaphor.) Soon, out poured all the funny voices, silly characters, and hilarious wit that had built up inside me."

At the University of Texas at Austin, she studied creative advertising with a minor in Japanese and was active in the Student Association.

== Comedy career ==
After college, she moved to Chicago and worked as a copywriter at a large advertising firm, while at night she studied improvisation at The Second City Training Center: "I day-jobbed and had an improv affair with Second City by night. Still have the hickeys to prove it." She also performed with Stir Friday Night!, a Chicago-based Asian American sketch comedy troupe.

After moving to LA to film a pilot that did not get picked up, Mathur faced difficulty:

Now I was living out of the trunk of my car. Mooching. Being broke. I mean broke like, you want to go out to eat late night with friends and you’re holding back tears reading the menu, having to make sure the side of eggs is really $1.49 and not $2.49, ’cause otherwise you just won’t eat. The vine I was trying to swing to wasn’t quite in front of me yet, so sometimes I had to grab a hold of air. To make ends meet I had to cater waitering. Being a children’s party clown or Dora the Explorer with a football-shaped head. Serving whiny, bandaid-on-their-forehead customers at Starbucks at 5 a.m. Graveyard shifts at Dr. Phil’s studios. It was a nightmare. But I also realized that I needed to keep my eyes open to the comedy in all those situations, and back-pocket it to use on stage, like during shows at IO-West, or in improv classes at the Groundlings. That kept me going.

She continues to perform stand-up around the country. She appeared on the show Wild'N Out on MTV2, where she kissed Lauren Flans, another former cast member. Her influences are Christopher Guest, Chevy Chase, Three Amigos, Saturday Night Live (the David Spade years) In Living Color, Adam Sandler, The Count, Ben Stiller, Vince Vaughn, Woody Allen and Diane Keaton.

== "The Sari (W)rap" ==
Mathur's debut musical comedy album, "The Sari (W)rap", was released in November 2010 on Rukus Avenue Records.

Track listing
No.	Title	Length
1.	"I Don't Practice Enough"	4:01
2.	"The Threading Salon Chronicles"	2:08
3.	"Threading Rap -- A Song For Hairy Girls"	1:55
4.	"Back That Thing Up"	4:31
5.	"Borders"	1:20
6.	"Indita Mia (Let Me Lube You)"	6:33
7.	"The Indian Irish Drinking Song"	2:54
8.	"My Guitar Teacher Is White"	4:51
9.	"Cricket"	0:40
10.	"We Love You England"	4:19
11.	"Cremation"	4:53
12.	"Punctuation"	0:39
13.	"Wedding Disaster"	4:31
14.	"I Think I'm Gonna Kama Sutra"	5:48
15.	"Their Satanic Majesties Last Guitar Lesson"	1:38
16.	"The Sari (W)rap"	2:27

== Filmography ==
=== Film ===
Year	Title	Role	Notes
2002	Next!	Various	TV movie
2003	Melvin Goes to Dinner	Extra	
2003	Comedy Central Laughs for Life Telethon 2003	Adopted Girl	TV movie
2004	Missing Sock	The Guru	Short
2005	Don't Fear the Reaper	Hooker with a Heart of Gold	Short
2006	Totally Real TV	Susan	Short
2006	BBQ Bill	Rasika	Video short
2007	Deserted: The Webseries	Sanjina	
2008	Cloverfield	Party Goer	
2008	An Inconvenient Penguin	Dr. Sumi	Video short
2009	Nilam Auntie: An International Treasure	Nilam Auntie / Laxmi Harjoshi	Short
2010	The Taqwacores	Fatima	
2010	Blowout Sale	Customer	Short
2011	The King's Speech Parody LOL	Herself	Short
2011	Crazy, Stupid, Love	Emily's Assistant	
2011	Doctors Without Boundaries	Dr. Hari Pasi	Short
2012	Just for You	Girl With Flowers	Short
2013	Shotgun Wedding	Violet	
2014	Rubberhead	Bride #3	TV movie
TBA	Concert Heroes		

=== Television ===
Year	Title	Role	Notes
2003	3 Non-Blondes	Herself	Series Regular
2005	Stacked	Sally	Episode: "Beat the Candidate"
2005-2007; 2013; 2020	Wild 'n Out	Cast Member	Season 1-5, 15
2006	Free Ride	Deeta the Waitress	Episode: "Up the Aunty"
2007	The L Word	Student #1	Episode: "Livin' La Vida Loca"
2007	My Name Is Earl	Female Indian Friend	Episode: "Kept a Guy Locked in a Truck"
2007	Carpoolers	Barista	Episode: "Down for the Count"
2007	Weeds	Bank Teller	Episode: "Protection"
2011	Childrens Hospital	Nidhi	Episode: "Frankfurters. Allman Brothers. Death. Frankfurters"
2015	The McCarthys	Barista	Episode: "Cutting the Cord" & "End Games"
2018	Will & Grace	Trish	Episode: "Sweatshop Annie & The Annoying Baby Shower"
2019	Abby's	Customer #2	Episode: "Backup"
2019	The Dead Sullivan Show	Guest/Poet	Episode: "Tim Tipton's "Rhyme Without Reason" 003"
