= Michael Muhammad Knight =

American novelist

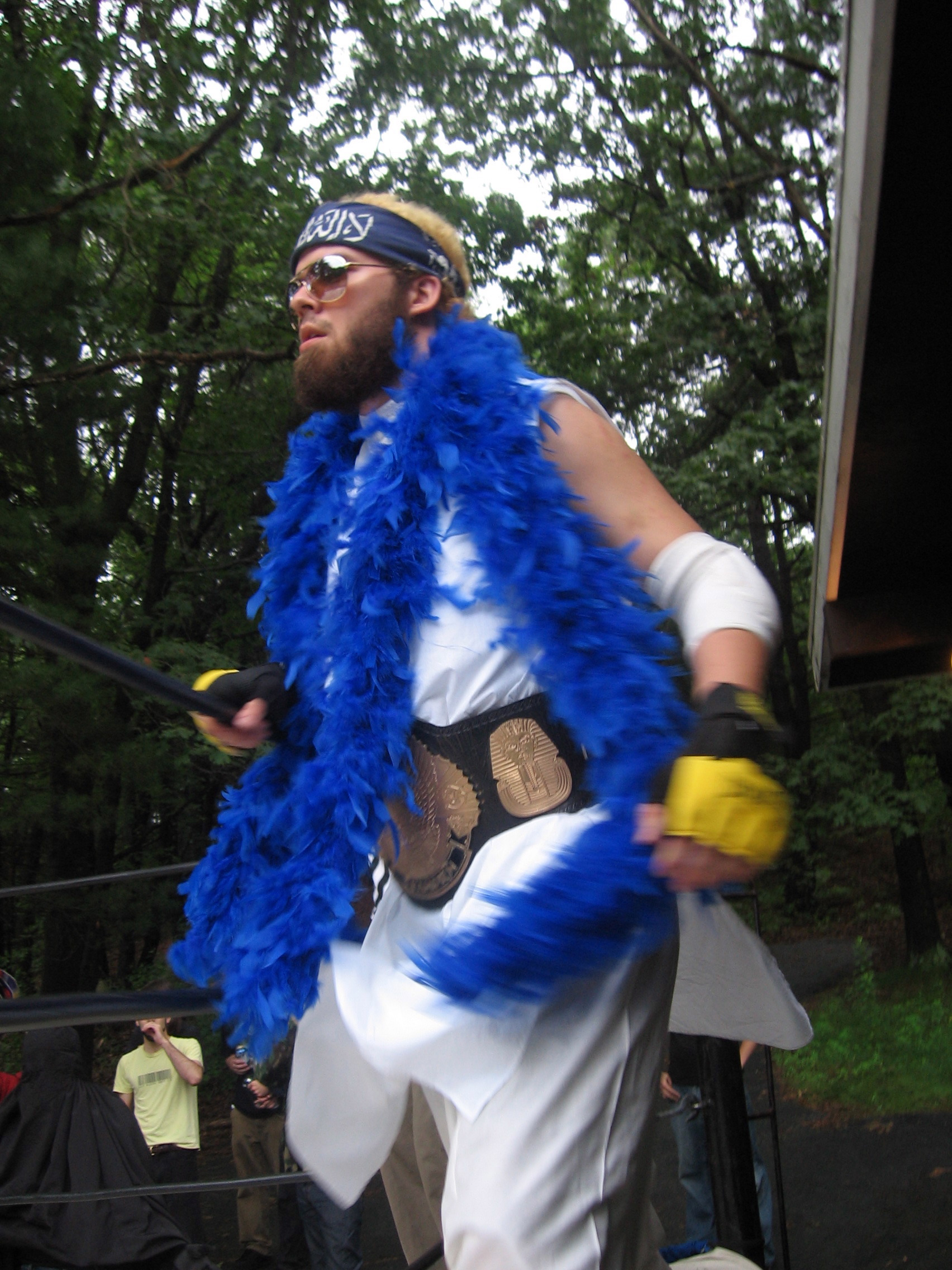
- Knight entering the wrestling ring for his fight against "Ibrahim Hooper"
- Born: 1977 (age 48–49)
- Education: Harvard University (MTS); University of North Carolina at Chapel Hill (PhD)
- Occupations: author; scholar

Michael Muhammad Knight (born 1977) is an American author, scholar, and convert to Islam. His writings are popular among American Muslim youth. The San Francisco Chronicle described him as "one of the most necessary and, paradoxically enough, hopeful writers of Barack Obama's America," while The Guardian has described him as "the Hunter S. Thompson of Islamic literature," and his non-fiction work exemplifies the principles of gonzo journalism. Publishers Weekly describes him as "Islam's gonzo experimentalist." Within the American Muslim community, he has earned a reputation as an ostentatious cultural provocateur.

He obtained a Master of Theological Studies degree from Harvard University in 2011 and received his Ph.D. in Islamic studies from the University of North Carolina at Chapel Hill in 2016. As of 2022 Knight was an associate professor of religion and cultural studies in the Department of Philosophy at the University of Central Florida.

== Biography ==
Knight grew up in Geneva, New York, raised by his mother in a Catholic family of Irish descent. Knight's first exposure to Islam came when he was 13 when he discovered Malcolm X through the lyrics of the hip-hop band, Public Enemy. After reading Alex Haley's The Autobiography of Malcolm X at 15, Knight's study of Islam intensified and he converted to Islam. It was also at 15 that Knight met his father, Wesley Unger, for the first time since he was two years old; when Knight informed Unger that he was Muslim, Unger told Knight that he was a white supremacist. At 17, Knight traveled to Islamabad, Pakistan, to study Islam at Faisal Mosque. He came close to making the decision to abandon this course of study to join the war against Russian rule in Chechnya.

On August 2, 2009, he married Sadaf Khatri in San Jose, California.

== Books ==
In Winter 2002 Knight wrote The Taqwacores, which told the story of a fictitious group of Muslim punk-rockers living in Buffalo, New York. Knight originally self-published the novel as a spiral-bound photocopy and gave it away for free. The book was later picked up for distribution by Alternative Tentacles, the punk record label founded by Jello Biafra. An encounter with Peter Lamborn Wilson led to The Taqwacores being published by Autonomedia in 2004.

The Taqwacores was intended as Knight's farewell to Islam, but encouragement from readers caused Knight to reconsider his relationship to the faith. The novel has since inspired the start of an actual taqwacore scene, including bands such as the Kominas, Vote Hezbollah, and Secret Trial Five. Carl W. Ernst, specialist in Islamic studies at UNC, called The Taqwacores a "Catcher in the Rye for young Muslims."

Knight's tenth book, Why I am a Salafi was released in 2015 by Soft Skull/Counterpoint. The book begins after Knight's ayahuasca vision in Tripping with Allah, visiting a mosque in Los Angeles and performing conventional Muslim prayer while still feeling ayahuasca's effects. The book then becomes a critical reflection on issues of scriptural interpretation, traditionalism and religious revivalism, and the Salafi movement to which Knight converted as a teenager. Publishers Weekly named the book one of its "Best Books of 2015."

Knight's eleventh book, Magic in Islam was released in 2016 by Tarcher/Penguin Books. Magic in Islam examines traditions such as astrology, Hermeticism, amulets and talismans as practiced in Islamic contexts, with focus on deconstructing boundaries between Islam and other religions, as well as the divisions between magic and religion at large. In the journal Correspondences, Kurosh Amoui describes the work as a reflection of Knight's "fascinated with fringe and marginalized narratives of Islam" (he quotes Knight as wondering whether “this book should just be called Weird Shit in Islam"), and identifies its main point as showcasing and proving that "Islams (plural) 'other' than the orthodox and the mainstream also exist or are possible to exist". Knight sees magic, along with religion, as victims of "‘advanced’ scientific nations" which invaded and colonized "magical peoples who had failed [in the minds of the colonialists] to properly develop”.

- The Taqwacores (2002)
- Blue-Eyed Devil (2007)
- The Five Percenters (2007)
- Osama Van Halen (2009)
- Impossible Man (2009)
- Journey to the End of Islam (2009)
- Why I Am a Five Percenter (2011)
- William S. Burroughs vs. the Qur'an (2012)
- Tripping with Allah: Islam, Drugs, and Writing (2013)
- Why I am a Salafi (2015)
- Magic in Islam (2016)
- Muhammad: Forty Introductions (2019)
- Muhammad's Body: Baraka Networks and the Prophetic Assemblage (2020)
- Metaphysical Africa: Truth and Blackness in the Ansaru Allah Community (2020)
- Sufi Deleuze (2023)
- Who is Muhammad? (2023)
- The Supreme Wisdom Lessons; A Scripture of American Islam (2025)

== See also ==
- Anarchism and Islam
- Liberal Muslim movements
