= Al-Thawra (band) =

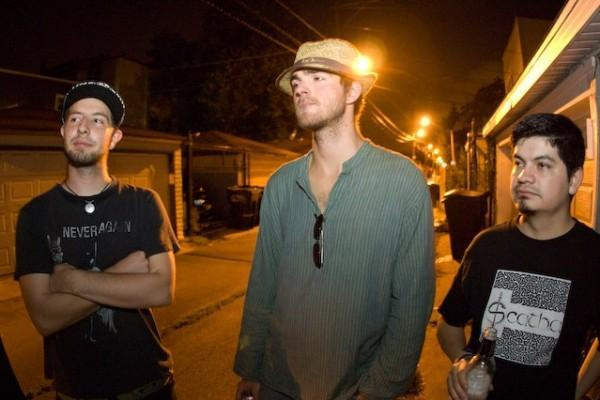

Background information
- Origin: (United States) Chicago, Illinois, U.S.
- Genres: Crust punk, taqwacore, doom metal, sludge metal
- Years active: 2006–present
- Members: Marwan Kamel; Micah Bezold; Mario Salazar
- Past members: Sahar Salameh
- Website: Al-Thawra on Myspace

Al-Thawra (Arabic: الثورة, meaning "The Revolution") is an experimental metal punk band with rhythms and modes that draw heavily on Middle Eastern influences. Band member Marwan Kemal describes a "third identity" between the "false dichotomy of East and West", pointing out that "in the Middle East, I'm still always 'the American kid'". Kemal grew up in Chicago—the band's bassist Mario Salazar is Mexican, and Sahar Salameh joined the band as a vocalist when she was 16 years old. Kamel's father is Syrian, but his mother was raised Catholic—he says he is "more influenced by the mystical paths in Islam. Like Sufism." The Islamic Monthly describes the band as challenging "mainstream Arab and Muslim 'Americaness'" Their musical genre has various been described as taqwacore and raïcore. (Raïcore is a genre that blends traditional Algerian folk music with punk rock.)
