= The Kominas =

Punk-rock band

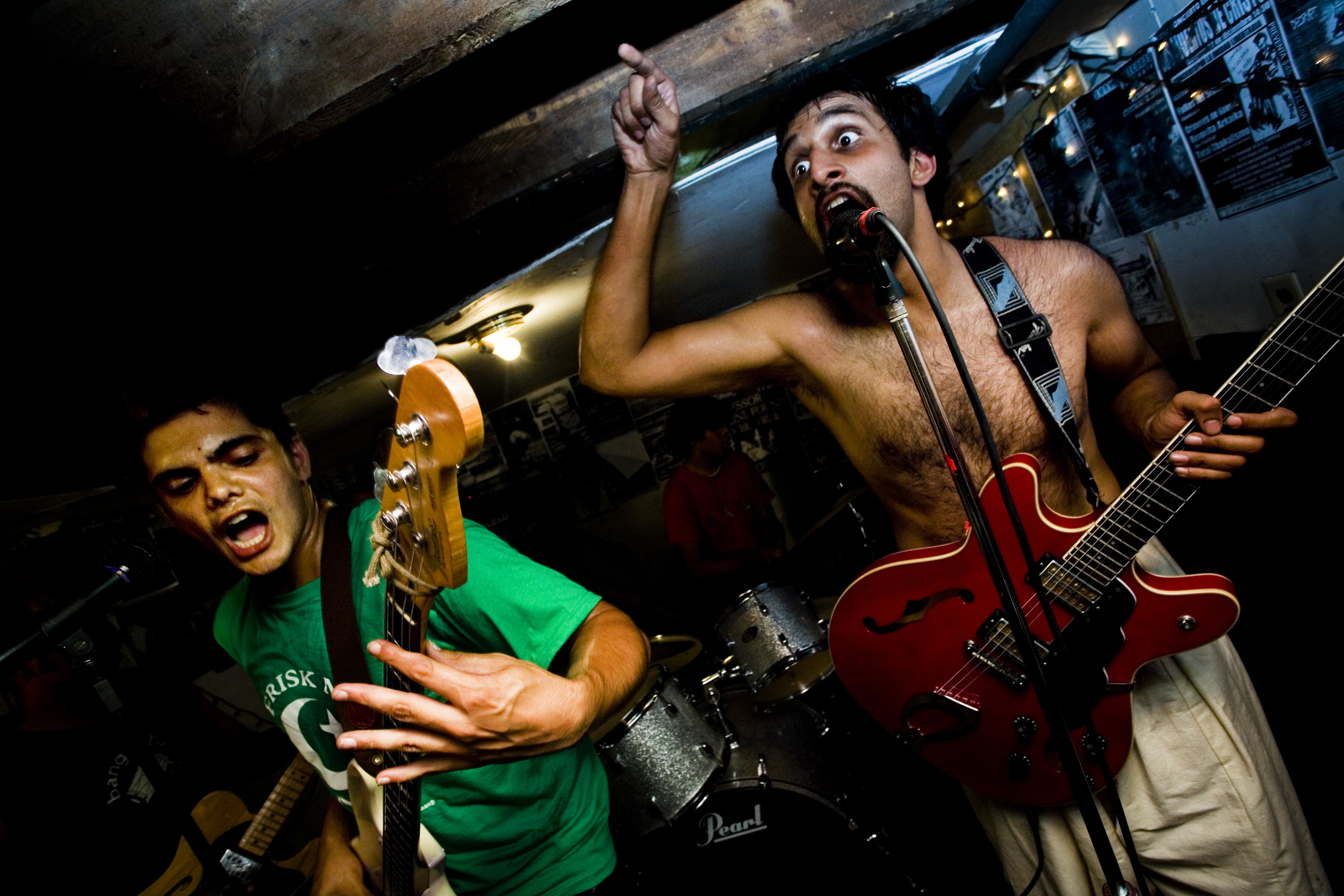

Background information
- Origin: Worcester, Massachusetts, United States
- Genres: Punk rock; funk rock; taqwacore; alternative rock
- Years active: 2005–present
- Label: Independent
- Members: Basim Usmani; Shahjehan Khan; Karna Ray; Hassan Ali Malik
- Past members: Arjun Ray; Imran Ali Malik; Abdullah Saeed

The Kominas are a punk rock band formed in 2005 by two Pakistani-Americans from Worcester, Massachusetts. In over ten years, the band has experienced a number of line-up changes and self-released albums.

== Musical style ==
Their dance-oriented sound characteristically blends 1977 punk stylings, with influences from psychedelic rock from around the world (like Turkey and Iran), Punjabi folk music, surf rock, reggae, disco, and dub. Their songs are often self-referential and situational, often challenging listeners to re-evaluate their assumptions of what it means to be American, or Muslim, or punk.

== History ==
In 2005, with the release of just two songs on the internet website MySpace, The Kominas, which is Urdu for "scoundrel" found themselves subjects of national news pieces and film and radio documentaries. Initially self-labeled as Bollywood Punk, and "post-colonial-punk" the band adopted the label "Taqwacore", in reference to a book called The Taqwacores by American novelist Michael Muhammad Knight, which imagines what a would-be American Muslim Punk scene would look like. This connection quickly fascinated American and International Media, which led to much being written about this unique example of life-imitating-art, and many international tours with the author. Many fans of this phenomenon felt that this was a necessary complicating counter-narrative to a simplistic and largely Islamophobic post-9/11 American media landscape.

Vocalist and bassist Basim Usmani and guitarist Shahjehan Khan first met at the Wayland Mosque in Boston, and then, again at the University of Massachusetts, Lowell. Usmani and Khan connected with guitarist Sunny Ali (who was in two previous bands PoPo and Sunny Ali and The Kid) and drummer Karna Ray. The band released its first album Wild Nights at Guantanamo Bay in 2008.

They came to be renown in South Asia from songs they released in Punjabi, Urdu, and Hindi. Their filmed BBC session where the band covered Bollywood classic "Choli Ke Peeche Kya Hai" especially got the band much positive attention from the Southern Asian and Punjabi peoples, both native and abroad.

In the 2010 NBC News story titled: Muslim-Hindu punk rock bands push buttons the Kominas are profiled as a band ruffling feathers of more traditional followers of Islam where music is seen as "Haram" or forbidden. In addition, some of the subjects the music of the Kominas touches on including women's rights and homosexuality also challenge conservative Islamic tradition and law. In a piece also written in 2010 for MetroWest Daily News, Imam Talal Eid, the executive director of the Islamic Institute of Boston, was quoted as saying that some traditional Muslims may object to such music [in reference to the Kominas] because they focus on its sexual attraction rather than its use for spiritual enjoyment.

One of their biggest hits is the song "Tunnnnnn", which is a re-interpretation of a classic reggae song (also covered by the punk band The Clash); Willie Williams' "Armagideon Time". The lyrics of "Tunnnnnn" are a mashup of English, Urdu, and Punjabi. Its lyrics proclaim (in Urdu): "We will only drink what they drink in Iraq! We will only drink what they drink in Karbala!", touching upon the subject of the horrific reality of warfare and the bombs which were dropped on those places. "Tunnnnnn" was an instant hit with both Kominas fans and newcomers alike.

With the self-titled release "Kominas" in 2012, the band has adopted the more Americana rock elements grunge and garage rock in their style and moved away from writing about Muslim-centric issues. From 2009–2012 the band toured extensively around America, Canada, and Europe. However, since 2012, the band's output has only been mostly daily missives on their Facebook page, which is more often than not, a commentary on the daily politics of race and religion.

In 2015, the band released their second full album titled "Stereotype" that took the band in a more traditional punk rockabilly direction. With singles such as: "If you see something, say something" maintaining the band's seminal social justice ethos and message.

The 2021 television series "We Are Lady Parts", written and directed by Nida Manzoor, used the song title "Ain’t No One Gonna Honour Kill My Sister But Me," pulled without permission from or attribution to The Kominas's track "No One Gonna Honor Kill My Baby (but me)" from their eponymous 2011 album.

== Political activism ==
The Kominas use a variety of ways to identify themselves to their Pakistani heritage. For example, they use the word “brown” on Twitter to evoke their racial meanings. The word is used as an identifier of the people of South Asian and Pakistani origins. It connects them to their heritage and to other similar brands and people.

The Taqwacore label was another way the Kominas identified themselves. While Taqwacore consists mainly of Islamic punk rockers, bands like The Kominas don’t like how the religious aspect of the label is what people focus on. The band is just as much about the politics of what Taqwacore is. It is about promoting their heritage in a new and different way: through punk rock and through social media. The Kominas and the label Taqwacore brings together people despite the distance that may or may not be between them. They are united through their identity of being “brown,” their love of punk rock, and/or their religious affiliations.

The Kominas’ songs and lyrics have a political aspect. They are meant to cause a change in a predominantly white culture. They wish to create safe spaces for people of color listening to their music.

In an interview from 2017 for Philadelphia based radio station WXPN guitarist Shahjehan Khan is questioned about being a political band means: “This idea of being a political band.. what does that mean? Your art is gonna be about your life. And if it’s good and honest, you’re gonna talk about your identity. It’s not political, it’s just what it is.”

In 2020 and 2021 the Kominas held several online fundraisers to benefit the Farmer's Protests in Punjab, India.

== Discography ==
2008 - "Wild Nights in Guantanamo Bay" (Writing & Composition: Shahjehan Khan / Basim Usmani / Arjun Ray / Karna Ray ~ Production: Dana Chisholm Wellspring Sound in Acton, MA; The New England Institute of Art Brookline, MA; DChizzle Studios Lexington, MA)

2010 - "Escape to Blackout Beach" (Writing & Composition: Basim Usmani / Imran Ali Malik / Shahjehan Khan ~ Production: Sevan Minassian at New Alliance Studio)

2011 - "Kominas" (Writing & Composition: Imran Ali Malik / Basim Usmani / Hassan Ali Malik / Abdullah Saeed ~ Produced: Sevan Minassian at New Alliance Studio)

2015 - "Stereotype" (Writing & Composition: Basim Usmani / Hassan Ali Malik / Karna Ray / Shahjehan Khan ~ Production: Sevan Minassian, Steve Roche, and Haris Usmani ~ Recorded at New Alliance Studios in Cambridge, Massachusetts & Permanent Hearing Studios in Philadelphia, PA ~ Mastered by Nick Zampiello at New Alliance Mastering in Cambridge, Massachusetts)

2017 - "No Fun" (single)

2019 - "The Systems are Down"
