= Greektown =

Neighborhood populated by Greek immigrants

Greektown is a general name for an ethnic enclave populated primarily by Greeks or people of Greek ancestry, usually in an urban neighborhood.

== History ==
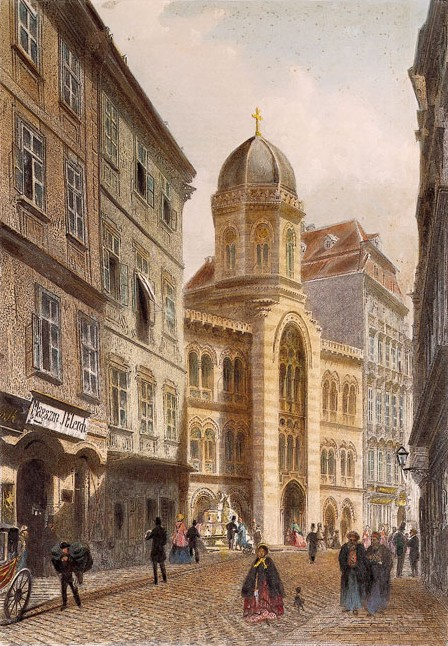
The Holy Trinity Greek Orthodox Greek Church in the Greek quarter in Vienna, late 19th century

The oldest Greek dominated neighborhood outside of Greece were probably the Fener in Istanbul, or the Ash Shatibi in Alexandria.

In Vienna, for many centuries, the Griechenviertel (Greek quarter) existed in the Innere Stadt (inner town). Later the Greek community moved to other newer quarters. A traditional Austrian restaurant there is called Griechenbeisl (Greek tavern) and a street Griechengasse (Greek lane).

Beloiannisz is a village in Fejér county, Hungary. It was founded by Communist Greek refugees who left Greece after the civil war, and was named after Nikos Beloyannis (Beloiannisz is the Hungarian spelling of his name).

Yaghdan, is a village in the Lori Province of Armenia. It has a majority of Greeks. The Alaverdi province in Armenia is mainly inhabited by ethnic Armenians with a minor Greek community that was once considered the largest in Armenia. The Greeks in Armenia speak the Pontic dialect and they are fluent in both Armenian and Russian. The Madan neighbourhood of Alaverdi used to have a large Greek community during the Soviet period.

== Greektowns by location ==
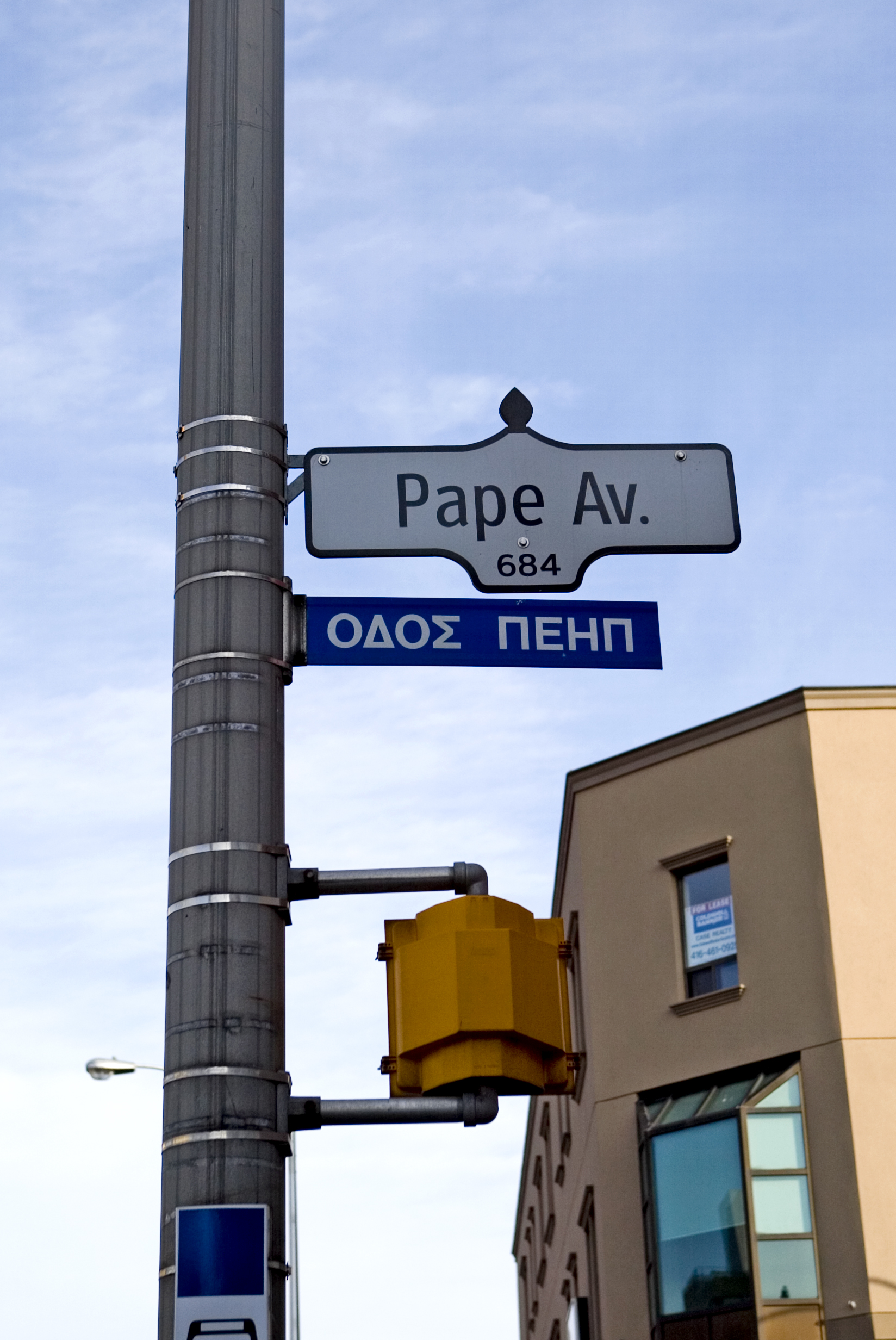
Street name in Greektown, Toronto

=== In Canada ===
- Greektown, Montreal, Quebec
  - Park Avenue, Montreal, Quebec
  - Park Extension, Montreal, Quebec
  - Chomedey, Laval, Quebec
- Greektown, Toronto, Ontario
- Greektown, Vancouver, British Columbia

The following pages provide some history regarding certain Greek communities in Canada.

- Greek Canadians
  - Greeks of Toronto
    - 1918 Toronto anti-Greek riot

=== In the United States ===
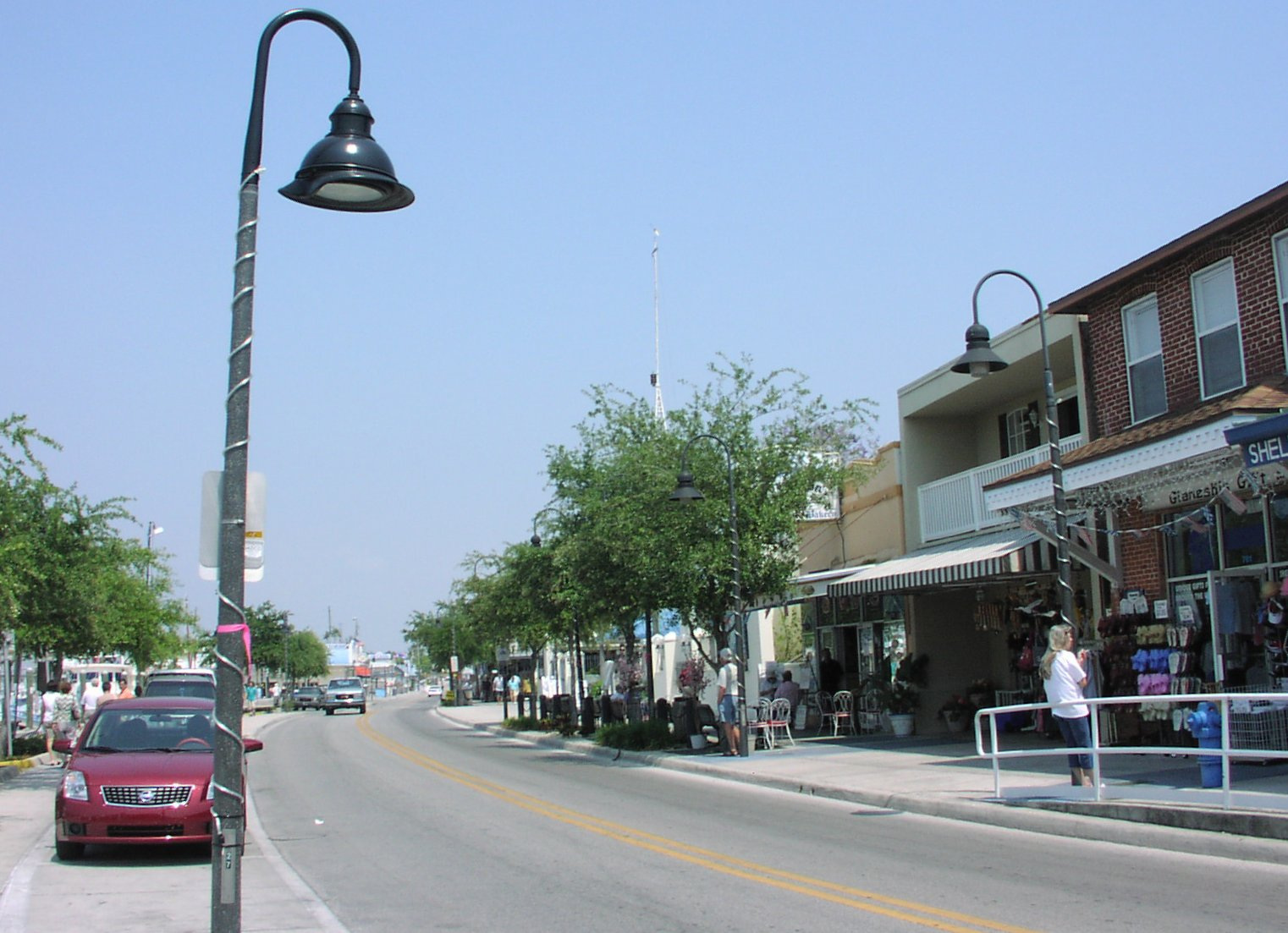
Dodecanese Avenue in Tarpon Springs, Florida

A typical housing pattern found in United States' Greektowns is to buy a multiple story dwelling, move into the lower floor and rent the upper floors to other Greeks.

The largest Greek community in the USA is located in Queens, NY.

- Astoria, Queens, in New York City

List of officially designated Greektowns:

- Greektown, Chicago
- Greektown, Detroit
- Greektown, Baltimore
- Greektown, Tarpon Springs

List of communities with a large concentration of Greek communities:

- New England
  - Boston, Massachusetts
  - Lynn, Massachusetts
  - Lowell, Massachusetts
  - Manchester, New Hampshire
- New York
  - 8th avenue, Manhattan
  - Washington Heights, Manhattan
- Philadelphia
  - Philadelphia, Pennsylvania
  - Upper Darby, Pennsylvania

List of historic Greektowns:

- Pittsburgh, Pennsylvania
- Cleveland, Ohio
  - Campbell, Ohio
- Salt Lake City, Utah
- San Francisco, California
- Los Angeles, California

The following pages provide some history regarding certain Greek communities in the USA.

- Greek Americans
  - Greeks in Syracuse, New York
  - Greeks in Omaha, Nebraska
    - 1909 Omaha anti-Greek riot
  - History of the Greek Americans in Metro Detroit
- List of Greek Americans

=== In Australia ===
The term Greektown is not widely used in Australia, even in areas with comparatively high levels of Greek concentration. In the 1860s, a shanty town referred to as Greektown was established at Tambaroora near Bathurst in New South Wales.

List of communities with a large concentration of Greek communities:

- Melbourne
  - Greek Precinct, Melbourne on Lonsdale Street
  - Oakleigh, Victoria in the City of Monash
- Sydney
  - Little Greece in Marrickville, New South Wales
- Brisbane
  - Carindale, Queensland

The following pages provide some history regarding certain Greek communities in Australia.

- Greek Australians
  - Greeks of Melbourne

=== In the United Kingdom ===
Many Greeks reside in Wood Green, Harringay and Palmers Green, the latter harbouring the largest community of Greek-Cypriots outside Cyprus, resulting in these areas bearing local nicknames whereby the Green is replaced by Greek – as in Greek Lanes and Palmers Greek. Although in recent years, most of London's Greek and Greek-Cypriot population resides in Southgate.

Bayswater is also home to a substantial Greek community. The Saint Sophia Cathedral, situated on Moscow Road was built in 1882, and is a grade I listed building.

List of communities with a large concentration of Greek communities:

- Palmers Green in London

The following pages provide some history regarding certain Greek communities in the UK.

- Greeks in the United Kingdom

== See also ==
- Greek diaspora
- Ethnic enclave
