= Greek Canadians =

Ethnic group

Ελληνοκαναδοί
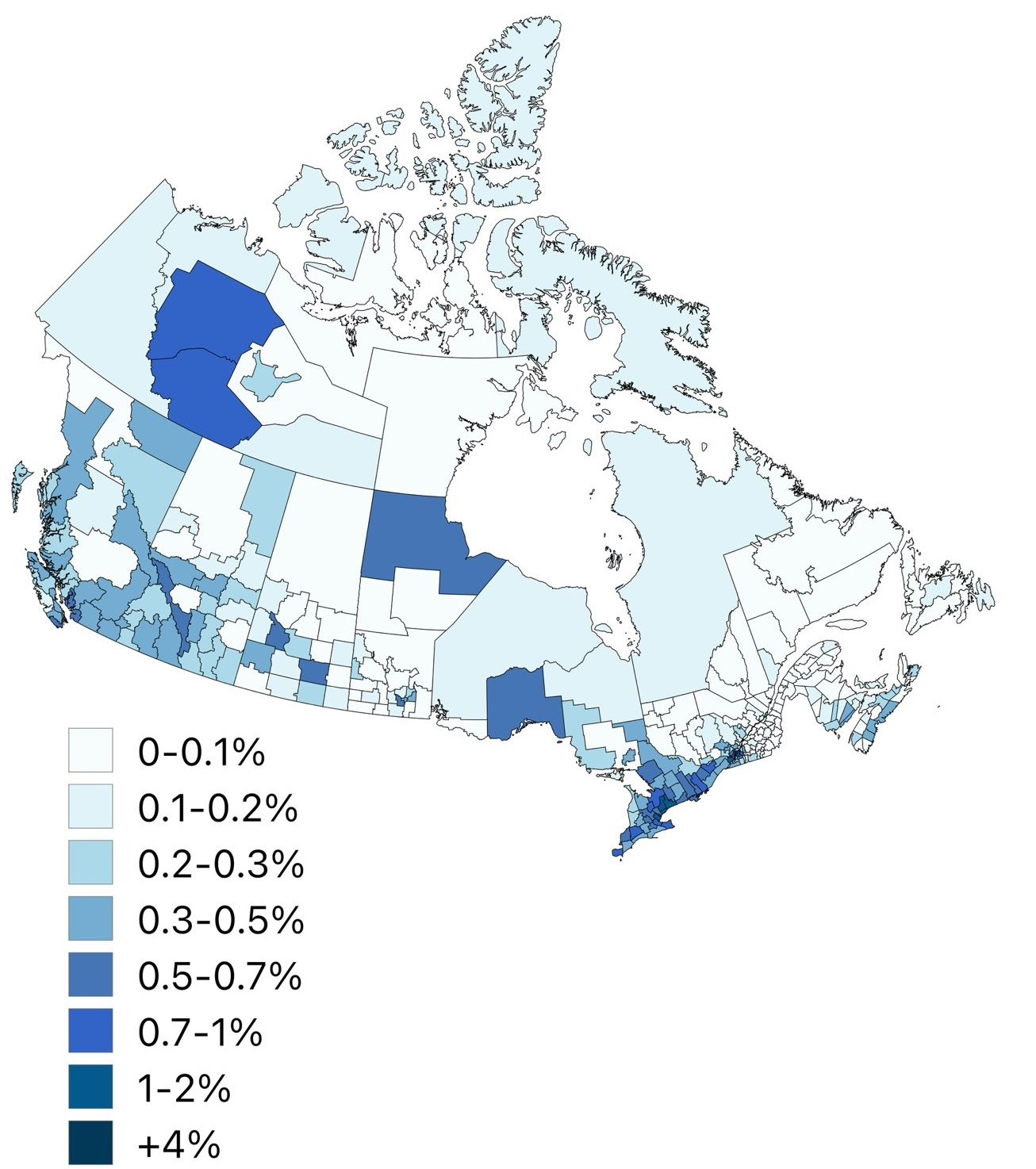
- Population distribution of Greek Canadians by census division, 2021 census

Total population
- 262,142 (by ancestry, 2021 Census)

Regions with significant populations
- Canada
- Ontario: ~130,000
- Quebec: ~70,000
- British Columbia: ~24,000
- Alberta: ~14,000

Languages
- English • French • Greek

Religion
- Predominantly Greek Orthodox Christianity

Greek Canadians (Greek: Ελληνοκαναδοί) are Canadian citizens who have full or partial Greek heritage or people who emigrated from Greece and reside in Canada. According to the 2021 Census, there were 262,140 Canadians who claimed Greek ancestry.

== Demographics ==
Provinces and territories with the highest population of Greek Canadians, according to 2016 Census:

Province or territory	Greek Canadians	Percentage	Born in Greece
Canada	271,410	0.79	
Ontario	148,555	1.12	36,575
Quebec	71,330	0.90	18,420
British Columbia	24,460	0.54	3,635
Alberta	15,025	0.38	2,005
Manitoba	4,130	0.33	820
Nova Scotia	3,360	0.37	510
Saskatchewan	2,880	0.27	605
New Brunswick	950	0.13	95
Newfoundland and Labrador	380	0.07	30
Prince Edward Island	175	0.13	15
Yukon	90	0.26	10
Northwest Territories	50	0.12	10
Nunavut	20	0.06	10

Census metropolitan agglomerations (CMAs) with the highest population of Greek Canadians, according to 2016 Census:

CMA		Greek Canadians	Percentage	Born in Greece
Toronto	Ontario	99,145	1.69	27,890
Montreal	Quebec	66,395	1.66	17,890
Vancouver	British Columbia	16,085	0.66	2,890
Ottawa - Gatineau	Ontario / Quebec	8,005	0.62	990
Hamilton	Ontario	6,940	0.94	1,620
Calgary	Alberta	6,770	0.49	940
London	Ontario	5,365	1.10	1,180
Edmonton	Alberta	5,015	0.39	655
Oshawa	Ontario	4,690	1.25	715
Kitchener - Cambridge - Waterloo	Ontario	3,885	0.75	580

Cities with the highest population of Greek Canadians, according to 2016 Census:

City	Province	Greek Canadians	Percentage	Born in Greece
Toronto	Ontario	57,420	2.13	19,240
Montreal	Quebec	29,060	1.75	9,150
Laval	Quebec	20,385	4.96	5,940
Mississauga	Ontario	7,490	1.05	
Ottawa	Ontario	6,975	0.76	
Markham	Ontario	6,215	1.90	
Calgary	Alberta	6,150	0.50	
Vancouver	British Columbia	5,760	0.93	
Vaughan	Ontario	5,065	1.67	
Hamilton	Ontario	5,030	0.95	

Ridings (federal electoral districts) with the highest percentage of Greek Canadians, according to 2016 Census:

Riding	Province	Greek Canadians	Percentage
Laval—Les Îles	Quebec	13,190	12.46
Toronto—Danforth	Ontario	7,655	7.26
Papineau	Quebec	5,490	5.01
Saint-Laurent	Quebec	4,795	4.92
Scarborough Centre	Ontario	4,945	4.48
Beaches—East York	Ontario	4,585	4.23
Ahuntsic-Cartierville	Quebec	4,695	4.18
Vimy	Quebec	4,335	4.07
Don Valley East	Ontario	3,785	4.06
Pierrefonds—Dollard	Quebec	3,680	3.43

=== Religion ===
Greek Canadian demography by religion
Religious group	2021 (Note: Religious breakdown proportions based on "Greek" ethnic or cultural origin responses on the 2021 census.)		2001 (Note: Religious breakdown proportions based on "Greek" ethnic or cultural origin responses on the 2001 census.)	
Religious group	Pop.	%	Pop.	%
Christianity	203,460	77.62%	197,290	91.72%
Islam	1,605	0.61%	535	0.25%
Judaism	1,480	0.56%	895	0.42%
Irreligion	54,355	20.74%	15,915	7.4%
Buddhism	230	0.09%	155	0.07%
Hinduism	85	0.03%	45	0.02%
Sikhism	55	0.02%	25	0.01%
Indigenous spirituality	55	0.02%	100	0.05%
Other	830	0.32%	140	0.07%
Total Greek Canadian population	252,135	100%	215,110	100%

Greek Canadian demography by Christian sects
Religious group	2021		2001	
Religious group	Pop.	%	Pop.	%
Catholic	25,640	12.6%	19,960	10.12%
Orthodox	155,175	76.27%	158,305	80.24%
Protestant	11,095	5.45%	15,530	7.87%
Other Christian	11,550	5.68%	3,495	1.77%
Total Greek Canadian Christian population	203,460	100%	197,290	100%

== List of notable Canadians of Greek ancestry ==
=== Academics ===
- Andreas Mandelis – expert on photonics, member of the Canadian Academy of Engineering; awarded the 2014 Killam Prize

==== Authors ====
- Pan Bouyoucas – finalist for the Governor General's Literary Award, 2001
- Tess Fragoulis – writer and educator
- Thomas King – writer and broadcaster presenter
- Dimitrios Roussopoulos – politician and activist

==== Professors ====
- Athanasios Asimakopulos – professor of Political Economy in the Department of Economics, McGill University
- Nick Bontis – DeGroote School of Business, McMaster University 3M National Teaching fellow
- André Gerolymatos – Hellenic Studies
- Dimitri Kitsikis – professor emeritus of History, fellow of the Royal Society of Canada
- Nikolas Kompridis – Philosophy
- Fotini Markopoulou-Kalamara – Physics
- John Mylopoulos – Computer Science
- Nikolaos Oikonomides – Byzantine history
- David N. Stamos – Philosophy
- Anastasios Venetsanopoulos – vice president of Research and Innovation at Ryerson University

=== Business and philanthropy ===
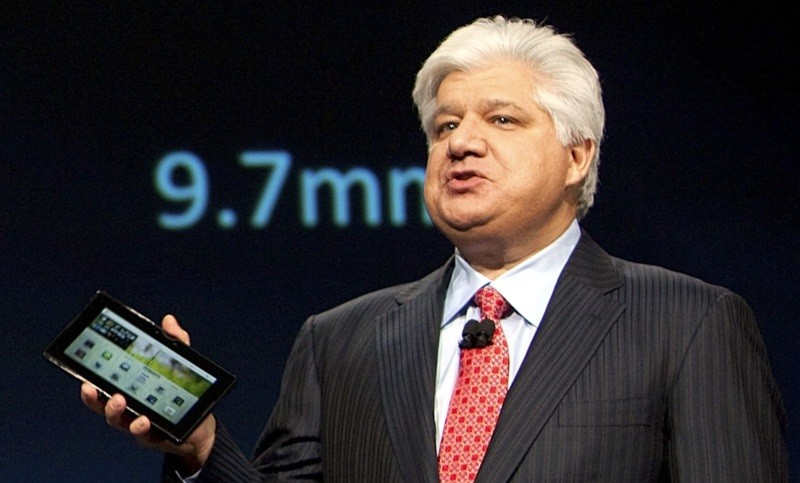
Mike Lazaridis, creator of BlackBerry

- Sophia Aggelonitis – businesswoman
- Jack Agrios – former director and executive member of the Edmonton Elks
- Andreas Apostolopoulos – real estate
- Steve Apostolopoulos – real estate
- Chris Giannou – war surgeon
- Sam Kolias – founder, chairman and CEO of Boardwalk REIT
- Mike Lazaridis – founder and co-CEO of Research In Motion (RIM), creator of BlackBerry
- Sam Panopoulos – chef and businessman best known for his invention of the Hawaiian pizza

=== Creatives ===
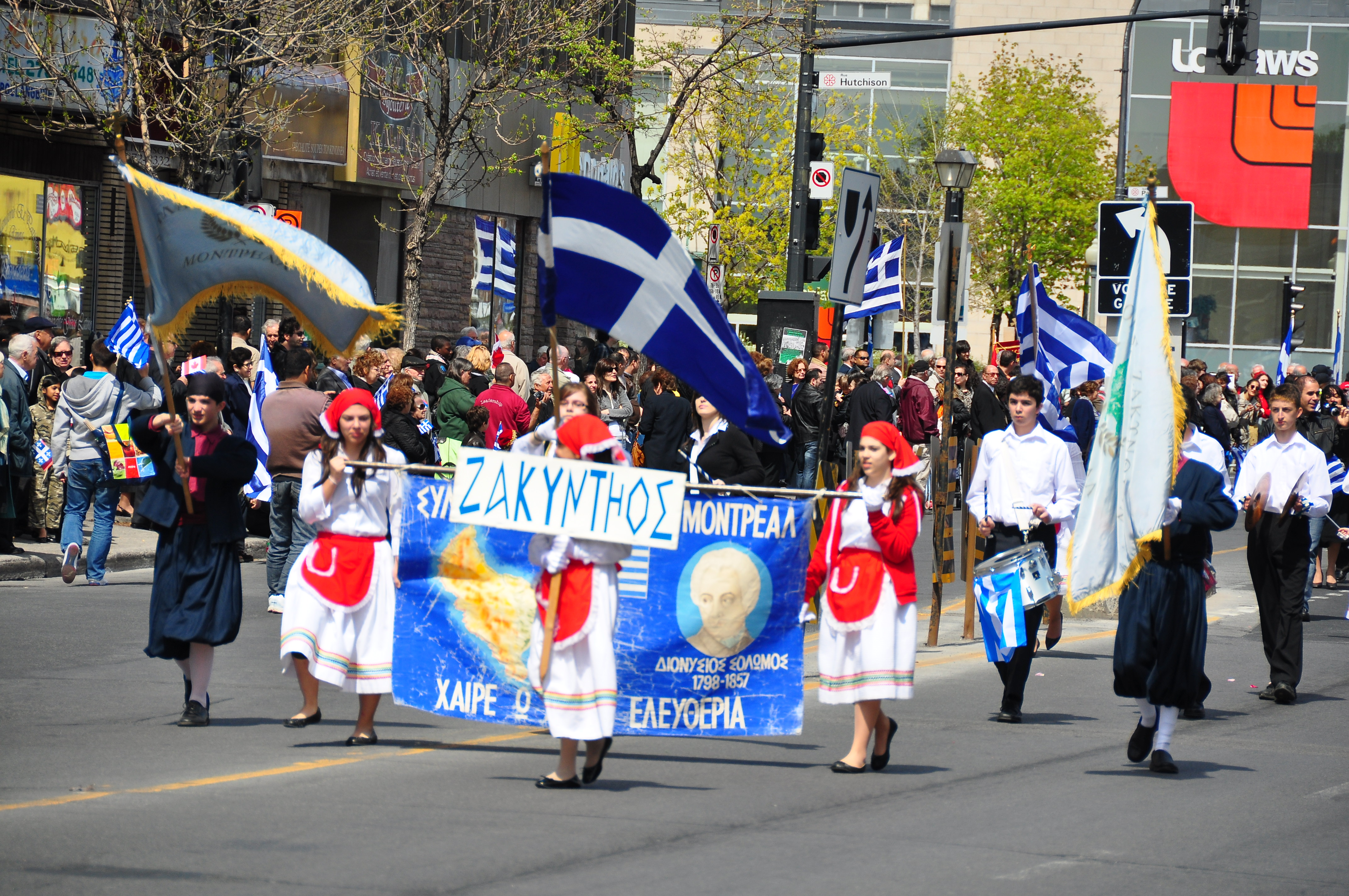
Canadians of Greek ancestry mark the independence of Greece in Montreal's Park Extension neighbourhood.

==== Artists ====
- Thalia Assuras – television journalist
- Eleonora Dimakos – model, actress, journalist and makeup artist
- Helen Lucas – artist
- Billy Mavreas – cartoonist
- Pythia – drag queen
- Paul Soulikias – artist painter
- Chrysanne Stathacos – multidisciplinary artist
- George Trakas – environmental sculptor

=== Sport ===
==== Athletics ====
- Nicolas Macrozonaris – 100m sprinter

==== Baseball ====
- Alex Anthopoulos – president of Baseball Operations for the Atlanta Braves, former Blue Jays general manager
- George Kottaras – Major League player
- Vickie Panos – player, All-American Girls Professional Baseball League in 1944

==== Basketball ====
- Ammanuel Diressa – player with Scarborough Shooting Stars of the Canadian Elite Basketball League
- Naz Mitrou-Long – NBA player, Utah Jazz and Indiana Pacers
- Elijah Mitrou-Long – player with PAOK of the Greek Basket League

==== Boxing ====
- Hercules Kyvelos – boxer

==== Chess ====
- Peter Biyiasas – chess grandmaster

==== Diving ====
- Alexandre Despatie – diver, Olympic silver medalist (Greek grandmother)

==== Fencing ====
- Joseph Polossifakis – sabre fencer, 2016 Olympian, Pan-Am Games medalist

==== Field hockey ====
- Ernie Cholakis – player

==== Figure skating ====
- Madeline Schizas

==== Football ====
- Stavros Katsantonis – CFL defensive back, Hamilton Tiger-Cats
- Dave Sapunjis – CFL all-star receiver, Calgary Stampeders

==== Ice hockey ====
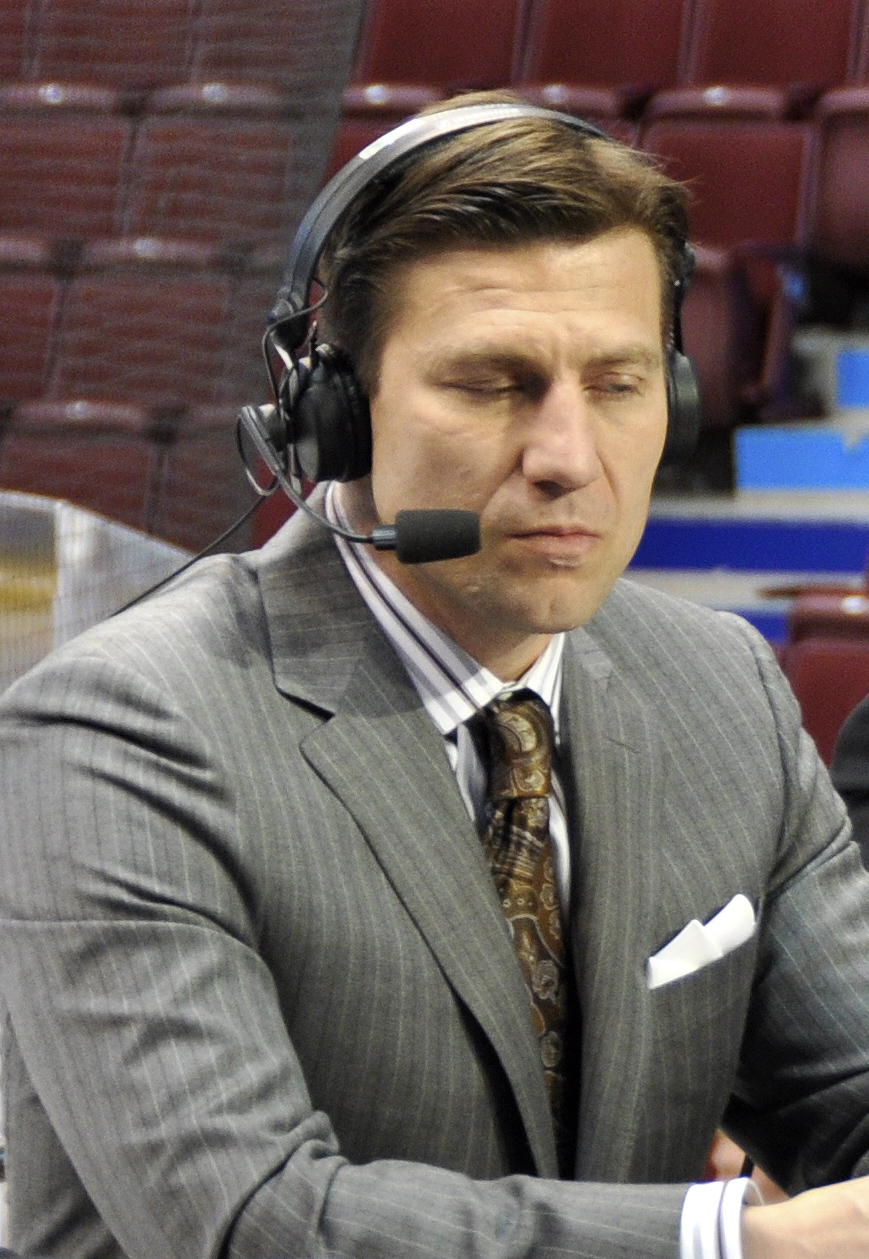
Nick Kypreos, former NHL player, Toronto Maple Leafs and New York Rangers

- Andreas Athanasiou – NHL player for the Chicago Blackhawks
- Steve Gatzos – former NHL player, Pittsburgh Penguins
- Tom Karalis – former AHL player
- Chris Kontos – former NHL player
- Chris Kotsopoulos — former NHL player, New York Rangers, Hartford Whalers, Toronto Maple Leafs, and Detroit Red Wings
- Tom Kostopoulos – former NHL player, Pittsburgh Penguins, Carolina Hurricanes, Montreal Canadiens and Calgary Flames
- Nick Kypreos – former NHL player, Toronto Maple Leafs and New York Rangers
- Christian Kyrou – NHL player for the Dallas Stars
- Jordan Kyrou – NHL player for the St. Louis Blues; gold medalist at the 2018 World Junior Championships
- Dave Nonis – former Canadian ice hockey defenceman; former general manager and executive of the National Hockey League's Vancouver Canucks and Toronto Maple Leafs
- José Théodore – former NHL player; Hart Memorial Trophy winner in 2002 with the Montreal Canadiens
- Carson Lambos - NHL Player for the Minnesota Wild

==== Mixed martial arts ====
- Smealinho Rama – light heavyweight
- Elias Theodorou – former UFC middleweight

==== Paralympics ====
- Marissa Papaconstantinou

==== Soccer ====
- Themi Antonoglou – player
- David Fronimadis – player
- Costa Iliadis – player, Toronto FC II
- Ilias Iliadis – player, FC Montana
- Stathis Kappos – player
- Jace Kotsopoulos – player
- John Limniatis – player
- James Pantemis – goalkeeper, CF Montréal
- Lucas Papaconstantinou – goalkeeper
- Nick Papadakis – player
- Peter Sarantopoulos – player
- Bobby Smyrniotis – coach, former player
- Kenny Stamatopolous – player, former Toronto FC and Kalamata
- Sarah Stratigakis – midfielder, Michigan Wolverines, Canadian Women's National Team
- Theo Zagar – player

==== Strength athletics ====
- Dominic Filiou – strongman

==== Water skiing ====
- George Athans – water-skier

==== Wrestling ====
- Bret Hart – former pro wrestler, multiple World Champion in the WWF and WCW; of Greek ancestry; mother is half Greek
- Owen Hart – former pro wrestler, WWE Intercontinental Champion, European Champion and Tag-Team Champion, brother of Bret
- Teddy Hart – pro wrestler, nephew of Owen and Bret
- Jim Korderas – former WWE referee, television commentator
- Natalya Neidhart – pro wrestler, former WWE Women's Champion, niece of Bret and Owen Hart
- Trish Stratus (aka Patricia Anne Stratigias) – former professional wrestler, seven time WWE Women's Champion, former WWE Hardcore Champion
- John Tolos – former professional wrestler and professional wrestling manager

=== Film, TV and stage ===
==== Actors and performers ====
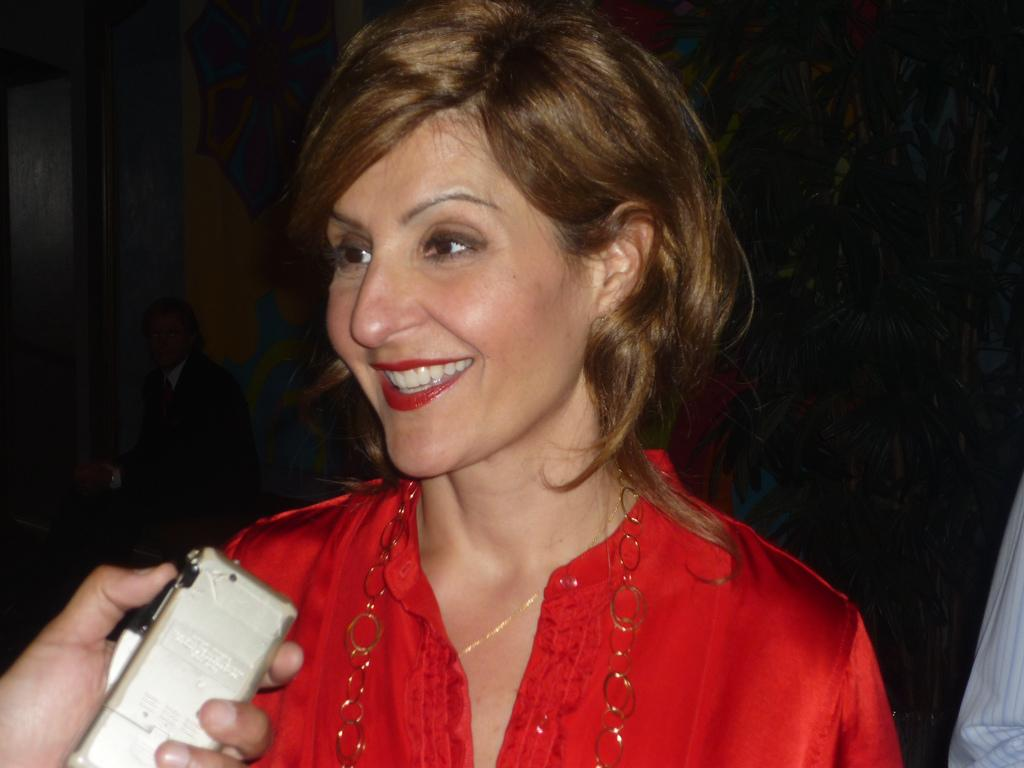
Nia Vardalos, actress, My Big Fat Greek Wedding

- Marie Avgeropoulos – actress, Tracers, Supernatural, Fringe, The 100
- Alex Carter – actor
- John Colicos – actor
- Chris Diamantopoulos – actor
- Vasilios Filippakis – actor
- Jordan Gavaris – actor
- John Ioannou – actor
- Demetrius Joyette – actor
- John Kapelos – actor
- Athena Karkanis – actress, The Border, Lost Girl, Low Winter Sun, The Lottery, Manifest
- Argiris Karras – actor
- Alex Karzis – actor, singer and musician
- Elias Koteas – actor, Crash
- Melissanthi Mahut – actress
- Natasha Negovanlis – actress and web host
- Alexandra Ordolis – actress
- Nikki Ponte – singer
- Cristine Prosperi – actress
- Daniel Samonas – actor
- Sofia Shinas – singer, actress, The Crow
- Tracy Spiridakos – actress, Being Human, Revolution, Chicago P.D.
- Venus Terzo – actress
- Elias Toufexis – actor
- Angelo Tsarouchas – comedian/actor It's all Greek to Me Comedy Show
- Nia Vardalos – actress, screenwriter, My Big Fat Greek Wedding
- Marie Wilson – actress, Days of Our Lives, General Hospital

==== Directors and producers ====
- Tony Asimakopoulos – documentary film director
- Stephano Barberis – music video director
- Constant Mentzas – filmmaker
- Watts – music producer, born Austin Garrick

==== Entertainers ====
- Ariana Chris – mezzo-soprano
- Christine Cushing – celebrity chef
- Anesti Danelis – comedian, musician
- Dini Dimakos – comedian/actor, Video on Trial, Love Court
- Katerine Duska – singer
- DVBBS – electronic duo, most famous for their joint international hit with Borgeous, "Tsunami"
- Hannah Georgas – singer/songwriter
- Theo Goutzinakis – musician
- Rex Harrington – ballet dancer
- Alex Karzis – actor, voiceover artist, musician and singer
- KO – musician
- Sid Krofft – puppeteer
- George Sapounidis – musician, troubadour, statistician, Sinophile; subject of documentary Chairman George
- Teresa Stratas (born 1938) – soprano OC; retired Canadian operatic soprano; known for her award-winning recording of Alban Berg's Lulu; born in Toronto, Ontario
- Angelo Tsarouchas – comedian/actor, It's all Greek to Me Comedy Show
- Phil X (born Phil Xenidis) – prolific session guitarist and Bon Jovi's guitarist
- Chris Yonge – rapper

==== Journalists and broadcasters ====
- Ernie Afaganis – retired CBC-TV Sports and Olympics anchor
- Thalia Assuras – anchor and reporter
- Vassy Kapelos — host, CBC News Network's Power & Politics, former Global News Ottawa bureau chief
- Athena King – newscaster on Naked News
- Steve Kouleas – sports anchor and reporter
- George Lagogianes – television personality, currently reporter and anchor for CP24; host of Auto Shop
- Nik Nanos – political commentator and founder of Nanos Research
- Ioanna Roumeliotis – CBC News reporter
- Lou Schizas – equities analyst
- George Stroumboulopoulos – host, CBC Newsworld's The Hour, former MuchMusic VJ
- Christina-Laia Vlahos – OMNI 1 presenter
- Antonia Zerbisias – Toronto Star columnist

=== Historical figures ===
==== Immigrants ====
- Ioánnis Fokás Juan de Fuca – first Greek-Canadian (1592)

==== Politicians ====
- Annie Koutrakis – Liberal MP for Vimy, Quebec
- Sophia Aggelonitis – former Liberal MPP for Hamilton Mountain
- Niki Ashton – NDP Member of Parliament for the electoral district of Churchill, Manitoba
- Eleni Bakopanos – former Liberal MP for Saint-Denis
- Staff Barootes – former Conservative senator
- Marie Bountrogianni – former Liberal MPP for Hamilton Mountain
- John Cannis – former Liberal MP for Scarborough Centre, 1993 to 2011
- Tony Clement – member of Parliament for Muskoka, and president of the Treasury Board
- Mary Fragedakis – Toronto city councillor for Ward 29, Toronto-Danforth
- Peter Fragiskatos – Liberal MP for London North Centre
- Philippe Gigantès – former Liberal senator
- Faith Goldy – right-wing political commentator, former Toronto mayoral candidate
- Leo Housakos – Conservative senator
- Maurine Karagianis – New Democratic Party of British Columbia MLA, former Esquimalt – municipal councillor, British Columbia
- Jim Karygiannis – Toronto city councillor
- Labi Kousoulis – Nova Scotia Liberal MLA for Halifax Citadel-Sable Island minister of Finance and Treasury Board, minister of Inclusive Economic Growth (formerly Business), and minister of Trade
- Emmanuella Lambropoulos – Liberal MP for Saint Laurent
- Costas Menegakis – former Conservative Party of Canada MP for Richmond Hill
- Pana Merchant – Liberal senator from Saskatchewan
- Christina Mitas – PC MPP for Scarborough Centre, 2018–present
- Constantine George Mitges – former PC MP, first Greek elected federally
- Nick Mantas – Toronto city councillor, Ward 22, Scarborough - Agincourt
- George Samis – former Ontario New Democratic Party MPP, first Greek elected to a Canadian legislature
- Christos Sirros – former Quebec Liberal MNA and provincial cabinet minister
- Gerry Sklavounos – Liberal member of the Québec National Assembly
- Dimitri Soudas – former communications director to the prime minister of Canada
- Diane Stratas – former Progressive Conservative MP for Scarborough Centre, 1979–1980
- Effie Triantafilopoulos – PC MPP for Oakville-North Burlington, 2018–present

==== Judiciary ====
- Justice Andromache Karakatsanis – Supreme Court of Canada, 2011–present
- Justice David Stratas – Federal Court of Appeal, 2009–present

==== Religious figures ====
- Nicholas Salamis – priest
- Christophoros (Rakintzakis) – bishop

==== Order of Canada recipients ====
- Teresa Stratas (born 1938) – soprano OC; retired Canadian operatic soprano; known for her award-winning recording of Alban Berg's Lulu; born in Toronto, Ontario

==== Order of Merit of the Police Forces recipients ====
- Peter Lambrinakos MOM – Canadian police and corporate security executive

== See also ==
- Canadian-Greek relations
- Greek Torontonians
- Canadian people of Greek descent
- Philhellenism
- 1918 Toronto anti-Greek riot
