= Greektown, Toronto =

Coordinates: 43°40′42.5″N 79°20′50″W

Greektown Γκρικτάουν (Greek) The Danforth Το Ντανφόρθ (Greek)
- Neighbourhood
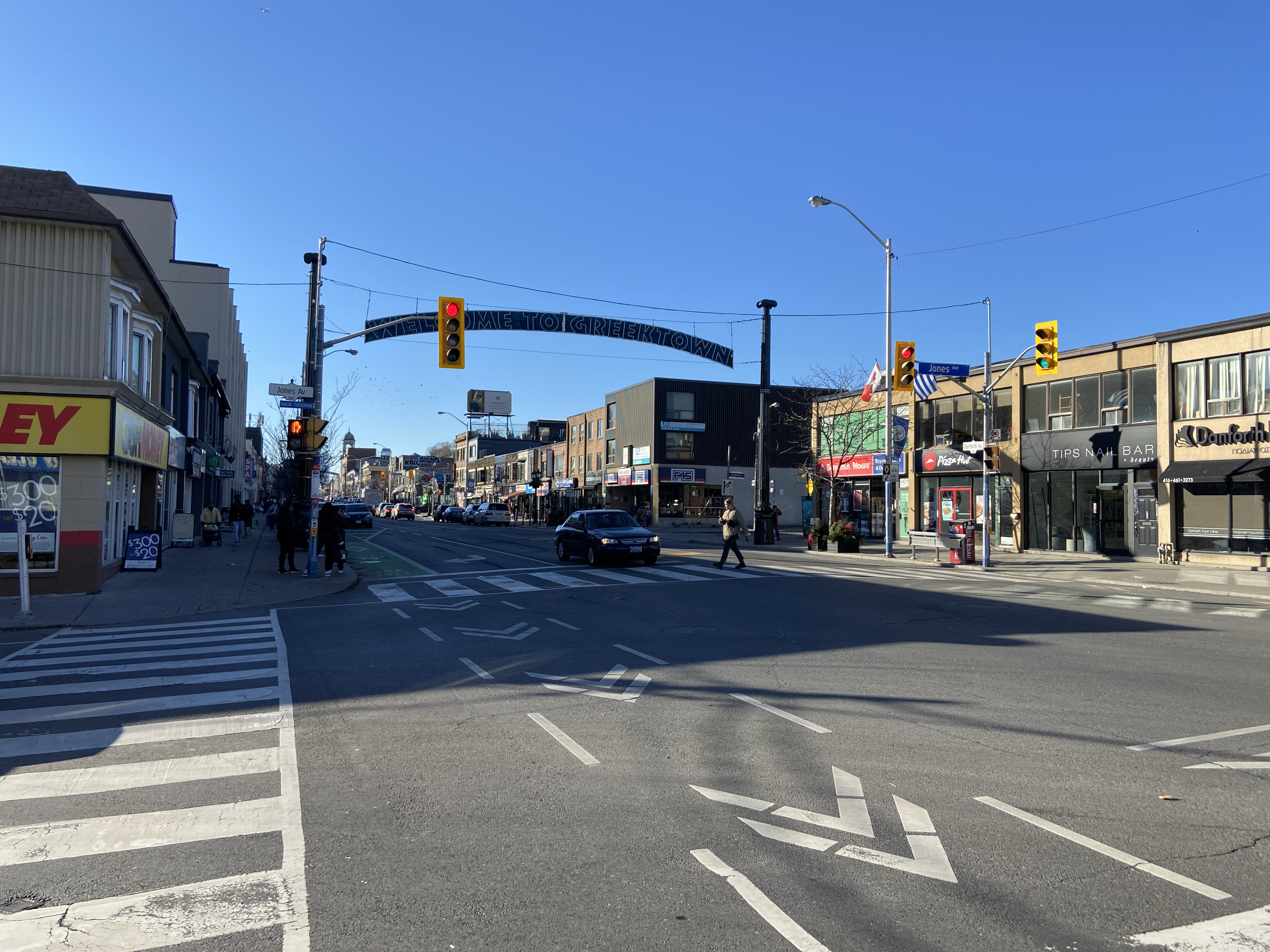
- View of Greektown at Jones Ave

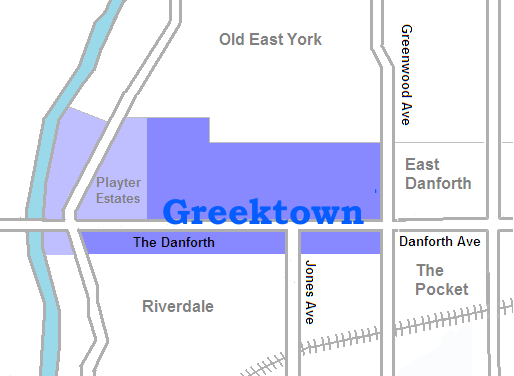
- Country: Canada
- Province: Ontario
- City: Toronto

Greektown, also known as The Danforth, is a commercial-residential neighbourhood and ethnic enclave in Toronto, Ontario, Canada. It is located on Danforth Avenue, between Chester Avenue and Dewhurst Boulevard, in east Toronto. Named after Asa Danforth, Jr., an American contractor who designed Queen Street and Kingston Road, the area is known for its architecture dating back to as early as 1910, and for its number of Greek restaurants and stores. The area was one of the major settlement areas of Greek immigrants to Toronto after World War I.

== History ==
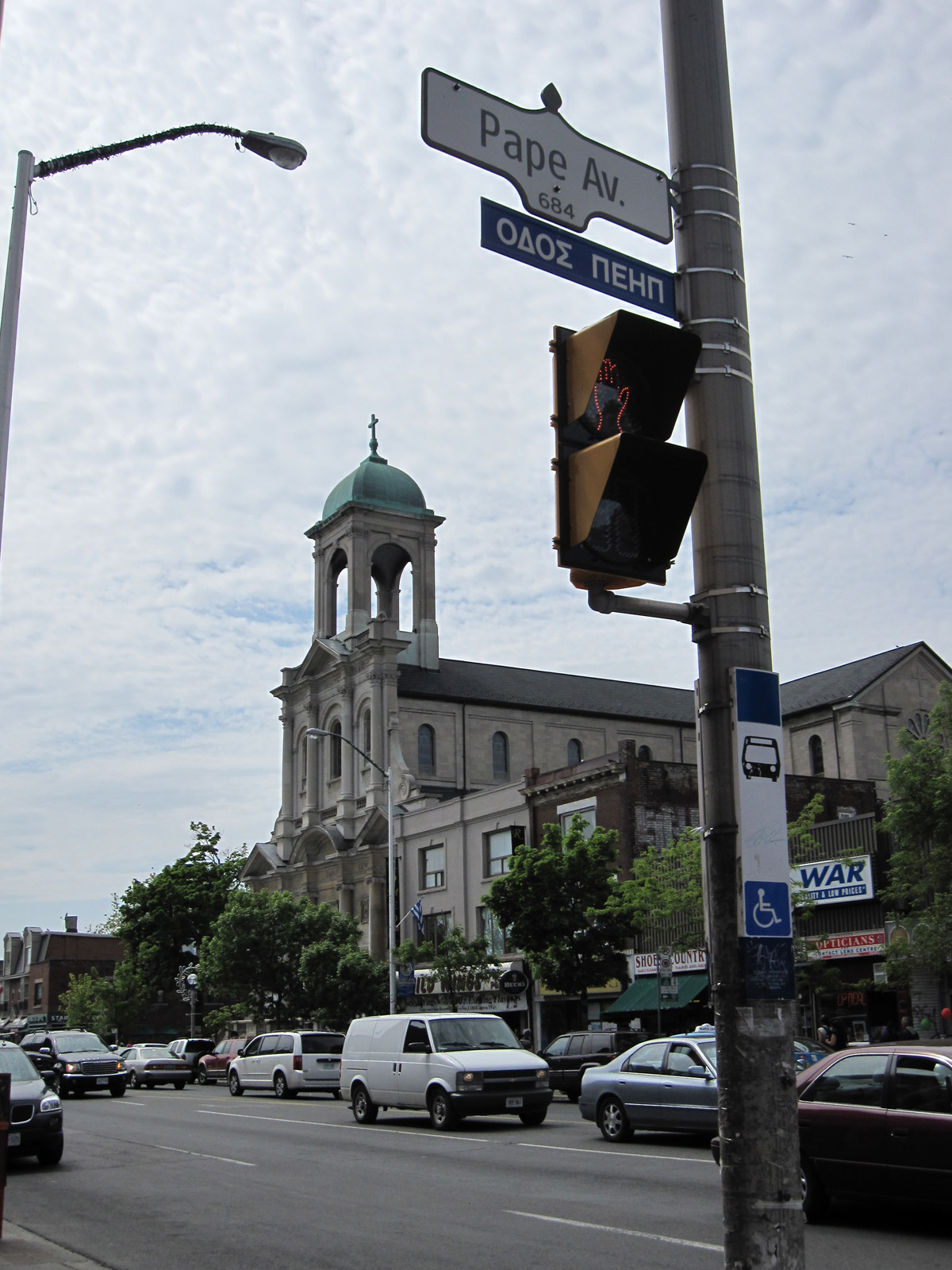
View of Greektown and the Church of the Holy Name on Danforth Avenue

Prior to World War II, Toronto's nascent Greek population of about 3,000 was concentrated in the area bounded by Yonge Street, Carlton Street, Church Street and what is now Dundas Street East. It was this area that was the focus of the 1918 Toronto anti-Greek riot. A sizeable Greek neighbourhood later emerged in the Bloor Street West area.

In the 1950s and 1960s, the Danforth saw an influx of European immigration (particularly from Italy and Greece), many of whom were fleeing political and economic unrest which culminated in the seizure of power by the Greek military junta of 1967–74. By 1960s, Toronto's Greek population numbered 12,500. However, during this time Greeks were but one of many ethnic groups on the Danforth, with Estonians, Lithuanians, Italians, Chinese, and Finnish immigrants also present in significant numbers. In the 1970s and 1980s the Danforth was regarded as the largest Greektown in North America. Columnists Warren Gerard and Christie Blatchford, writing in 1976, noted that the Danforth was sometimes referred to as "Little Athens" and that some 65,000 Greeks lived in the vicinity. English-language media began to excitedly cover the Greek restaurant and nightclub scene in the 1970s, highlighting bouzouki players and busy dance floors. Artistic and counter-cultural voices found a home in cafes like The Trojan Horse where exiled and local musicians and poets like Gwendolyn MacEwen would gather and perform. However, by the 1980s, the Toronto Star wrote that Greektown had become associated with "yuppies"..

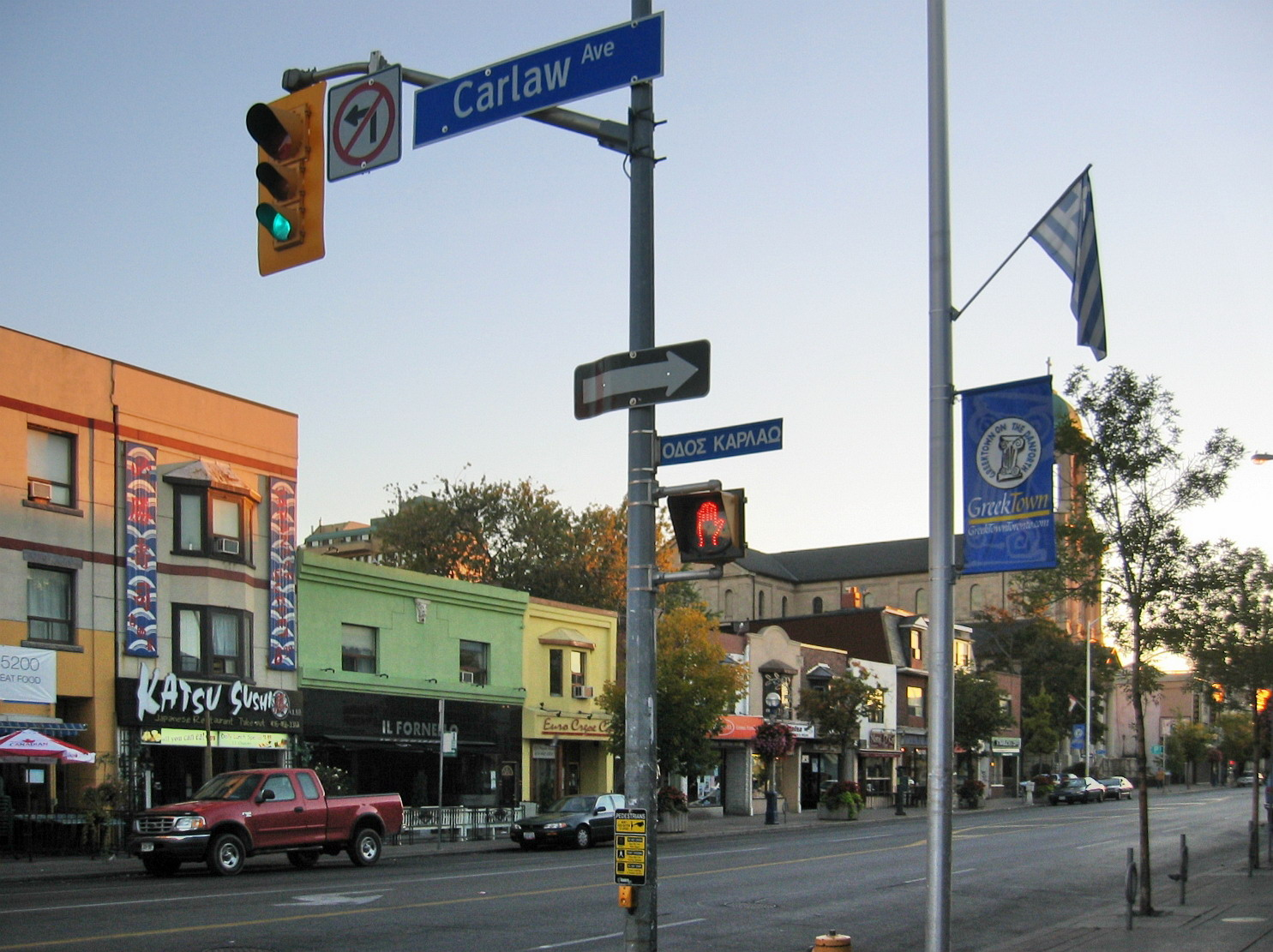
The Danforth has recently experienced a wave of gentrification.

In 1993, the BIA Board of Management's lobbying of City Hall paid off, and the BIA was officially renamed "GreekTown on the Danforth". More recently, the area has experienced a wave of gentrification as higher-priced restaurants and bars have moved in, as well as a public square (at Logan Avenue by Alexander the Great Parkette). Greektown on the Danforth boasts one of the highest concentrations of restaurants per kilometre in the world. The neighbourhood is home to local raconteur Tom Petkos, and is mentioned in the Barenaked Ladies song, "The Old Apartment", and by critically acclaimed author Joseph Assenza in his novel, "The History of John". Also, several scenes in the movie My Big Fat Greek Wedding were shot here, mentioned on free walking tours of the neighbourhood.

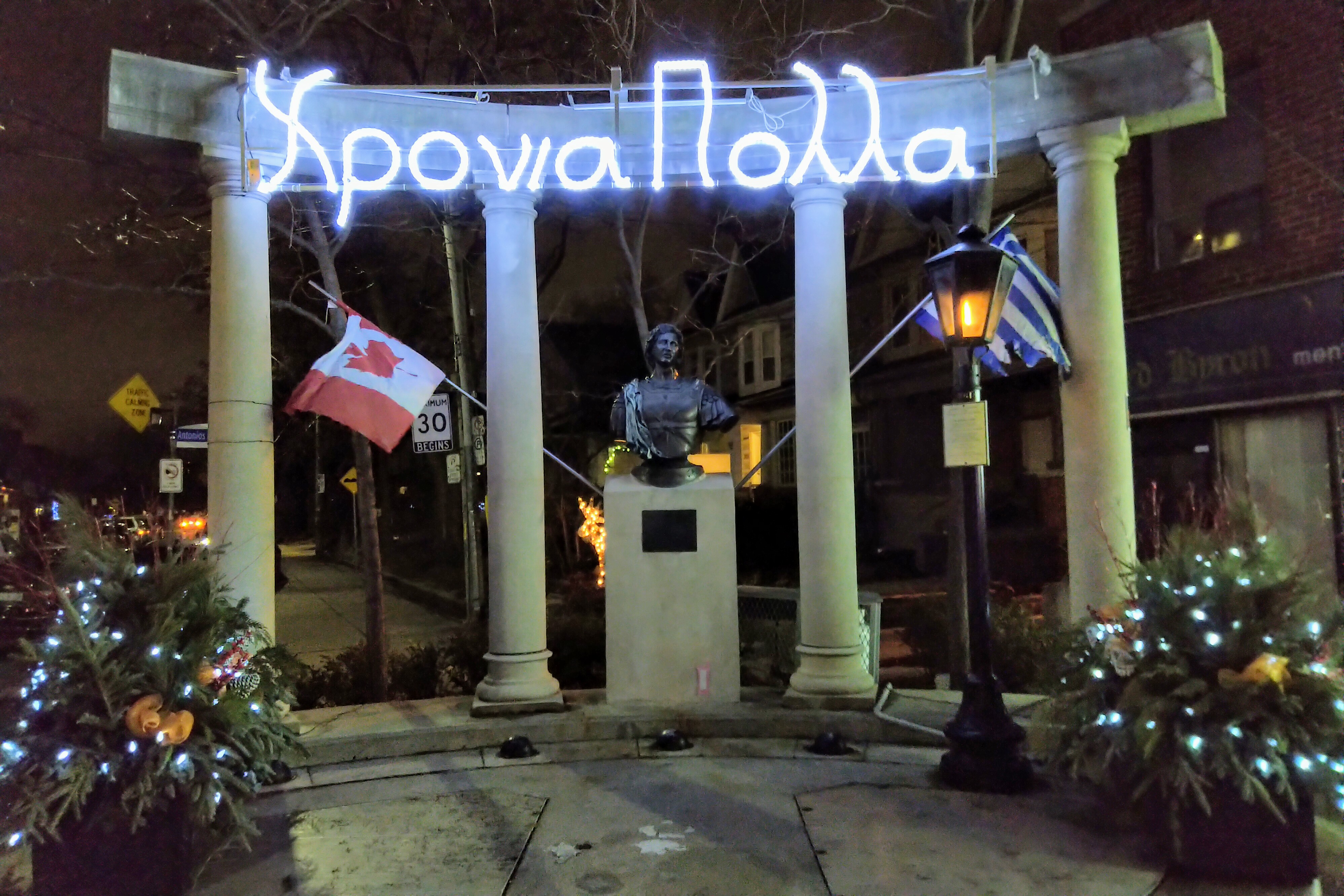
Alexander the Great Parkette at Christmas

Some parts of Greektown are still dominated by Canadians of Greek descent (Greek-Canadians). As of the 2016 federal census, Greeks still constitute one of the most significant ethnic groups in the Toronto—Danforth ward (in which Greektown is located) by population, at 4.5% of the total ethnic origins reported. Greek is the third most-commonly reported mother tongue and home language in the ward, behind English and Cantonese

On July 22, 2018, there was a mass shooting in Greektown that killed two and injured 13.

== Taste of the Danforth ==
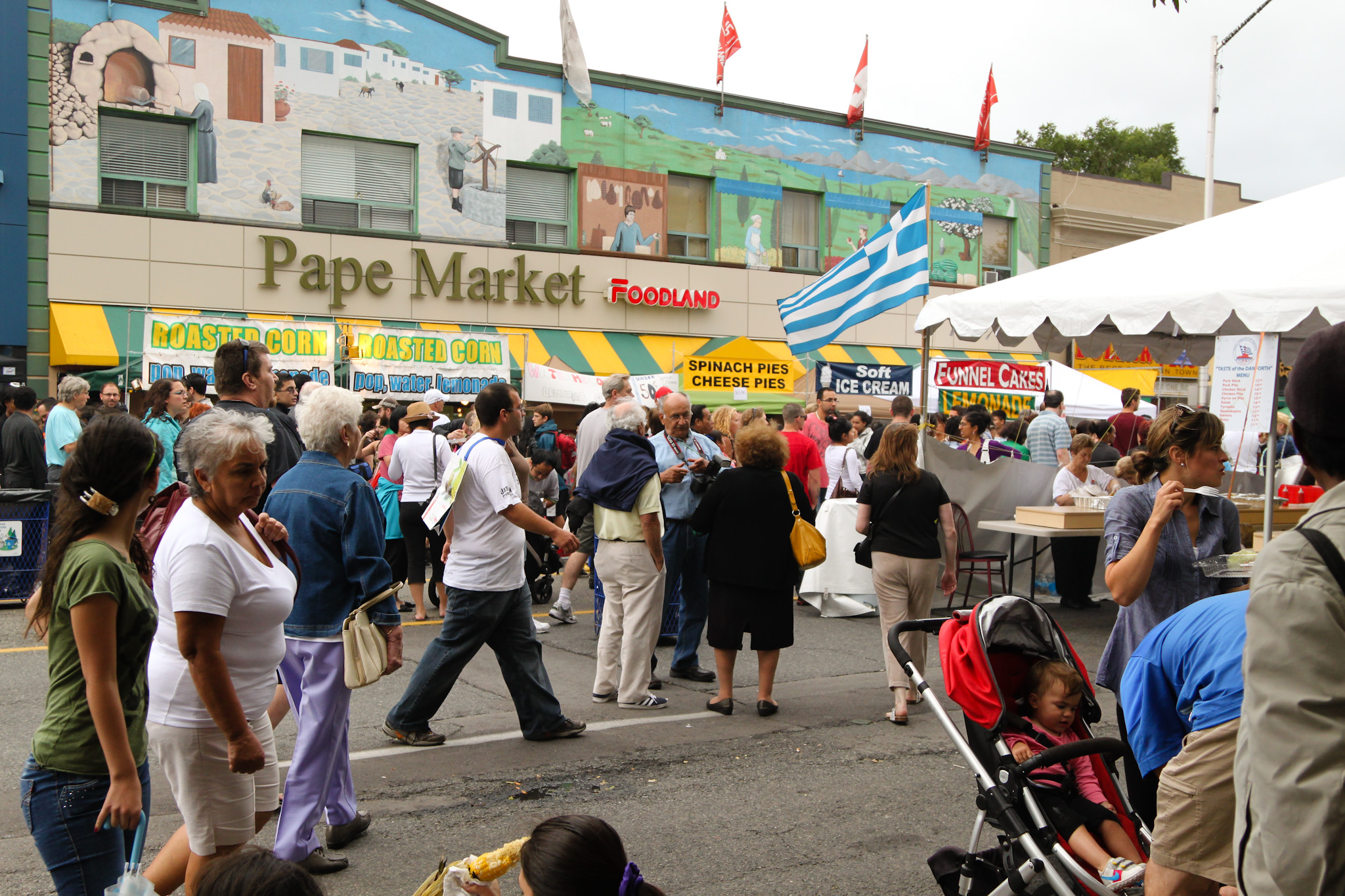
The Taste of the Danforth is an annual festival held in Greektown, celebrating Greek cuisine and culture.

The annual Taste of the Danforth is a large food festival held over 2½ days in mid-August. With no admission charge, the event welcomes all to enjoy modestly priced samples of cuisine available at restaurants along the stretch of Danforth Avenue from Broadview to Jones Avenues. Greek food prevails, but there are numerous options, including Thai, Chinese, Brazilian, Indian, Japanese and others. A midway offers games, children's rides, and interactive sports that include a climbing wall, street hockey and basketball. Several stages offer musical entertainment spanning the globe, with one stage emphasizing Greek performers of music, song, and dance. The event has grown substantially since the first Taste, in 1994, when 5,000 attended. In 2008, it drew over a million people, moving to 1.5 million by 2015. The event was cancelled in 2020 and 2021 due to COVID-19. It was also cancelled in 2022, 2024 and 2025.

== Street signs ==
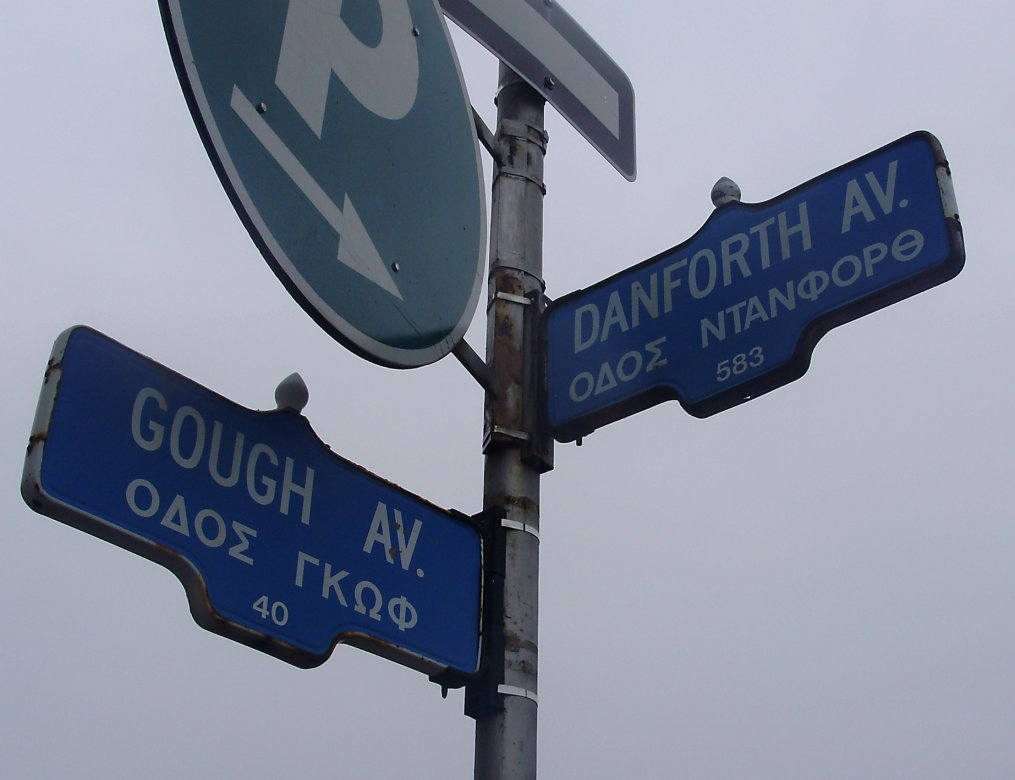
Street signs in the Danforth

The street signs in Greektown are in both English and Standard Modern Greek. Romanization is based on ISO 843.

- Carlaw Avenue – Οδος Καρλαω (Odos Karlaō)
- Danforth Avenue – Οδος Ντανφορθ (Odos Ntanphorth)
- Gough Avenue – Οδος Γκωφ (Odos Gkōph)
- Pape Avenue – Οδος Πεηπ (Odos Peīp)

== See also ==
- Greek Canadians
- Greek Canadians in the Greater Toronto Area
- 1918 Toronto anti-Greek riot
