= Stamos (surname) =

Stamos is a surname of Greek origin. Notable people with the surname include:

- Alex Stamos (born 1979), American computer scientist
- David N. Stamos (born 1957), Canadian philosopher and professor
- John Stamos (born 1963), American actor, producer, musician, and singer
- John J. Stamos (1924–2017), Greek-American Justice of the Supreme Court of Illinois
- Theodoros Stamos (1922–1997), Greek-American painter
