= Giannou =

Giannou is a surname. Notable people with the surname include:

- Apostolos Giannou (born 1990), Greek-Australian footballer
- Chris Giannou (born 1949), Greek-Canadian war surgeon
- Eleni Giannou (born 1993), Cypriot footballer
- Kleopas Giannou (born 1982), Greek footballer
