= Greeks of Toronto =

Greeks of Toronto Έλληνες του Τορόντο
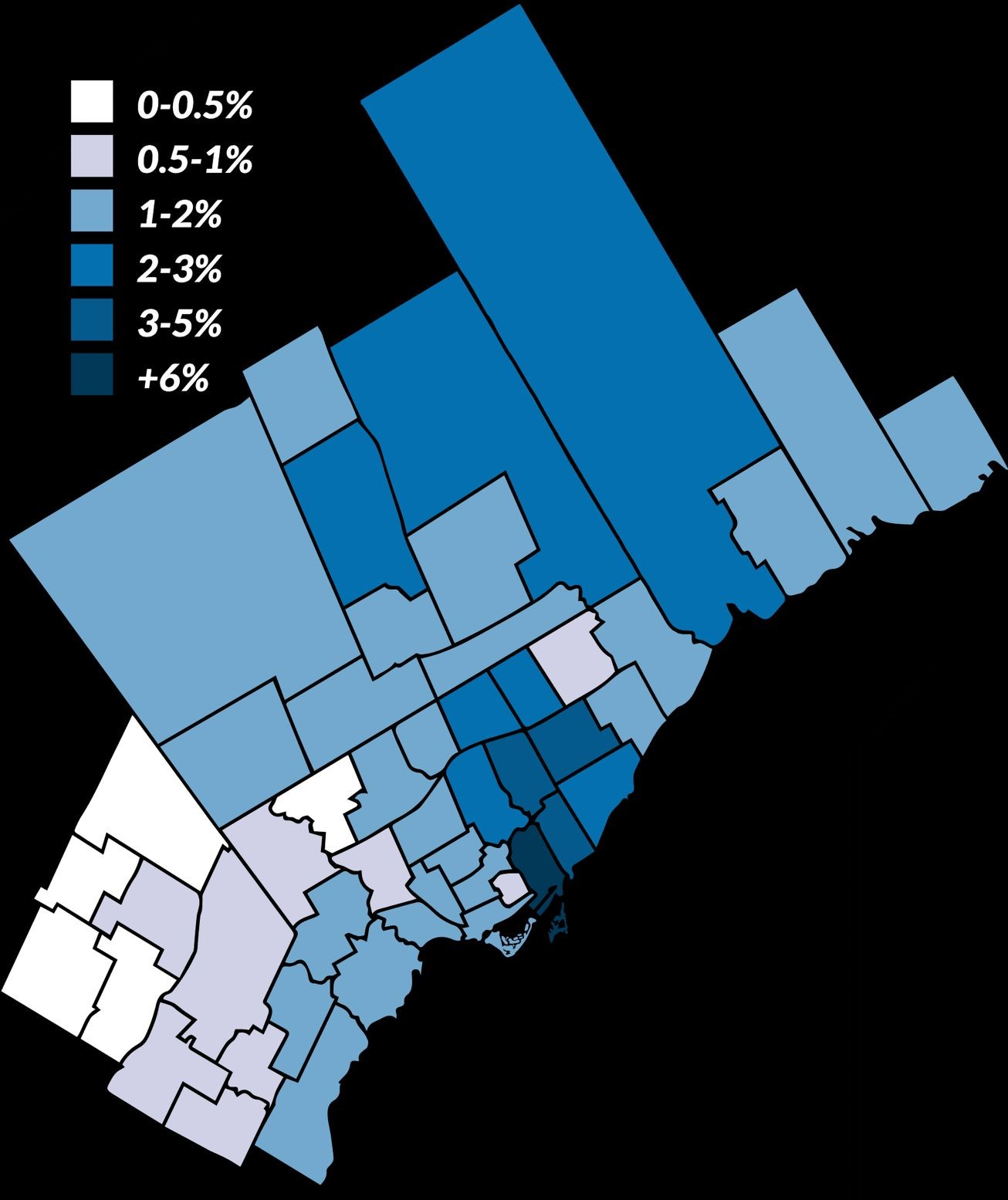
- Population distribution of Greek Canadians in Toronto by percentage of total population by federal electoral district, 2021 census

Total population
- Greeks; 97,940 by ancestry (1.69% of Greater Toronto's population)

Languages
- Canadian English; Greek

Religion
- Predominantly Greek Orthodox

Related ethnic groups
- part of Greek Canadians

The Greeks of Toronto (Greek: Έλληνες του Τορόντο) comprises Greek immigrants and their descendants living in Toronto, Canada.

According to the Canada 2016 Census, the Greater Toronto Area (GTA) is home to 97,940 Greek Canadians (1.69% of its total population), making it the metropolitan area with the highest concentration of Greeks in the country. Toronto is an important Greek population centre in North America, along with Boston, Chicago, and New York City.

== Demographics ==
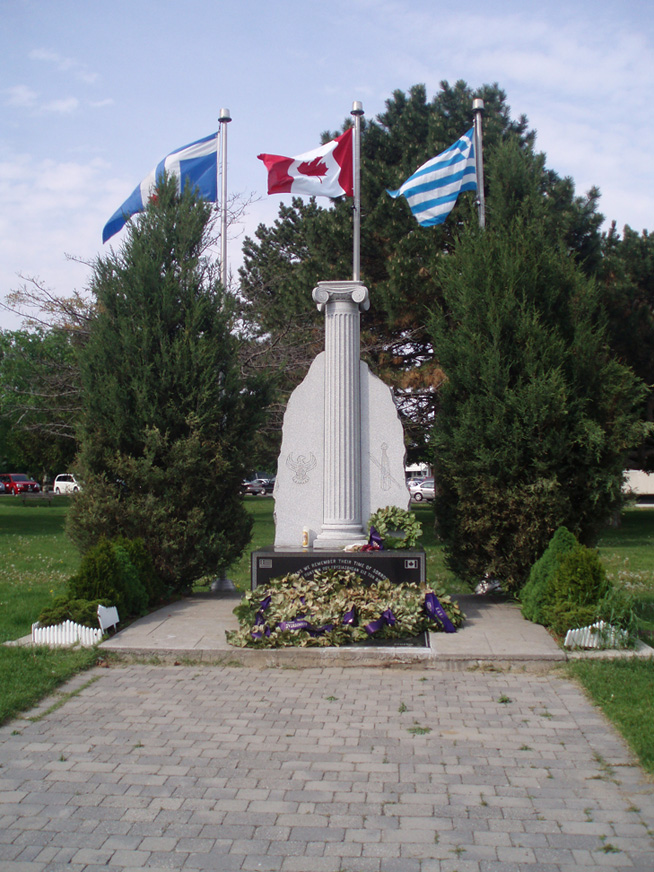
The Greek Pontian Memorial in Toronto

The GTA cities and towns by population of Greek Canadians are as follows, according to 2016 Census:

| City/Town | Greek Canadians | Percentage |
|---|---|---|
| Toronto | 57,420 | 2.13 |
| Mississauga | 7,490 | 1.05 |
| Markham | 6,215 | 1.90 |
| Vaughan | 5,065 | 1.67 |
| Richmond Hill | 4,255 | 2.20 |
| Brampton | 2,515 | 0.43 |
| Oakville | 2,380 | 1.24 |
| Pickering | 2,270 | 2.49 |
| Ajax | 1,735 | 1.46 |
| Whitchurch-Stoufville | 1,710 | 3.77 |
| Newmarket | 1,585 | 1.92 |
| Aurora | 1,435 | 2.62 |
| Milton | 1,055 | 0.97 |
| Halton Hills | 610 | 1.01 |
| Georgina | 440 | 0.98 |
| Uxbridge | 415 | 1.98 |
| King | 380 | 1.56 |
| East Gwillimbury | 370 | 1.58 |
| Bradford West Gwillimbury | 370 | 1.06 |
| New Tecumseth | 225 | 0.67 |

The GTA ridings (federal electoral districts) with the highest percentage of Greek Canadians are as follows, according to 2016 Census:

| Riding | Greek Canadians | Percentage |
|---|---|---|
| Toronto—Danforth | 7,655 | 7.26 |
| Scarborough Centre | 4,945 | 4.48 |
| Beaches—East York | 4,585 | 4.23 |
| Don Valley East | 3,785 | 4.06 |
| Markham—Stouffville | 3,885 | 3.11 |
| Scarborough—Agincourt | 2,805 | 2.69 |
| Scarborough Southwest | 2,830 | 2.61 |
| Pickering—Uxbridge | 2,695 | 2.40 |
| Don Valley West | 2,430 | 2.39 |
| Don Valley North | 2,590 | 2.37 |
| Aurora—Oak Ridges—Richmond Hill | 2,660 | 2.33 |
| Newmarket—Aurora | 2,580 | 2.23 |
| Toronto—St. Paul's | 2,190 | 2.09 |
| Vaughan—Woodbridge | 2,145 | 2.05 |
| Etobicoke Centre | 2,285 | 1.97 |
| Richmond Hill | 2,125 | 1.940 |
| Eglinton—Lawrence | 2,190 | 1.939 |
| Markham—Unionville | 2,300 | 1.87 |
| Parkdale—High Park | 1,945 | 1.823 |
| Davenport | 1,955 | 1.820 |
| University—Rosedale | 1,705 | 1.70 |

Greek is the 20th most commonly spoken language in the Toronto CMA, with 41,225 people (0.7% of the population) speaking Greek (2016 Census).

In the City of Toronto per se, Greek is the 17th most common ethnic origin, being claimed by 57,425 people (2.1% of the population), as per 2016 Census.

Furthermore, as designated by the City of Toronto 2006 Census data (total responses), Greek is the top ethnic origin in the Broadview North neighbourhood (15% of the population).

== History ==
The 1918 Toronto anti-Greek riot was a pogrom affecting the Greek community.

== Culture ==
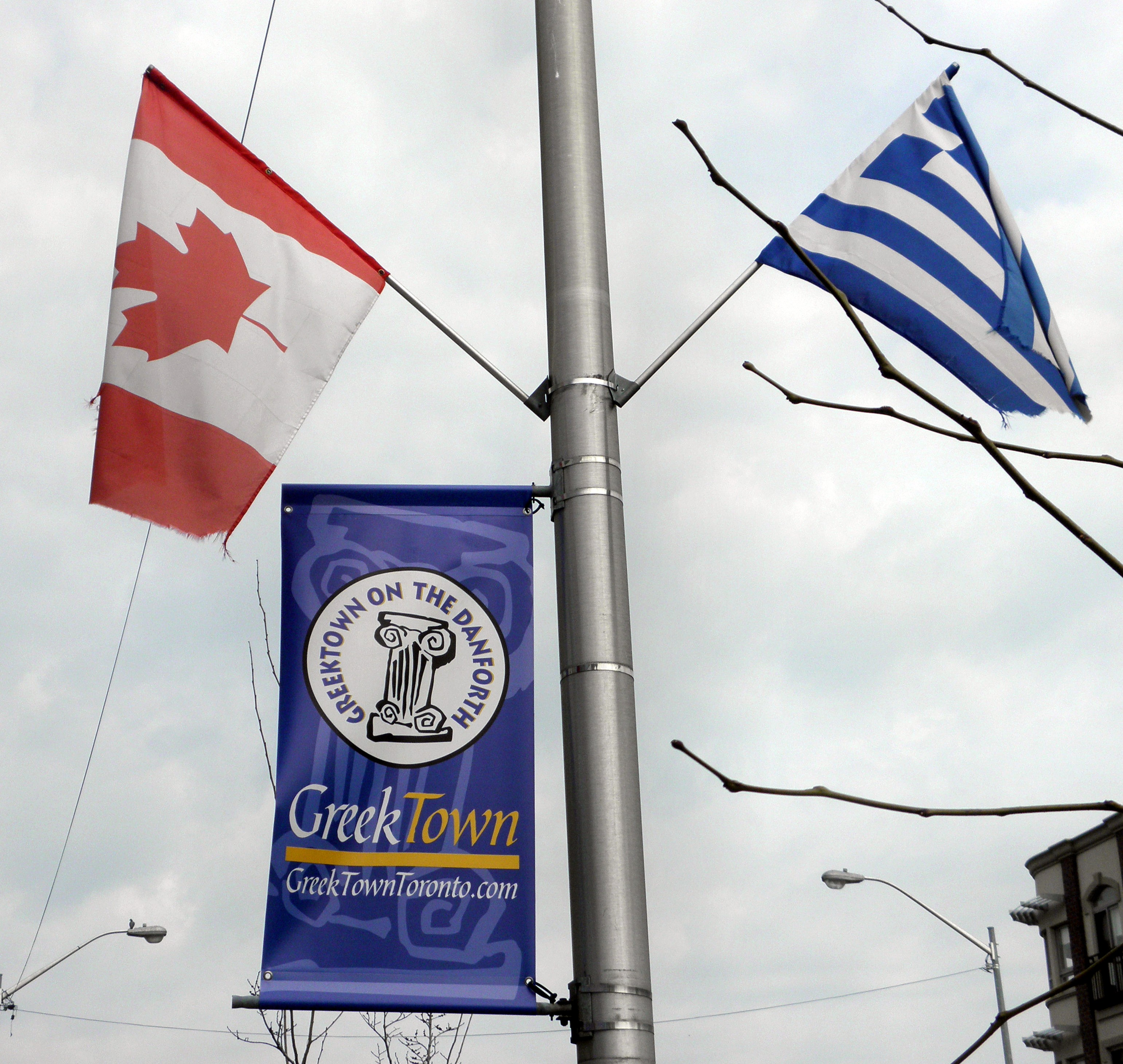
The flags of Canada and Greece in Greektown, Toronto.

Greek culture in Toronto can be seen in Greektown, the largest Greek neighbourhood in North America.

== See also ==
- Demographics of Toronto
- Greektown, Toronto
