= Taste of the Danforth =

Yearly festival held in Toronto, Canada

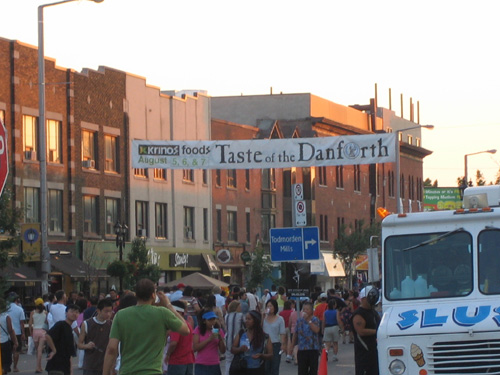
- Status: Active
- Genre: Festival
- Frequency: Yearly
- Locations: Greektown, Toronto, Ontario
- Country: Canada
- Inaugurated: 1994
- Website: tasteofthedanforth.com

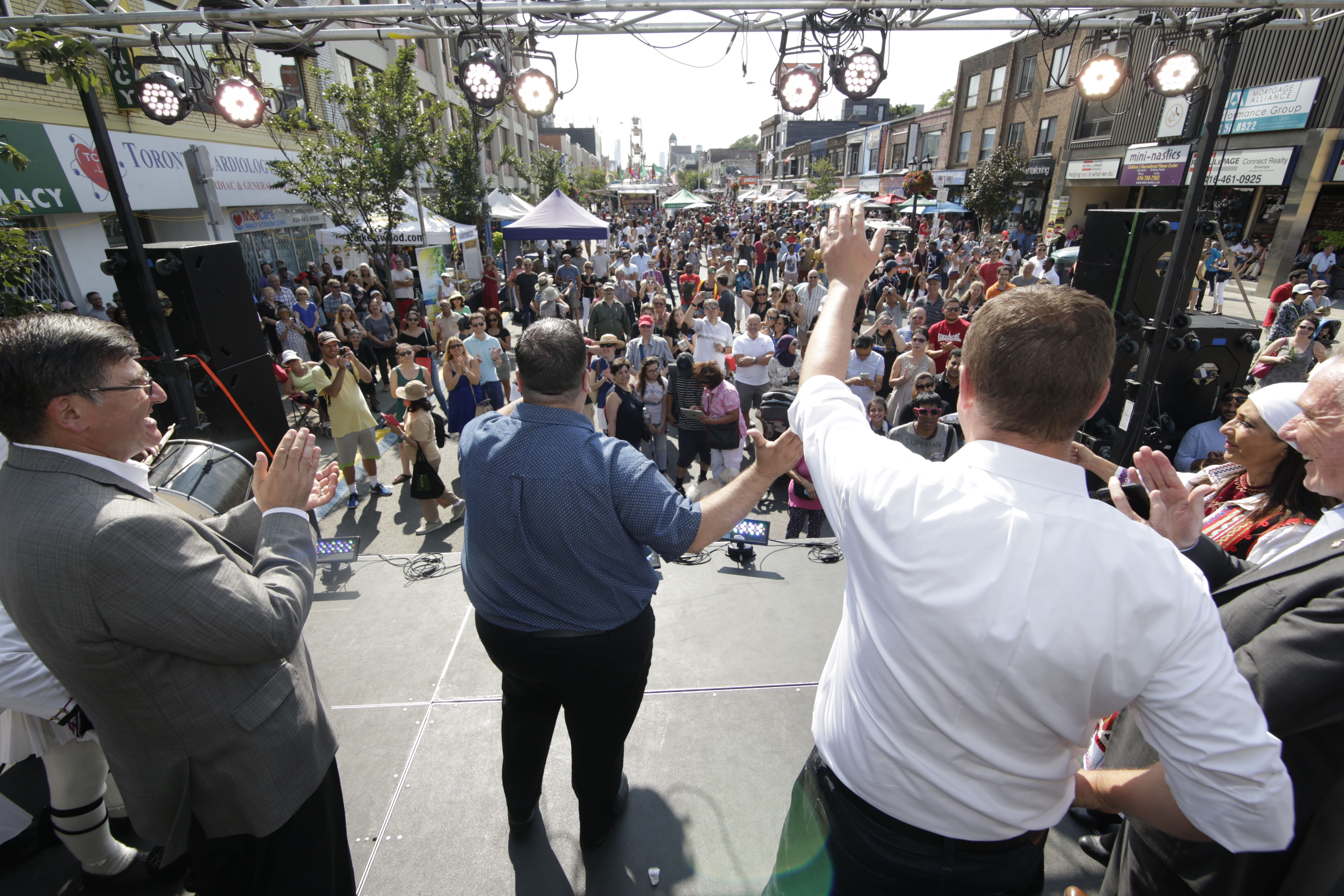
Event in 2018

Taste of the Danforth is a yearly festival held in Toronto, Ontario, Canada, in the Greektown area along Danforth Avenue for a period of three days in August, spawned from the Taste of Chicago in Chicago, Illinois, United States. It was Canada's largest street festival. It started in 1994, and in 2018, it completed its 25th year of this event which celebrated Greek food and culture.

This event generally occurred the second weekend of August. Past attendance numbers have been reported as high as 1.6 million people over the three-day event. Approximately 1.6 kilometres of Danforth Avenue was closed from Broadview Avenue to past Jones Avenue for the festival.

It was announced on May 15, 2020, that the festival scheduled for August 7–9, 2020 was cancelled due to gathering restrictions of 25,000 people or more as mandated by the City of Toronto amid the global COVID-19 pandemic. It was also cancelled in 2021 and later in 2022. It was also cancelled in 2024 due to funding contraints, and in 2025 because of the unavailability of the person who would organize the event. In February 2026, Ontario premier Doug Ford announced that the province would finance the event if the city also contributes. The 2026 festival was held August 7–9, according to the Greektown on the Danforth BIA.

== Food and attractions ==
Greek food included pork, chicken, and beef souvlaki, spanakopita, loukoumades, gyros, and roast quail. Attendees also enjoyed seated dining within the many restaurants throughout Danforth Avenue and enjoyed such Greek favourites as saganaki (the "flaming" cheese), and delicious fresh Greek salads. Existing stores and restaurants were also open during the festival, usually opening up their stores to the streets for customers.

Interactive activities were available at The Taste, including face-painting and video games.
