= Christina-Laia Vlahos =

Canadian TV Presenter

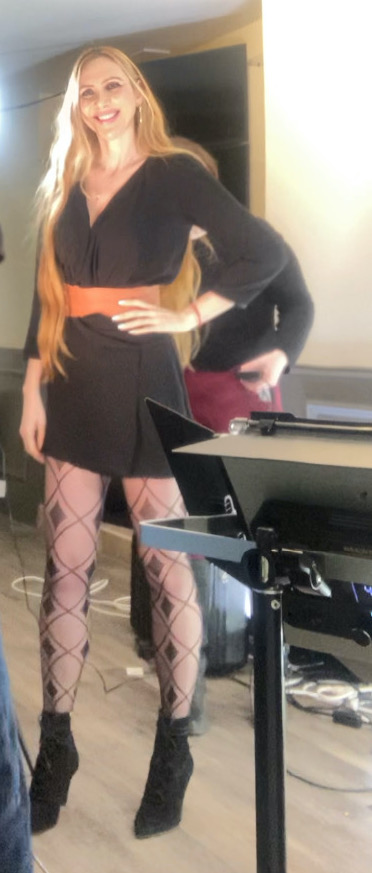
- Christina-Laia Vlahos filming on set
- Born: Toronto, Ontario, Canada
- Occupation: TV Presenter
- Known for: Star Foodies, The Weather Network, CBC
- Modeling information
- Height: 5 ft 8 in (1.73 m)
- Hair color: Blonde
- Eye color: Green/Hazel
- Website: http://www.christinalaia.com

Christina-Laia Vlahos is a Canadian television presenter. She hosts the show "Star Foodies!" on Canada's OMNI.1 channel.

== Early life ==
Vlahos was born in Toronto to a Greek-Canadian family. Both her parents immigrated to Canada in the 1960s where they met and have resided ever since. She received a Bachelor of Arts double degree in mass communications and political science from York University in Toronto. While studying Spanish in Málaga she was nicknamed “gringlish girl”, which she adopted as her nickname. She also adopted the middle name Laia, shortened from the Greek feminine given name Eulalia (Greek: Ευλαλια), which means “well-spoken.” Vlahos is fluent in English, French, Greek and Spanish.

== Star Foodies! ==
In 2016 Vlahos created the concept for Star Foodies!, a half-hour travel and cooking show with a celebrity focus. The multi-lingual subtitled show was picked up by Canada's OMNI 1 channel and debuted nationally on 27 October 2018. The first season, subtitled Greece Edition, resulted from Vlahos living between Greece and Canada. In each episode sees Vlahos meet with a Greek celebrity to talk about life and food, before heading back to Canada to re-create a personal recipe of the celebrity with a Canadian Chef. The first episode of the series included Greek singer and actor Sakis Rouvas, and Canadian Chef Christine Cushing recreating Rouvas' personal recipe for Pastitsada, a dish from his home island of Corfu.

The show has garnered mainstream press within Canada, The Toronto Sun's Senior Lifestyle and Food editor, Rita DeMontis described "the premise of the show (as) simple, yet unique". As of 2020 the show continues to air OMNI 1, with the second season, which debuted in October 2019 and starred John O'Hurley, known for the role of J. Peterman on the NBC sitcom Seinfeld. O'Hurley joined Vlahos in Toronto where he was a Star Foodie revealing his personal recipe for Vanilla Seafood Sauce. The recipe was re-created by Greek-American actor, Christos Vasilopoulos who re-made the recipe from Los Angeles. ".

Season 4 of the series, "Cyprus Edition" premiered on OMNI Television October 2, 2021. In the latest season Vlahos showcases the multi-level food scene in Cyprus, where she chats with the locals about personal recipes, projects and what it's like living on the island. Along the way, the vivacious host interviews local personalities and stars, including Olympic athlete Milan Trajkovic.

The National Herald describes Christina as the "tall, statuesque and very Greek-Canadian, TV entertainer" who has made a name for herself with the cooking show Star Foodies and in the fourth season took to the road to Cyprus to show off food and local talent.

The fifth season of the travel and food series was filmed on Aegina Island.

== The Weather Network ==
From February 2020 – 2021, Vlahos was contracted (1-year maternity leave) as Presenter on The Weather Network in Canada. She presented the weekend evening/overnight program across Canada and also appeared live on the CBC Saturday and Sunday evenings reporting the current, and long range local weather forecast. CBC anchor, Marivel Taruc referred to Christina as "a real bright spot" in the show, during her final weather segment on CBC Live (Ontario) January 31, 2021.
