= Nicholas Salamis =

- Born: August 13, 1897; Samos, Principality of Samos, Ottoman Empire
- Died: October 15, 2005 (aged 108); Montreal, Quebec, Canada
- Church: Greek Orthodox
- Ordained: Deaconate: September 25, 1938; Priesthood: September 26, 1938

Nicholas Salamis (Greek: Νικόλαος Σαλάμης; August 13, 1897 – October 15, 2005) was a Greek Orthodox priest of the Eastern Orthodox faith who witnessed almost a century of Greek emigration into Canada.

== Early life ==
Salamis was born on the Greek island of Samos. When he was five, his father died, leaving the family destitute. His mother raised her two sons and one daughter on money earned by renting out a mule for conveyance to local villagers.

Salamis' mother enrolled both her sons in a high school, where Nicholas would receive training in commerce.

Nicholas first immigrated to America (see Greek American), then settled in the Greek community of Montréal in 1919, where he would go on to become a bookkeeper for his community, though Salamis would become dissatisfied with this position.

== Study ==
At 35, Salamis returned to Athens to study theology, with the intention to become an Orthodox priest.

In October of 1938, Salamis returned to Montréal to begin his priesthood at St. George Greek Orthodox Church parish, spending seven years there until joining the Holy Trinity Greek Orthodox Church, eventually leaving in June of 1961, joining the St. George Greek Orthodox Church in Toronto, where he would remain until December of 1968.

== Return to Canada ==
Salamis' return to Montréal coincided with over 100,000 Greeks immigrating to Canada, who were largely uneducated, unskilled, with little or no knowledge of either official language of Canada, many of whom Salamis would go on to provide with baptisms, weddings, and funerals, easing the frictions which developed between the established Greek community and the new immigrants, who were referred to as "displaced persons" (see Greek Diaspora).

== Pastoral work ==
By his own count, Salamis performed over 10,000 religious ceremonies during his service to the Greek Orthodox community of Canada.

Over the next forty years, Salami would assist many immigrants and their children to become members of the greater Canadian society as they would learn the official languages and receive some general education.

Salamis died at the age of 108 on October 15, 2005.

Dates of Ordination:

- Deaconate: September 25, 1938
- Priesthood: September 26, 1938

Communities Served:

- June 1961 – 1990: St. George Greek Orthodox Church, Montréal, Québec
- April 1945 – May 1961: Holy Trinity Greek Orthodox Church, Montréal, Québec
- October 1938 – March 1945: St. George Greek Orthodox Church, Toronto, Ontario

== See also ==
- A Scattering of Seeds
