= Chris Giannou =

Canadian war surgeon

Chris Giannou, CM (born 1949) is a Greek Canadian war surgeon and served chief surgeon for the International Committee of the Red Cross (ICRC) until December 2006.

== General ==
Giannou was educated at the University of Toronto Schools. After a year of studies at McGill University, Giannou left Canada to spend a year teaching in Mali. There he fell sick, and was cared for by a team of two French-trained Malian doctors. Recognizing the doctor's frustration at the disparity between the facilities in which they had been trained and those available to them for practice, Giannou resolved to study medicine within the developing world in order to practice within it.

After studies in Algiers, Algeria; Angers, France; and Cairo, Egypt, Giannou went on to begin a surgical career which has taken him to many of the contemporary world's most mediatized conflict zones, including Afghanistan, Chechnya, Iraq, Lebanon, Liberia and Somalia. Although he had trained as a cancer surgeon in Egypt, Giannou began to develop a specialized expertise in war surgery. Giannou is reportedly known among humanitarian workers for his efficiency. He is reputed to be one of the few non-Palestinians to have sat as a member of the Palestine National Council, and is noted for his work as the only surgeon, alongside thousands of Palestinians, during the Lebanese Shiite militia Amal's siege of the Palestinian refugee camp Shatila in 1985–86, documented in his Besieged: A Doctor's Story of Life and Death in Beirut (1991).

== Chechnya controversy ==
In 1996 the ICRC decided to build a surgical hospital in the city of Novye Atagi, 25 kilometres south of the capital, Grozny. Giannou and others based their decision on the success of the Kesanyeh hospital in Somalia, which was able to treat thousands of victims of the war and is still operating successfully today. By the time the hospital in Chechnya was completed, however, relatively few wounded remained in the area. The hospital would treat 300 war-wounded, among whom about 45 land-mine victims, but staff faced growing hostility from the local population. On 17 December 1996 ICRC staff in Novye Atagi were attacked by as-yet-unidentified assassins in the worst single attack on Red Cross workers in the organization's history, leaving six members dead and one severely wounded. Giannou returned to Novye Atagi to help return the bodies for burial, calling the experience "one of the worst experiences of my life". Following the attacks the ICRC evacuated some 70 employees from Chechnya; other international aid agencies followed their lead.

== Today ==
Giannou left his official post with the ICRC after 7 years as the head of Unit Surgery, and today carries out international surgical missions around the world on their behalf. He is the topic of the Cineflix film "On the Border of the Abyss" which covers his lifetime of work in helping less-fortunate people and in mastering the concepts of war surgery. The documentary was aired, as "War Surgeon: Chris Giannou", by the Canadian public television station TVO on 10 April 2002. Recently, Giannou was the lead author on a new War Surgery book published by the International Committee of the Red Cross. Volume 1 of the book, called "War Surgery: Working with Limited Resources in Armed Conflict and Other Situations of Violence" is currently available on the ICRC website. He continues to inspire many to become war surgeons (such as FTH).

== Awards ==
In 1991, Giannou was inducted as a member of the Order of Canada.
