= Tom Karalis =

Canadian ice hockey defenceman

- Born: May 24, 1964 (age 60); Montreal, Quebec, Canada
- Height: 6 ft 1 in (185 cm)
- Weight: 209 lb (95 kg; 14 st 13 lb)
- Position: Defence
- Shot: Left
- Played for: Fredericton Express; Muskegon Lumberjacks; Flint Spirits; Baltimore Skipjacks; Indianapolis Ice; New Haven Nighthawks; Phoenix Roadrunners; Peoria Rivermen; Fort Wayne Komets; Moncton Hawks; Binghamton Rangers; Murrayfield Racers; Brest Albatros Hockey; Ducs d'Angers; EC VSV
- Playing career: 1985–1998

Tom Karalis (born May 24, 1964) is a Canadian-American former ice hockey defenceman.

Karalis played in the American Hockey League for the Fredericton Express, Baltimore Skipjacks, New Haven Nighthawks, Moncton Hawks and Binghamton Rangers. He also played in the International Hockey League for the Muskegon Lumberjacks, Flint Spirits, Indianapolis Ice, Phoenix Roadrunners, Peoria Rivermen and Fort Wayne Komets. He won a CHL championship with the Tulsa Oilers in the 1992-93 season.

Karalis moved to Europe in 1994, playing in France for Brest Albatros Hockey and Ducs d'Angers, Austria for EV VSV and Germany for SC Bietigheim-Bissingen before returning to the Tulsa Oilers for a second spell during the 1997–98 season, his final season before retiring.

Karalis kept residence in Tulsa after retirement and later became an American citizen.

== Career statistics ==
			Regular season					Playoffs
Season	Team	League	GP	G	A	Pts	PIM	GP	G	A	Pts	PIM
1979–80	Bourassa Angevins	QMAAA	22	1	15	16	64	2	0	1	1	0
1980–81	Bourassa Angevins	QMAAA	47	11	34	45	—	11	4	9	13	—
1981–82	Shawinigan Cataractes	QMJHL	42	0	5	5	107	14	2	8	10	29
1982–83	Shawinigan Cataractes	QMJHL	22	3	2	5	107	—	—	—	—	—
1982–83	Drummondville Voltigeurs	QMJHL	42	3	9	12	114	—	—	—	—	—
1983–84	Drummondville Voltigeurs	QMJHL	67	16	37	53	308	10	2	6	8	28
1984–85	Drummondville Voltigeurs	QMJHL	64	21	58	79	184	9	0	7	7	15
1985–86	Fredericton Express	AHL	51	4	8	12	106	—	—	—	—	—
1985–86	Muskegon Lumberjacks	IHL	21	5	8	13	84	11	1	3	4	32
1986–87	Fredericton Express	AHL	37	0	3	3	64	—	—	—	—	—
1986–87	Muskegon Lumberjacks	IHL	28	3	9	12	94	15	2	12	14	28
1987–88	Flint Spirits	IHL	65	5	26	31	268	2	0	0	0	2
1987–88	Baltimore Skipjacks	AHL	17	0	2	2	87	—	—	—	—	—
1988–89	Flint Spirits	IHL	38	1	6	7	170	—	—	—	—	—
1988–89	Indianapolis Ice	IHL	26	0	8	8	132	—	—	—	—	—
1988–89	New Haven Nighthawks	AHL	11	2	3	5	8	—	—	—	—	—
1989–90	New Haven Nighthawks	AHL	2	0	0	0	0	—	—	—	—	—
1989–90	Phoenix Roadrunners	IHL	21	1	3	4	35	—	—	—	—	—
1989–90	Peoria Rivermen	IHL	48	2	8	10	182	5	0	2	2	48
1990–91	Fort Wayne Komets	IHL	79	5	21	26	239	8	1	2	3	21
1991–92	Fort Wayne Komets	IHL	1	0	0	0	2	—	—	—	—	—
1991–92	Moncton Hawks	AHL	6	0	0	0	4	—	—	—	—	—
1991–92	Binghamton Rangers	AHL	2	0	1	1	0	—	—	—	—	—
1991–92	Murrayfield Racers	BHL	19	4	16	20	121	6	3	3	6	77
1992–93	Tulsa Oilers	CHL	56	11	33	44	235	12	3	7	10	87
1993–94	Tulsa Oilers	CHL	46	6	30	36	172	—	—	—	—	—
1993–94	Wichita Thunder	CHL	3	1	2	3	6	11	3	9	12	24
1994–95	Albatros de Brest	France	28	4	8	12	97	9	1	3	4	22
1995–96	Ducs d'Angers	France	24	1	3	4	69	2	0	0	0	0
1996–97	Villacher SV	Austria	49	3	24	27	123	—	—	—	—	—
1997–98	SC Bietigheim-Bissingen	Germany2	20	1	4	5	44	—	—	—	—	—
1997–98	Tulsa Oilers	CHL	43	2	11	13	171	4	0	2	2	4
AHL totals			126	6	17	23	269	—	—	—	—	—
IHL totals			327	22	89	111	1,206	41	4	19	23	131
