= Sam Kolias =

Canadian businessman

Sam Kolias is the chairman and CEO of Boardwalk REIT (TSX: BEI.UN).

In 2006, Kolias and his brother Van, Senior Vice-president of Quality Control of Boardwalk, were at #81 of the top 100 richest people in Canada as compiled by Canadian Business magazine.
