= David N. Stamos =

Canadian philosopher of science and professor

Education
- Education: York University

Philosophical work
- Era: Contemporary philosophy
- Region: Western philosophy
- School: Analytic philosophy
- Main interests: Philosophy of biology

David N. Stamos (born 1957) is a Canadian philosopher of science and professor in the Philosophy Department at York University. He studied in York University, where he received his Ph.D. in Philosophy. He emphasizes an interdisciplinary approach for philosophy. His two main mottoes are: "It is not wisdom to ignore evidence" and "Politics does not determine good scholarship."

== Research interests ==
- Philosophy of biology
- Darwin (historical research on his species concept and pre-Darwinian taxonomy)
- David Hume (finding Hume's God).
- Human nature
- Human rights
- Scientific Imagination
- Karl Popper
- Albert Einstein
- Edgar Allan Poe

== Selected books ==
- Edgar Allan Poe, Eureka, and Scientific Imagination. Paradigm Publishers. 2017.
- The Myth of Universal Human Rights: Its Origin, History, and Explanation, Along with a More Humane Way. SUNY Press. 2013. ISBN 978-1-61205-241-0
- Evolution and the Big Questions: Sex, Race, Religion, and Other Matters. Wiley-Blackwell. 2008. ISBN 1-4051-4903-5
  - Recipient of a Choice 2008 Outstanding Academic Title Award, translated into Spanish and Portuguese, forthcoming in Arabic.
- Darwin and the Nature of Species. State University of New York Press. 2007. ISBN 0-7914-6938-7
- The Species Problem: Biological Species, Ontology, and the Metaphysics of Biology. Lexington Books. 2004. ISBN 0-7391-0778-X
