= 1918 Toronto anti-Greek riot =

Three-day racist riots in Canada

- Location: Toronto, Ontario, Canada
- Date: 2–4 August 1918 or 1–5 August 1918
- Target: Toronto's Greek population and Greek-owned businesses
- Attack type: Pogrom
- Perpetrators: Canadian military veterans and civilians
- No. of participants: 50,000 (combined, at peak)
- Motive: Anti-Greek sentiment

The 1918 Toronto anti-Greek riot was a three-day race riot that took place across Toronto, Ontario, Canada, targeting Greek immigrants in early August 1918. The date range of the riots is variously cited as 2–4 August or 1–5 August, with some sources using the latter range to include the event that triggered the violence and the date of the final restoration of the peace. It was the largest riot in the city's history and one of the largest anti-Greek riots in the world. In the newspapers of the time, the events were referred to as the Toronto troubles. The riot was the result of prejudice against new immigrants as well as the false belief that Greeks were not fighting in World War I and held pro-German views.

The trigger for the riot was news about the expulsion of disabled military veteran Pte. Claude Cludernay from the Greek-owned White City Café on the evening of 1 August; Cludernay was drunk and had attacked a waiter, who ejected him and called police. Although the event was insignificant, it sparked indignation. Violence broke out on 2 August, when crowds comprising around 5,000–20,000 people, led by local military veterans, looted and destroyed every visibly Greek business in the city centre. Police forces in the area were reportedly overwhelmed and unable to stop the rioters, and instead stood by. Due to the scope of the violence, the mayor had to invoke the Riot Act to call in the militia and military police. By Saturday night (3 August), the police and militia were engaged in fierce fighting with rioters in downtown Toronto as they attempted to curb further violence. In total, an estimated 50,000 on both sides took part in the riot. Over 20 restaurants were attacked, with damages estimated at more than CA$1,000,000 in modern values (adjusted as of 2010).

After the events, Greek community leaders issued an official statement stating that they were in support of the Allies' cause. They stated that those immigrants who were naturalized were joining the Canadian Armed Forces and that there were more than 2,000 ethnic Greeks, many of them from Toronto, in the Canadian Expeditionary Force (CEF). At least five Torontonian Greeks had been killed and ten more had been incapacitated while serving in the CEF. Additionally, at least 135 Torontonian Greeks had returned home to join Greece's military against the Central Powers.

Many Greek families abandoned the area of Yonge Street after the riot, eventually forming a new Greek neighbourhood further east, along Danforth Avenue.

The Toronto riot echoed the 1909 Omaha riot in the United States, where Greek immigrants were attacked and displaced by violent mobs. The Greek diaspora responded with overt demonstrations of Western patriotism in the form of buying large amounts of war bonds during World War II and also changing their names to make them more familiar to North American ears.

== See also ==
- List of incidents of civil unrest in Canada
- Racism in Canada
  - Christie Pits riot (1933), violence by pro-Nazi demonstrators targeting Jews in Toronto
- Greek community of Toronto
- Omaha anti-Greek riot (1909), similar incident in the U.S. state of Nebraska
