= Irk (disambiguation) =

Irk or IRK may refer to:

- River Irk, a river in northwest England
  - Irk Valley, location of the Irk Valley Junction rail crash
- Irk (band), an English rock band from Leeds
- IATA airport code of Kirksville Regional Airport
- Inward-rectifier potassium ion channel, a class of protein
- ISO 639-3 code of the Iraqw language, a Cushitic language spoken in Tanzania
- Irk, the fictional homeworld of main character Zim in the animated TV series Invader Zim
- Islamic Republic of Kamistan, a fictional country in season 8 of the TV series 24

== See also ==
- IRQ (disambiguation)
- Irked Magazine
