= Śarīra =

Buddhist relics or bead-shaped objects

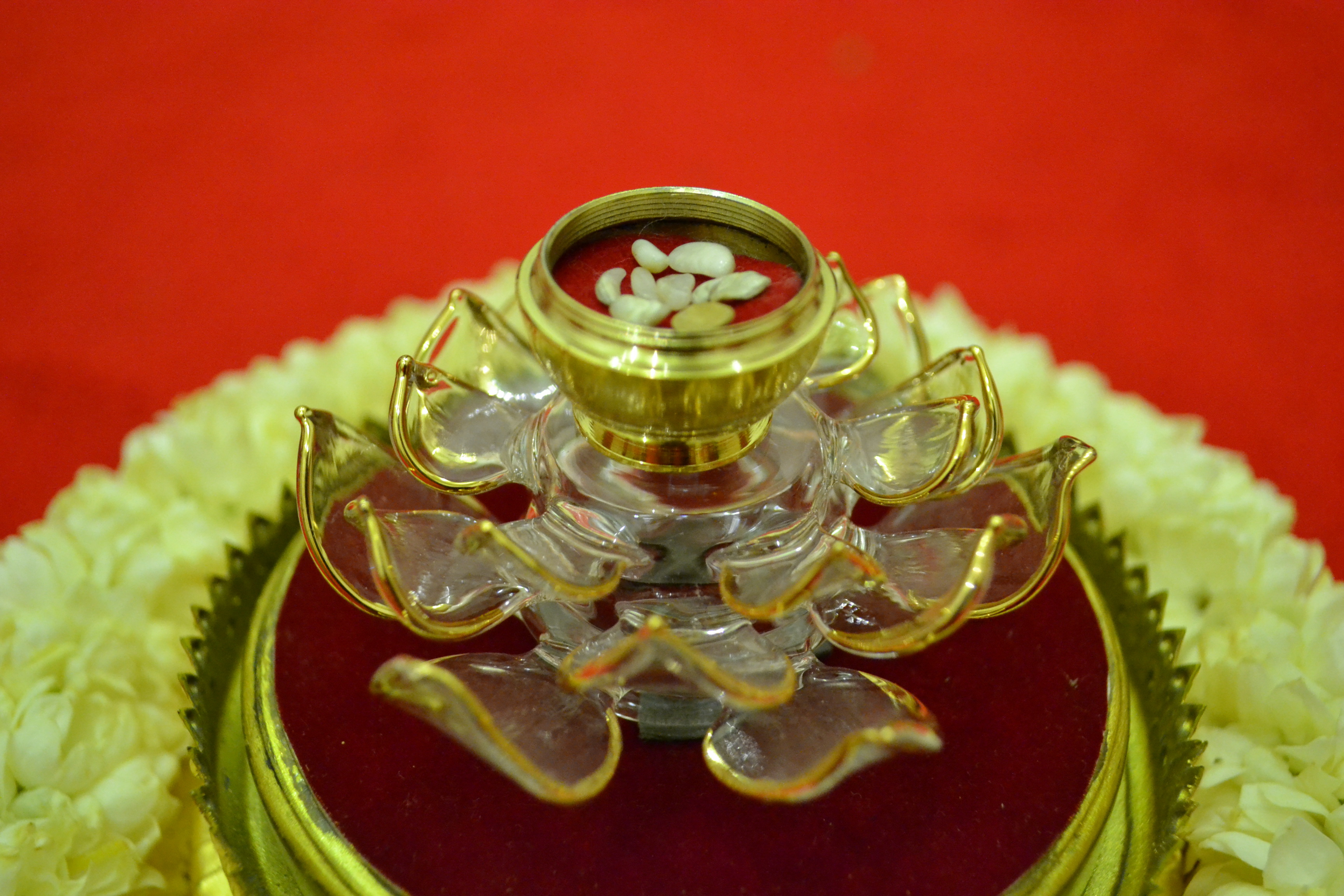
- Relics of the Buddha in a temple in Thailand

Chinese name
- Traditional Chinese: 舍利 or 舍利子
- Simplified Chinese: 舍利 or 舍利子
Transcriptions
Standard Mandarin
- Hanyu Pinyin: shèlì

Tibetan name
- Tibetan: རིང་བསྲེལ།
Transcriptions
- Wylie: ring bsrel

Vietnamese name
- Vietnamese: Xá lợi

Korean name
- Hangul: 사리
- Hanja: 舍利
Transcriptions
- Revised Romanization: sari
- McCune–Reischauer: sari

Japanese name
- Kanji: 仏舎利
- Hiragana: ぶっしゃり
Transcriptions
- Romanization: busshari

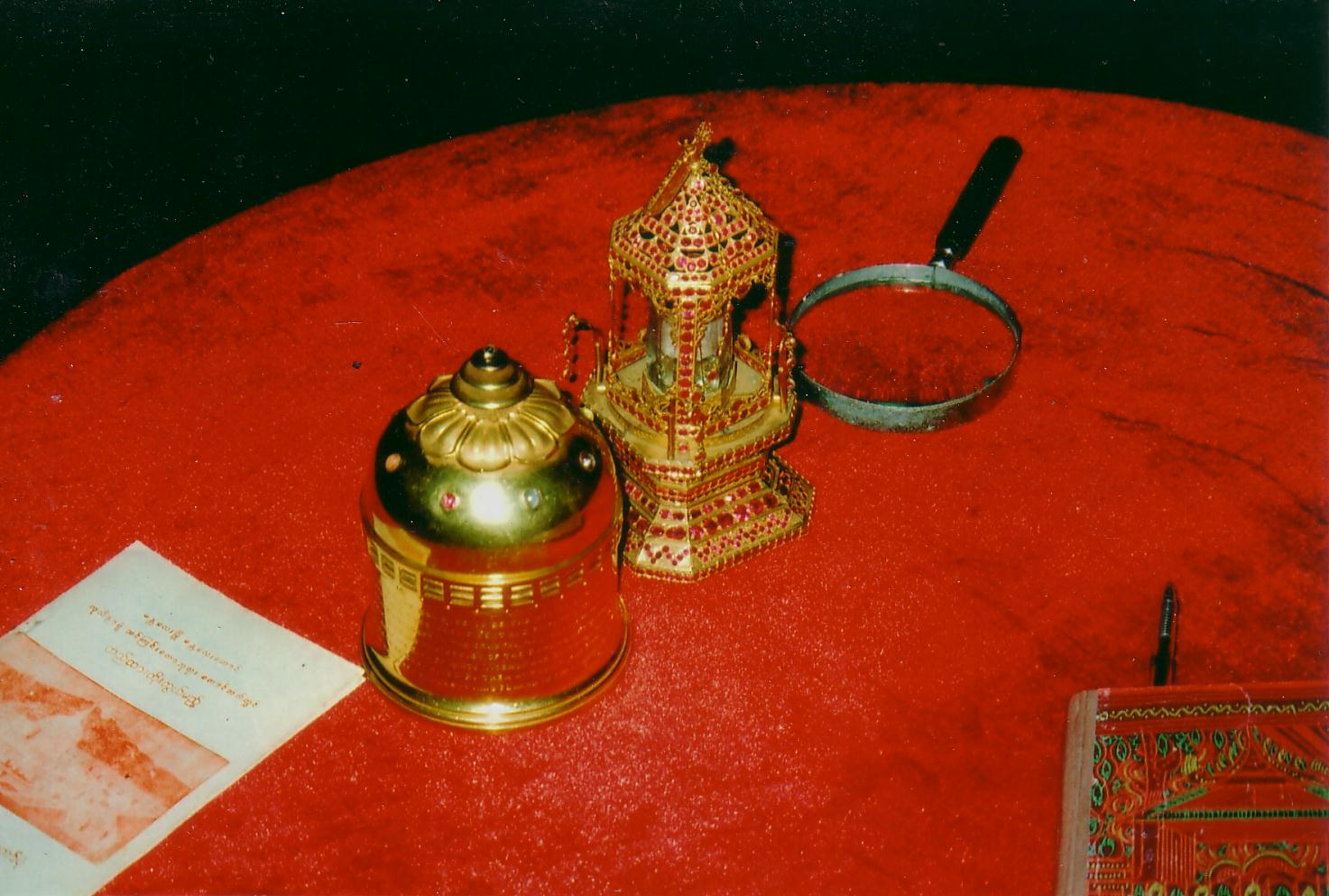
Buddha relics from Kanishka the Great's stupa in Peshawar, Pakistan, now in Mandalay, Burma. Teresa Merrigan, 2005

Śarīra is a generic term referring to Buddhist relics, although in common usage it usually refers to pearl or crystal-like bead-shaped objects that are found among the cremated ashes of Buddhist spiritual masters. Relics of the Buddha after cremation are termed dhātu in the Mahaparinibbana Sutta. Śarīra are held to emanate or incite adhiṣṭhāna (blessings) within the mindstream and experience of those connected to them. Sarira are also believed to ward off evil in the Himalayan Buddhist tradition.

== Terminology ==
Śarīraḥ (pronounced /ɕɐɽiːɽɐh/) means "body" in Sanskrit. When used in Buddhist Hybrid Sanskrit texts to mean "relics", it is always used in the plural: śarīrāḥ. The term ringsel is a loanword from the Tibetan རིང་བསྲེལ (ring bsrel). Both of these terms are ambiguous in English; they are generally used as synonyms, although according to some interpretations, ringsels are a subset of śarīras.

Śarīra can refer to:

- Dharmakāya śarīra, which are sutras as told by the Buddha. According to Ding Fubao's Dictionary of Buddhist Terms, a Dharma body śarīra is "the Sutra as told by the Buddha: That which is unchanging in what is told by the Buddha, is of the same property as the essence of the Buddha himself, hence it is called the 'dharma body śarīra'".
- Remains of the Buddha or other spiritual masters, either cremated remains or other pieces, including a finger bone or a preserved body, similar to the Roman Catholic and Eastern Orthodox incorruptibles.
- Broken-body śarīras refers specifically to cremated remains.
- When used without qualification, it generally refers to the pearl-like remnant of a master left after cremation.

Some Buddhist traditions also treated written scriptures as relics. Manuscripts deposited in stupas were sometimes called dharmasarira, "relics in the form of the teaching". Bronkhorst states that Brahmanical ideas about purity may have contributed to "shifts away from real bodily remains", with stupas, scriptures as dharmasarira, the Buddha's dharmakaya, and later Buddha images becoming more prominent.

== Pearl-like śarīras ==
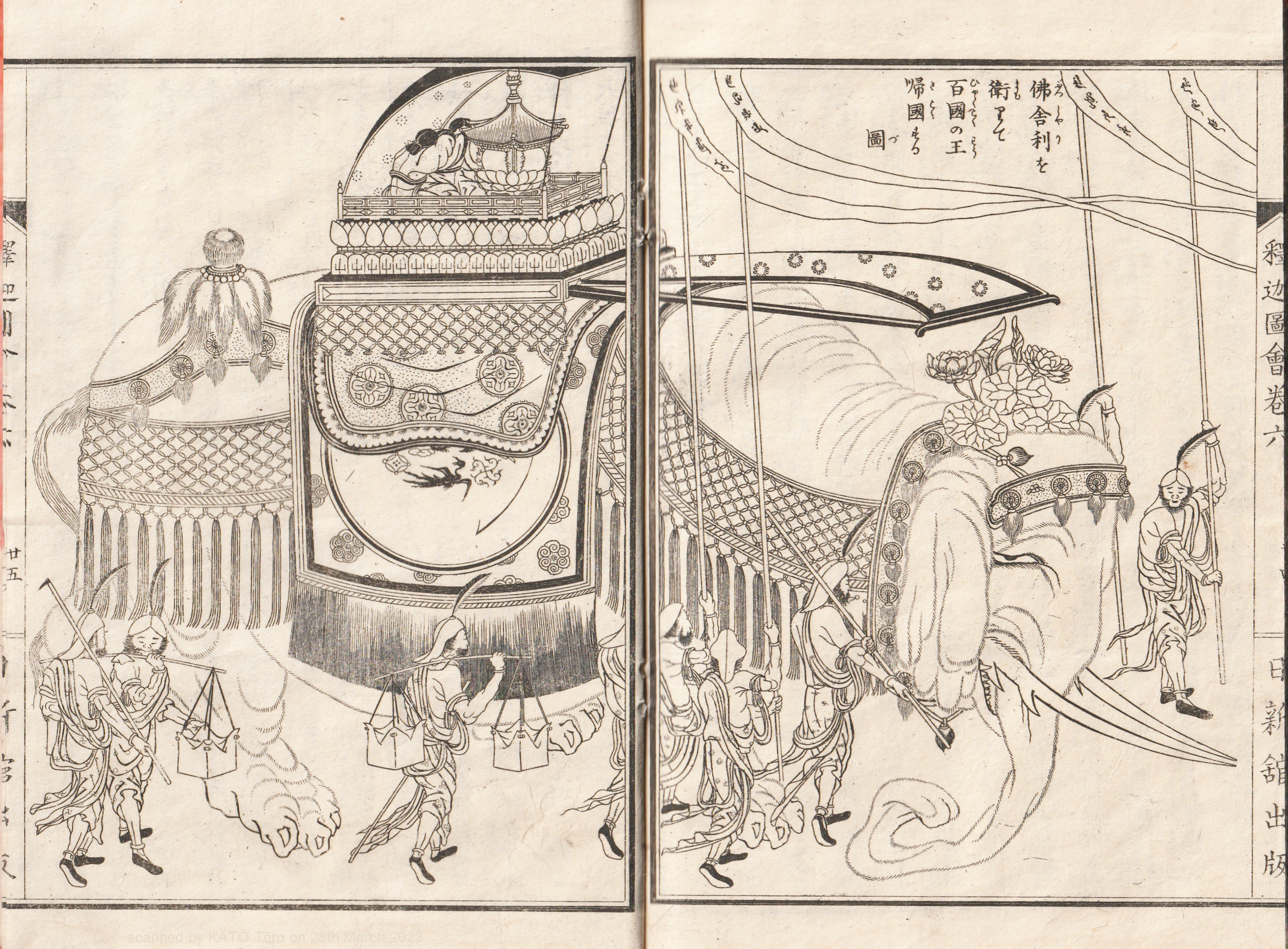
They divided śarīras and carried it to their kingdoms. Illustration by Hokusai

Although the term śarīra can be used to refer to a wide variety of Buddhist relics, as listed above, it is generally used to refer to pearl or crystal-like bead-shaped objects that are purportedly found among the cremated ashes of Buddhist spiritual masters.

These objects are considered relics of significant importance in many sects of Buddhism since they are believed to embody the spiritual knowledge, teachings, realizations or living essence of spiritual masters. They are taken as evidence of the masters' enlightenment and spiritual purity. Some believe that śarīras are deliberately left by the consciousness of a master for veneration, and that the beauty of the śarīras depends on how well the masters had cultivated their mind and souls. Śarīra come in a variety of colours, and some are even translucent.

Sariras are typically displayed in a glass bowl inside small gold urns or stupas as well as enshrined inside the master's statue. Śarīras are also believed to mysteriously multiply while inside their containers if they have been stored under favorable conditions. Saffron threads are sometimes placed within or around the bowl containing individual śarīra as an offering.

In the Korean Samguk yusa it is said that the monk Myojong received a śarīra from a turtle which caused others to treat the monk better.

The occurrence of śarīra is not restricted to ancient times, and many Buddhists have shown that śarīra are not limited to humans or masters. Many texts of Pure Land Buddhism report śarīras of many adherents, some occurring recently. Some Buddhists associate a student's spiritual life with the amount and condition of the śarīra they leave after cremation. Many Pure Land Buddhists believe Amitābha's power manifests cremated remains into śarīra. Many claim that pearls of śarīra rain at the funerals of eminent monks. There are reports that śarīra may appear, multiply or disappear, depending on a keeper's thoughts. One's vow may also be important. One legend holds that the translator Kumārajīva wanted to demonstrate that his translations were not false; as a result his tongue remained intact after cremation.

== Scientific analysis ==
There is evidence that under certain conditions of heating, human bones can form crystalline structures.

== Documentary films ==
Pearl relics are documented in the 2008 film, Unmistaken Child, among the cremation ashes of Geshe Lama Konchog.

== In Javanese language ==
Javanese has a strong historical bond with the Hindu tradition and Sanskrit liturgical language. Śarīra is also used in Archaic (Kawi) Javanese, preserving its original meaning of 'body' or 'human body'. The word also finds its way into the modern Javanese language as "slira" with the same meaning. "Sliramu" (strictly translated as 'your body') and "sliraku" (strictly translated as 'my body') are usually used in poems or songs to replace "you" and "I", respectively. The word is not common but is used in both oral and written contexts.

== See also ==
- Cetiya
- Burmese pagoda
- Rainbow body
- Relics associated with Buddha
