= Zopa (disambiguation) =

Zopa is a British financial services company.

Zopa or ZOPA may also refer to:

- Zone of possible agreement, a business theory term dealing with negotiations
- Thubten Zopa Rinpoche (born 1946), Tibetan lama
- Tenzin Zopa (born 1975), Tibetan Buddhist monk
- Zopa, an art-rock band fronted by actor Michael Imperioli
