= Pep Williams =

American artist (born 1971)

- Born: May 25, 1971 (age 55); Los Angeles, California, U.S.
- Occupations: Photographer, director, skateboarder
- Website: pepwilliams.com

Pep Williams is an American fine art and street photographer, director, entrepreneur, and former professional skateboarder who grew up in South Central Los Angeles, California. He has traveled globally creating material for his photographic exhibitions. He is one of the only photographers to have ever been granted access into the California State Prison System where he created a series of inmate portraitures entitled, Behind Bars.

Williams has worked sporadically in the music industry working with the A&R departments with such labels as Death Row Records and Interscope Records. From this music business background he later transitioned into photographing artists such as; Chris Brown, Nick Cannon, Offset, and Suicidal Tendencies. He has been published in many fashion, music, and lifestyle magazines such as W magazine, Thrasher Magazine, Inked Magazine, Breaks, One West, Mass Ink, Urban Ink Magazine, etc.

His images have been shown in galleries in Japan, Portugal, Brazil, Germany, and the US and he is associated with charity art organizations such as The Art of Elysium.

== Life and career ==
A third-generation Dogtown skater, Williams started skateboarding in 1975 at the age of four and throughout his youth was influenced by important Californian skaters of the time such as; close friends Jay Adams, Christian Hosoi, Aaron Murray, Natas Kaupas, Julien Stranger, Eric Dressen, and Kareem Campbell. Williams himself went on to become a pro skateboarder within the industry, appearing on a 1991 cover of Thrasher Magazine, and numerous advertisements in many magazines and commercials.

Being a visible skateboarder led to modeling work for his sponsors in international fashion shows and photoshoots, where Williams was often surrounded by skilled photographers, whom he observed acutely.

Williams began working as a professional photographer in 1996 when a photographer who had been scheduled to document a fashion show that he was doing as a model was booked on another job and couldn't attend. As the designer was desperately searching for a replacement, it was revealed that the job paid six-thousand dollars. Seizing the opportunity, Williams immediately declared to the designer, "I'm also a photographer" and was hired on the spot, even with the absence of an actual photographer's portfolio. He made it through that first job with the help of a skilled photographic assistant he hired to handle the technicalities, something he had observed notable photographers do innumerable times. More jobs followed, but as he came into his own as a photographer, he found himself rapidly tiring of the fashion world and began to focus on fine art portraiture, mostly of his friends; skaters, musicians, artists, drug dealers and gang members.

== The Perfect Storm ==
"The Perfect Storm". This image came about when Williams was spending time with Jay Adams in Oahu on the North Shore in 2010. This was a candid image, Jay Adams being unaware of it being clicked. Moments before the image was taken Jay was giving advice on life and relationships to a young girl sitting on the ground next to him. The phone rang and she left to answer it. Williams was sitting across from Jay and saw a look come over his face. It was like he was going over everything in his head what he had just told the young girl. The camera was sitting in Williams's lap, and he was hoping the camera was in focus and begin to shoot 3 frames from his lap.

Williams reached out to RISK to paint on the image. RISK knew Jay well and what he stood for. "There was really no other person I thought of to paint on the image. There is only one, RISK." —Pep Williams.

== Behind Bars (Autry Museum Exhibit) ==
Behind Bars is a photographic series photographed by Williams on display in a permanent exhibit at the Autry Museum of the American West in Los Angeles. The photographs are shot inside the Prisons in California. He was one of a few photographers to have ever been allowed inside to shoot the inmates freely. And as a former pro skateboarder, he was allowed to bring skateboards inside the grounds and actually let the inmates skate. This had never been done before. The images from the Behind Bars exhibit have been exhibited and lectured about at Leica Los Angeles, the University of California, Irvine, Alberta Rose Theater in Oregon and Adidas headquarters in Germany.

== Museum exhibits ==
- 2010: California African American Museum (CAAM) - "How We Roll"
- 2017: Museum of Latin American Art (MOLLA)
- 2020: Autry Museum of the American West (Permanent Exhibit)

== Group exhibitions ==
- 2011: Curbs and Stoops - Brooklyn
- 2017: Photoville - Brooklyn
- 2018: Good Art HLYWD - Los Angeles (with Shepard Fairey)

== Music videos ==
- 2013: Suicidal Tendencies - "Cyco Style" (director)
- 2017: Suicidal Tendencies - "Live for Life" (director)
