= Deaf Jam =

- Theatrical release poster
- Directed by: Judy Lieff
- Produced by: Judy Lieff: Steve Zeitlin
- Starring: Aneta Brodski: Tahani Salah
- Cinematography: Melissa Donovan: Claudia Raschke-Robinson
- Edited by: Keiko Deguchi
- Distributed by: CINEPHIL
- Release date: March 13, 2011 (Thessaloniki Documentary Festival)
- Running time: 70 minutes
- Country: United States
- Language: English: American Sign Language

Deaf Jam is a 2011 documentary film directed and produced by American filmmaker Judy Lieff. The film centers on the experience of Aneta Brodski, a deaf teenager living in Queens, New York, who becomes immersed in the dynamic and three-dimensional form of American Sign Language poetry. When Aneta, an Israel-born ASL poet, eventually meets Tahani, a Palestinian, spoken word poet, the two begin to collaborate, creating a new form of poetry that gains recognition in deaf and hearing communities alike.

Deaf Jam premiered on PBS's Independent Lens program, and was awarded the 2012 Japan Prize for the Best Work of the Youth Category. "Deaf Jam" is a co-production of Made-By-Hand, LLC and the Independent Television Service (ITVS).

== Plot ==
Aneta Brodski is first exposed to American Sign Language (ASL) poetry through an after-school program at the Lexington School for the Deaf in Queens. Aneta is an Israeli immigrant, and unlike many of her classmates, was born to an all-Deaf family. She is dedicated to the study ASL poetry, and by the end of the first year, has begun to master the three-dimensional form and cultivate a strong poetic voice.

The following year, when the program expands its scope and moves to a space shared with Urban Word, an organization at the forefront of the youth spoken word movement, Aneta becomes interested in performing her poetry for Hearing audiences. She competes for a spot on the Urban Word slam team, an unprecedented move for a member of the Deaf community. Although Aneta is proud of her deafness, she explains that she does not wish to be defined by it, but would like to have the opportunity to express herself in spheres beyond the Deaf community.

Through her activity at Urban Word, Aneta eventually meets Tahani Salah, a Palestinian spoken word poet, and the two young women begin to collaborate, creating a new form of slam poetry that transcends the politics of their respective national origins. After an arduous process of synthesis, Aneta and Tahani are invited to present their poetry at Bob Holman’s Bowery Poetry Club.

== Release ==
Deaf Jam premiered on PBS's Independent Lens program, in the 2011-2012 season, and has broadcast internationally on the German BR's magazine "Sehen statt Hören," Korea's EBS, Swiss Television and the Taiwanese Ski Digi Entertainment Co.

The film was an official selection at the Woodstock Film Festival, 13 Thessaloniki Documentary Festival, Boston Jewish Film Festival, and the Starz Denver Film Festival in 2011. In 2012 Deaf Jam was officially selected to screen at Documentary Edge Film Festival New Zealand, 35th Goteborg International Film Festival in Sweden, San Sebastopol Documentary Film Festival, San Diego Jewish Film Festival, Atlanta Jewish Film Festival, New York Jewish Film Festival, San Francisco Independent Film Festival, Houston Jewish Film Festival, Pittsburg Jewish Film Festival, Westchester Jewish Film Festival at the Jacob Burns Film Center, Arts in Action Film Festival in Australia, EBS International Documentary Festival in Korea, Maine Deaf Film Festival, Project Youth View in Oakland, California, One World Arts Festival in Canada, Festival CIneSordo in Ecuador, CineDeaf Roma in Italy, and the Toronto Jewish Film Festival.

== Reception ==
Deaf Jam was honored with the NHK sponsored Japan Prize for the Best Work of the Youth Category, in 2012. It was also awarded the prize for Best Documentary at the Greenpoint Film Festival and The Greater Reading Film Festival, as well as Best Film at The Irish Deaf Festival in Dublin. In 2013, Deaf Jam was invited to participate in the American Film Showcase, an initiative by the State Department's Bureau of Educational and Cultural Affairs that sends filmmakers to selected countries to represent an independent view of American culture and society.

The film has received positive reviews in the critical press. Reporting on the Thessaloniki Documentary Film Festival in the Huffington Post, Karin Badt called Deaf Jam a "riveting documentary" and remarks that "the deaf Israeli teenager at the center of the film, Aneta Brodski, is so charmingly expressive." Reporting for Variety, Boyd Van Hoeij wrote, "ASL poetry relies heavily on visuals and movement, and Lieff's film follows suit, with lensing on a variety of digital formats, colorful tech wizardry and fast-paced cutting. A hip soundtrack further adds to the pic's street cred for hearing auds."
