= Buddha Tooth Relic Temple and Museum =

Buddhist temple and museum in Singapore

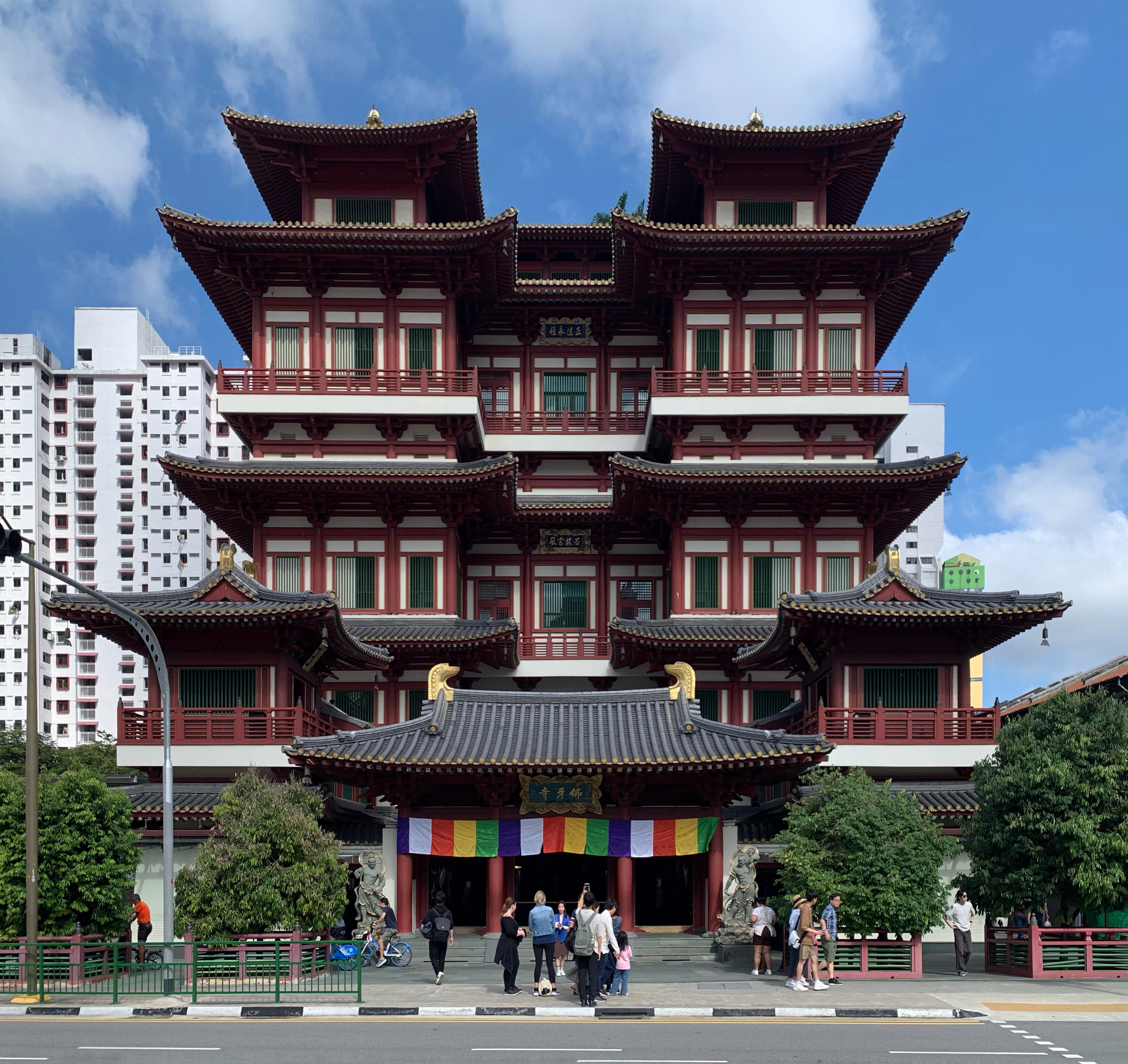
- Front facade of the Buddha Tooth Relic Temple and Museum as seen from across the South Bridge Road, 2025

Religion
- Affiliation: Buddhism

Location
- Location: 288 South Bridge Road; Singapore 058840
- Country: Singapore
- Interactive map of Buddha Tooth Relic Temple and Museum

Architecture
- Completed: 2007; 19 years ago

Website
- Buddha Tooth Relic Temple and Museum

The Buddha Tooth Relic Temple and Museum (Chinese: 新加坡佛牙寺龍華院) is a Buddhist temple and museum complex located in the Chinatown district of Singapore. The temple's monastics and devotees officially practice Chinese Buddhism.

== Overview ==
The temple was built based on the Chinese Buddhist architectural style of the Tang dynasty (as well as incorporating slight Japanese and Tibetan Buddhist influences in certain rooms) to house the tooth relic of the historical Buddha. It is claimed that the relic of Buddha from which it gains its name was found in a collapsed stupa. The size of the tooth – measuring 7.5 cm – is also far too long for a human tooth. The relic can be viewed by the public at the 4th floor of the temple.

The basement of the temple holds a theatre and a vegetarian dining hall that serve complimentary meals, though donations are accepted.

== History ==
Ven. Shi Fa Zhao, the current president and abbot of Buddha Tooth Relic Temple and Museum, was approached by STB to redevelop the temple. Besides stipulating the building design to be 'traditional', it is also requested that the temple contains facilities and hold events for both locals and tourists.

The temple had gone through a total of nine proposals before its design was finalized. The abbot rejected a design that was too 'contemporary', therefore, deemed out of place in the Chinatown landscape. He also rejected a design with Southern Chinese typology, which is the style adopted by temples with a long history in Chinatown. As such, a temple with Southern China architecture would have been an authentic reflection of the migrant history of Singapore. The design of the temple has a Northern Chinese style with strong influences from the Chinese Buddhist architectural style of the Tang Dynasty.

Shi Fa Zhao is also the founder of the Metta Welfare Association, a non-profit voluntary welfare organization (VWO) that provides special education, welfare services, community and medical care to the intellectually disabled, elderly and terminally ill in society.

== Temple outline ==
=== First floor ===
Shanmen (Chinese: 山門; pinyin: Shānmén): Meaning "Mountain Gate". This is a traditional temple gateway that has 3 large, heavy, red lacquered doors in accordance with traditional Tang Dynasty style architecture. It acts as the main entrance to the temple and is fitted with gilt bronze studs, engraved plates and lion door knockers. The entry via the center gate is restricted, usually reserved for important guests.

Hundred Dragon Hall (Chinese: 百龍殿; pinyin: Bǎilóng-diàn): This main hall has a height of 27-feet to accommodate a 15-feet statue of the Buddha Maitreya enshrined within, which is flanked by two bodhisattvas on each side. The statue of the Buddha sits on a throne in a bhadrasana posture, with each feet lying atop a lotus flower. The statue's right hand is raised to form the abhaya mudra (symbolizing protection, benevolence, peace and dispelling of fear), and the left hand is raised to form the varada mudra (symbolizing offering, giving, welcome, charity compassion and sincerity), with a golden water bottle (kundika) containing the amrita, placed in the left palm.

Universal Wisdom Hall (Chinese: 圓通殿; pinyin: Yuántōng-diàn): This hall enshrines the Cintamanicakra manifestation of the Bodhisattva Guanyin, sitting atop an elaborate lotus throne and flanked on each side by vajra-wielding dharmapalas. The statue has six hands, each holding a particular item or forming a particular mudra, which are symbolic of the six realms of saṃsāra. The Heart Sutra, written in the Siddham script, is embroidered on the rear wall of the hall, along with embroidered patterns of lotuses waving in the breeze. Adorning the walls of the hall are shrines and statues of a grouping of eight Buddhas, Bodhisattvas and Wisdom Kings traditionally assigned as protectors of Buddhists born under one of the Twelve Chinese Zodiac signs, surrounded by smaller Cintamanicakra statues.

=== Mezzanine ===
Dharma Hall (Chinese: 法堂; pinyin: Fǎtáng): This hall enshrines a statue of Nanhai Guanyin, meaning "Guanyin Of The Southern Seas", another manifestation of the Bodhisattva Guanyin. The statue is portrayed as reclining in a relaxed rājalīlā pose meditating on Mount Putuo. The two opposite sides of the hall in front of the statue are adorned by tablets which are inscribed with the names of the temple's sponsors who contribute towards the operations of the temple.

Eminent Sangha Museum (Chinese: 戒光館; pinyin: Jièguāng guǎn): This small museum details the biographies of several eminent monks, both local and foreign, who made notable contributions towards social service, charity works as well as Buddhist studies.

Ancestral Hall (Chinese: 地藏殿; pinyin: Dìzàng-diàn): This hall enshrines a statue of the Bodhisattva Kṣitigarbha, who is regarded by Chinese Buddhists to be responsible for helping to bring about salvation to beings who are reincarnated in Diyu (hell). Surrounding the statue are ancestral tablets enshrined in this hall.

=== Second floor ===
Mañjuśrī Hall (Chinese: 文殊殿; pinyin: Wénshū-diàn): This hall enshrines a statue of the Bodhisattva Mañjuśrī. The statue is depicted in the sattvaparyanka posture, sitting cross-legged in a half-vajra posture with the left leg resting on the right leg on a three-tiered lotus pedestal, above an eight-legged throne. Mañjuśrī's mount, a black-skinned crouching lion with golden beard, eyebrows, claws, tassels and mouth agape showing fangs, is depicted as lurking beneath the throne. Statues of sixteen dharmapalas are also enshrined, surrounding the statue of Mañjuśrī. This floor also contains the Aranya Gallery, consisting of the Aranya Reference Library, the temple's History Gallery and the Aranya Buddhist Culture Shop as well as the Aranya Sutra Chamber, where a copy of the Mahāprajñāpāramitā Sūtra is kept.

=== Third floor ===
Nagapuspa Buddhist Culture Museum (Chinese: 龍華文物館; pinyin: Lónghuá Wénwù Guǎn): This museum, in contrast to the rest of the temple, is designed as a less overtly religious environment. It has a total of 278 exhibits, ranging from modern expressionistic works to 2nd and 3rd century Gandharan statuary. The various exhibits stem from Gandhara, India, Nepal, Tibet, China, Korea, Japan, Thailand and Myanmar, comprising sculpture, paintings and textiles. Three main themes run through the museum. The largest, occupying half the exhibition space, is a hagiographic narration of Buddha Shakyamuni's life. The other half is dedicated to Buddha Maitreya and Bodhisattva Avalokiteshvara. Related artifacts with explanatory panels and laminated booklets illustrate each theme. Two maps constitute a large panel facing an altar of Bodhisattva Samantabhadra: one details the spread of Buddhism in Asia and the other shows fifty-five Buddhist centers in Singapore.

Samantabhadra Hall (Chinese: 普賢殿; pinyin: Pǔxián-diàn): This hall enshrines a statue of the Bodhisattva Samantabhadra. The statue is depicted as sitting in the padmasana posture, on a lotus pedestal, above an elephant throne. The elephant throne consists of 4 elephants, with each one of the Four Heavenly Kings (lokapala) atop each elephant, as well as a myriad of smaller elephants at the lowest tier. The statue of Samantabhadra has 20 arms, with each arm holding different Buddhist implements. The main right hand holds a vajra and the main left hand holds a lotus. A round aureole is depicted as radiating behind his body and head and his crown is adorned with images of the Five Tathāgatas. This hall also houses the statue of ten rakshasis who are depicted as guarding the bodhisattva.

Sacred Buddha Relics Chamber (Chinese: 佛陀舍利子展覽館; pinyin: Fótuó Shèlìzǐ Zhǎnlǎn Guǎn): This chamber is an extension of the Nagapuspa Buddhist Culture Museum where tiny pearl-like multi-colored relics purportedly of the Buddha are displayed alongside cognate artifacts such as reliquaries and stupas. Other temples in Singapore with the relics associated with Buddha are the Foo Hai Ch'an Monastery near Paya Lebar MRT Exit C, Kong Meng San Phor Kark See Monastery in Bishan, Thekchen Choling at Jalan Besar, Sri Lankaramaya Buddhist Temple at St. Michael’s Road in Bandemeer.

=== Fourth floor ===
Sacred Light Chamber (Chinese: 靈光殿; pinyin: Língguāng-diàn): This chamber is the repository of the Buddha Tooth Relic. The stupa housing the relic is enshrined in the center of the chamber, with a mandala depicting the Buddha Vairocana adorning the ceiling above the stupa, and statuettes of 36 dragons adorning the stupa's base. The ceiling is cordoned by gilt flower garland offering lamps and a jewel netting. The walls of the chamber are adorned with painted images of the Twenty Devas and the floor is lined with gold tiles. The main dome of the stupa is decorated with 7 parasols, with many Burmese jeweled bangles dangling from the last parasol. Below the dome are 189 sets of gemstones such as emeralds and rubies. A solid gold statue of the Buddha Maitreya sits at the center of the stupa. The statue reclines in the bhadrasana posture on a throne, with each feet resting on a lotus, symbolic of royalty. The hands of the statue are posed forming the dharmacakra mudra. A round aureole radiates behind the statue's head. On the lowest tier of the stupa lies the intricately carved bas reliefs of the Thirty-Five Confession Buddhas, in pure gold. The dome ends on a circular base with engraved floral motifs and sits on a square platform. At the sides of the square platform are 8 gold panels with engravings depicting the various scenes of Sakyamuni Buddha's life, starting with the dream of Queen Maya and ending with the Buddha's attainment of Parinirvana. These panels are in traditional Gandharan style of the period. At each of the four corners of the platform, a pillar, modelled after the ones erected by King Ashoka, has been placed, with a lion statuette decorating the top of each pillar.

=== Roof ===
Ten Thousand Buddha Pagoda (Chinese: 萬佛閣; pinyin: Wànfó-gé): This pagoda is a pavilion located directly at the center of the roof where gilt statues of approximately 11,111 Buddhas and Bodhisattvas are enshrined and venerated. The statue of each Buddha or Bodhisattva is depicted as sitting in the padmasana posture on a phoenix throne, with their hands forming the dhyana mudra and a ring of flaming aureoles encircling their heads. At the center of the pagoda is a large Vairocana Buddha Prayer Wheel, which was inspired by the Tibetan Buddhist tradition. Within the prayer wheel, more than 3,000 calligraphed copies of the Vairocana Mantra have been placed. A statue of Vairocana is also enshrined within the pagoda.

Five Tathāgatas (Chinese: 五方佛; pinyin: Wǔfāng-fó): Statues of the Five Tathāgatas are enshrined in different pavilions on the roof, with their location corresponding to the cardinal direction the particular Buddha is traditionally associated with. Vairocana, associated with the center, is enshrined within the Ten Thousand Buddha Pagoda in the direct center of the roof. Amoghasiddhi, associated with the north, is enshrined within a pavilion on the northern side of the roof. Amitābha, associated with the west, is enshrined within a pavilion on the western side of the roof. Ratnasambhava, associated with the south, is enshrined within a pavilion on the southern side of the roof. Akshobhya, associated with the east, is enshrined within a pavilion on the eastern side of the roof.

Buddha of Infinite Life (Chinese: 無量壽佛; pinyin: Wúliàngshòu-fó): The walls of the pavilions on the roof have been inlayed with over 12,300 small statuettes of the Buddha of Infinite Life, Amitābha.

== Gallery ==
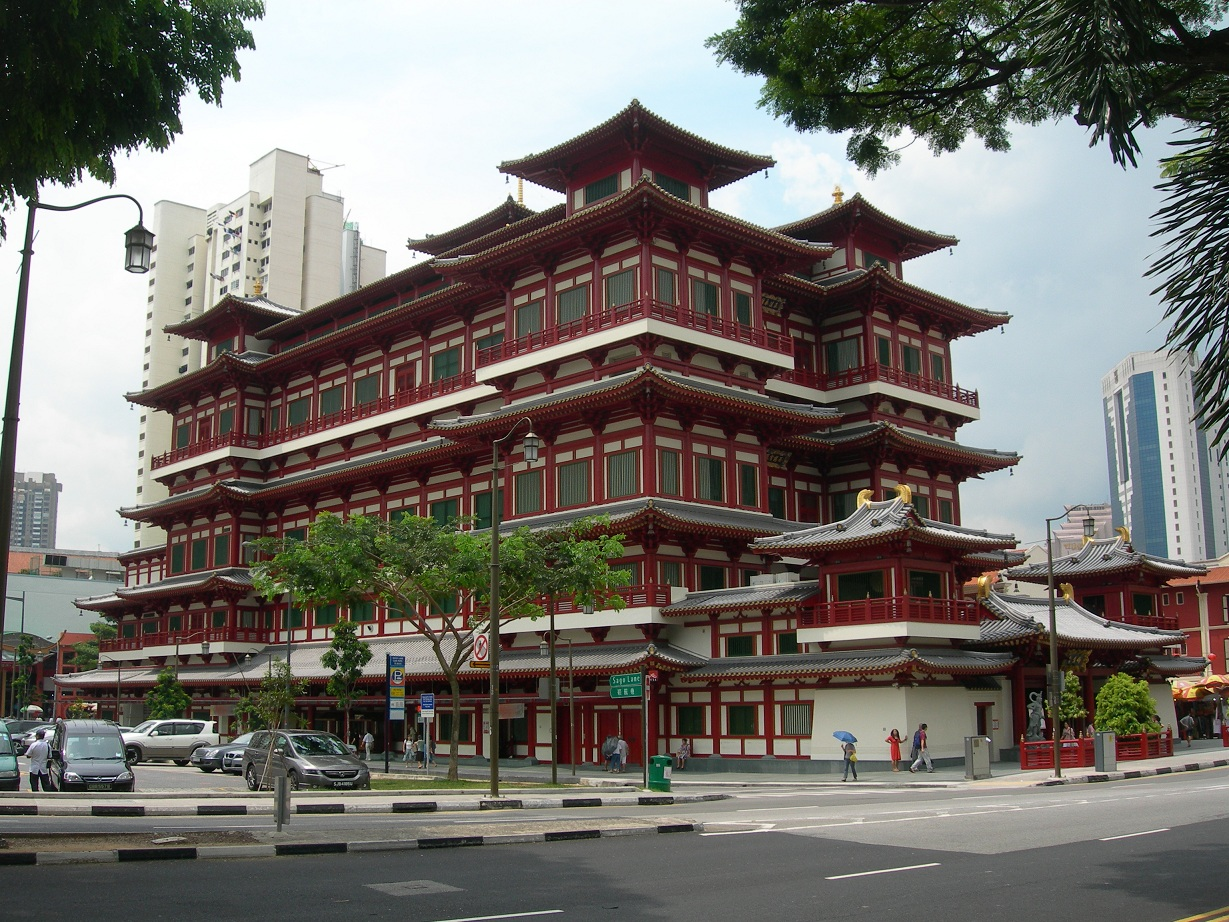
The Buddha Tooth Relic Temple from South Bridge Road

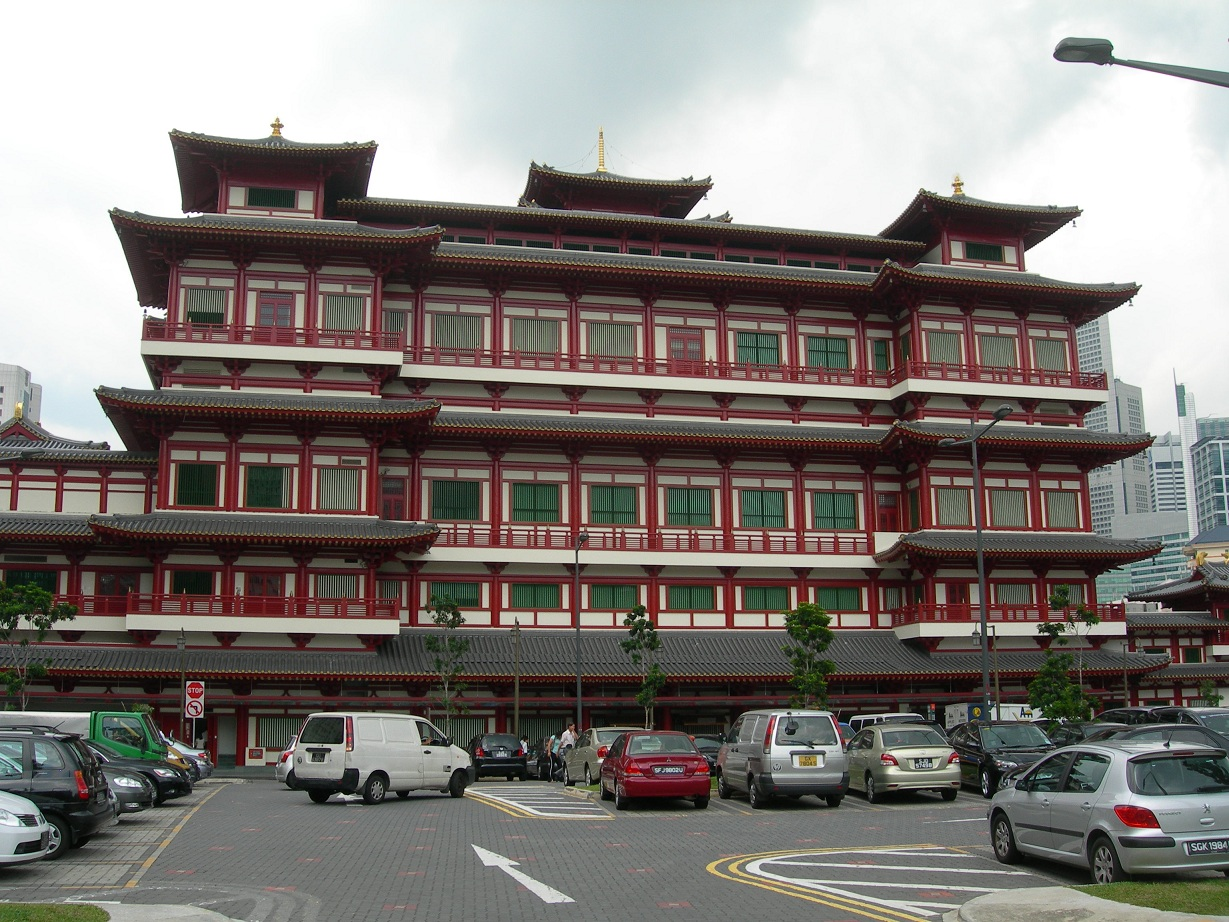
View of the side of the temple from the carpark

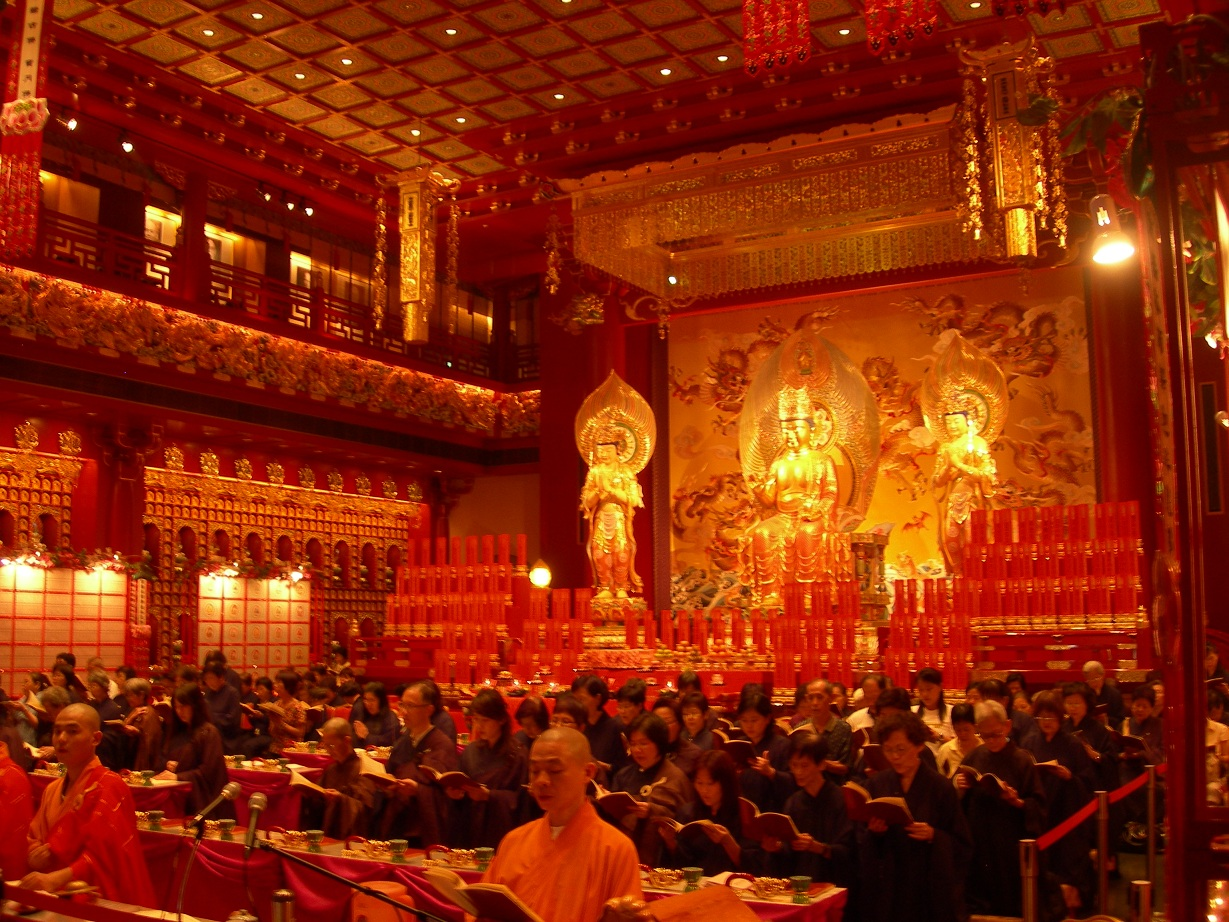
Inside of the Hundred Dragon Hall, showing a seated Buddha Maitreya flanked by two Bodhisattvas

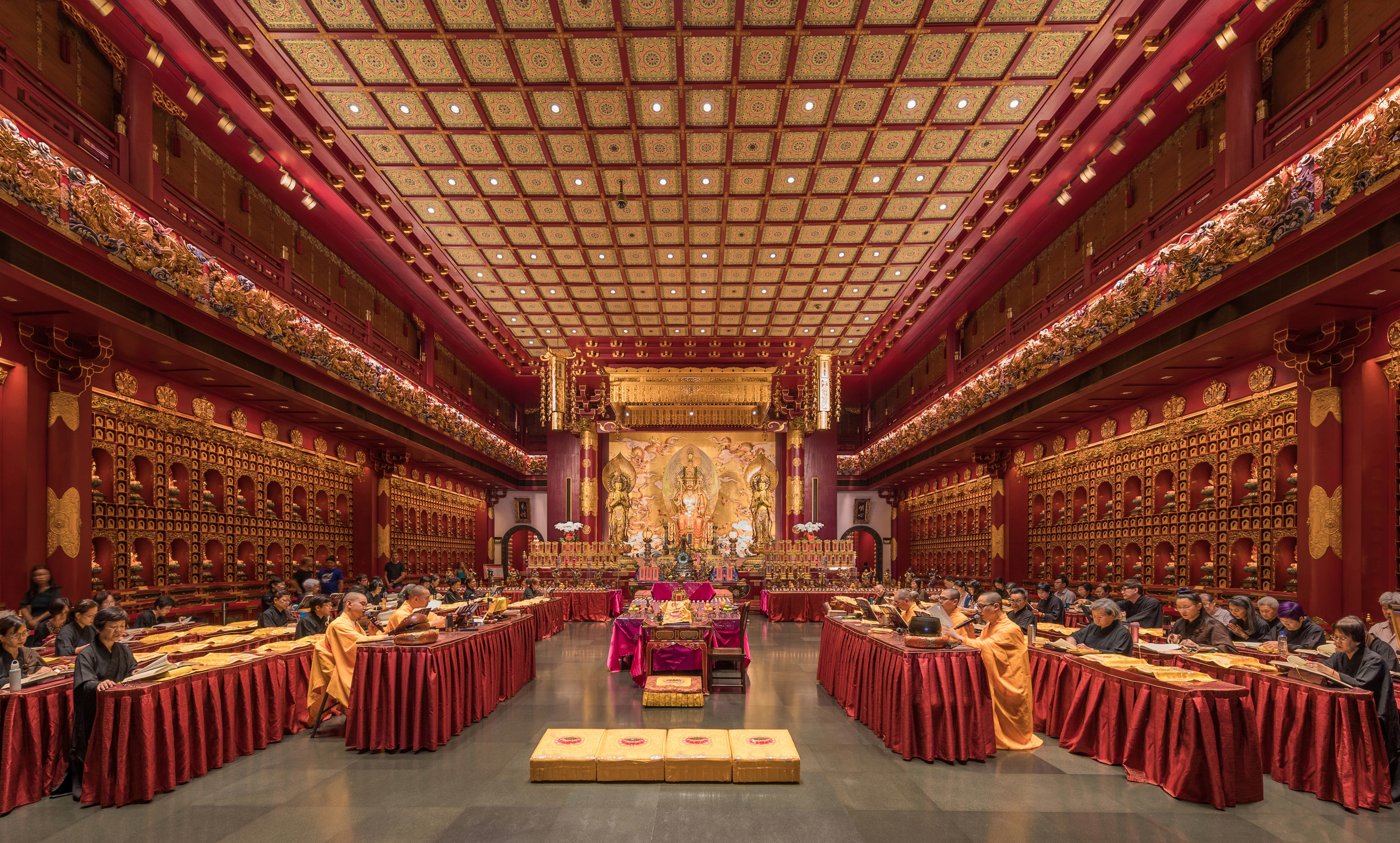
Praying monks and nuns in the temple with laypeople seated behind them in the Hundred Dragon Hall

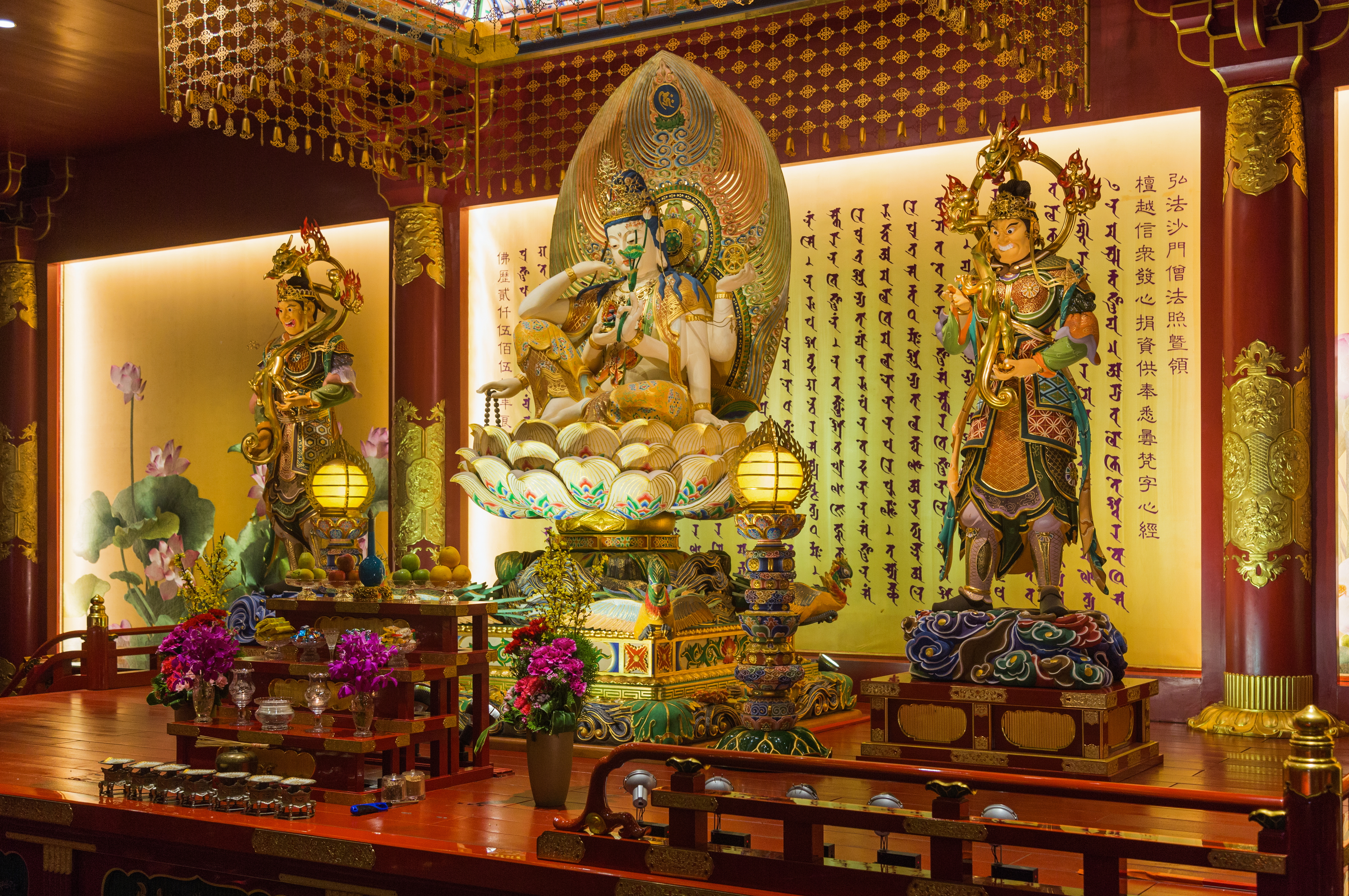
Shrine to Cintamanicakra (Chinese: 如意輪觀音; pinyin: Rúyìlún Guānyīn) within the Universal Wisdom Hall

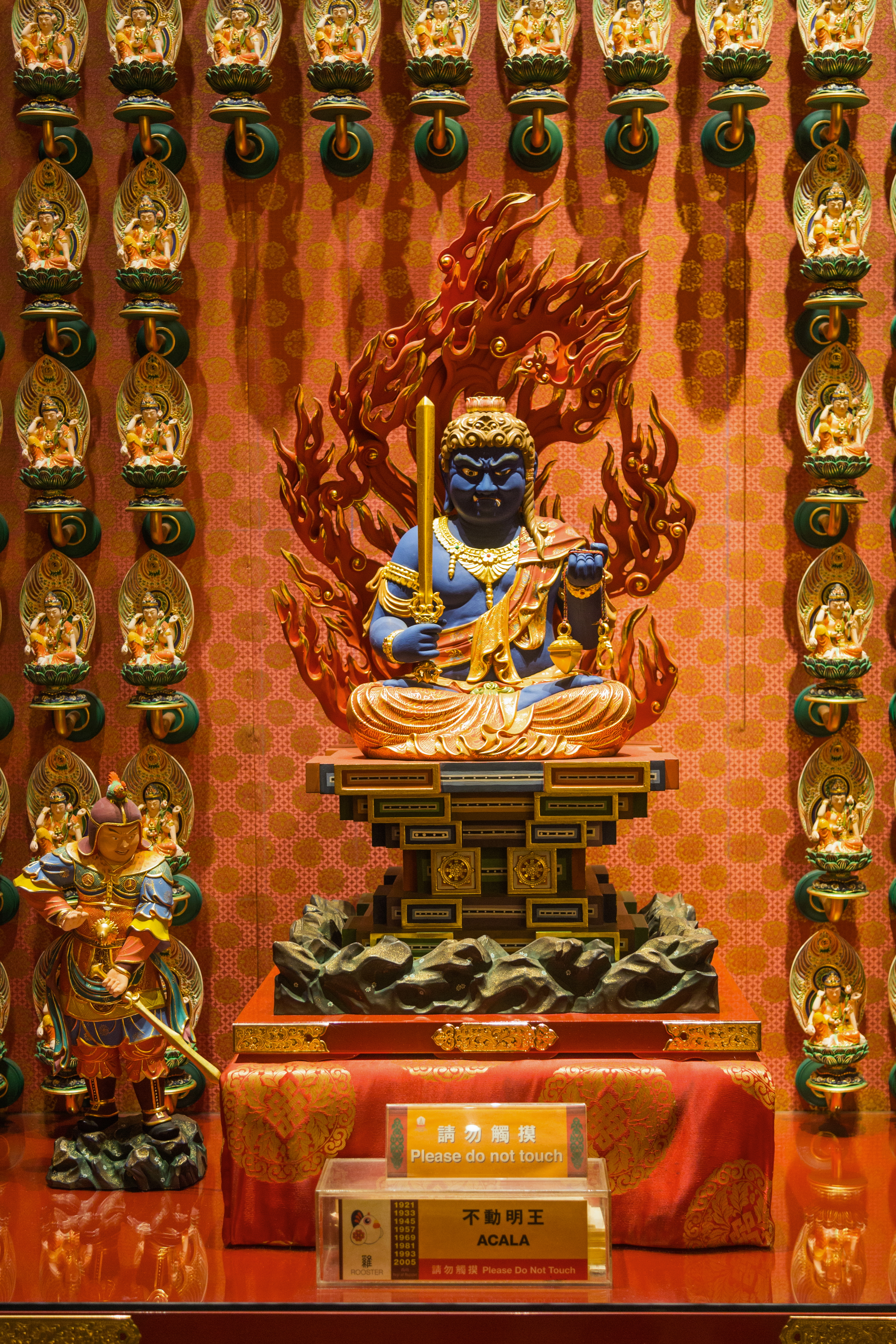
Shrine to Acala (Chinese: 不動明王; pinyin: Bùdòng Míngwáng), one of the eight Zodiac protectors, within the Universal Wisdom Hall

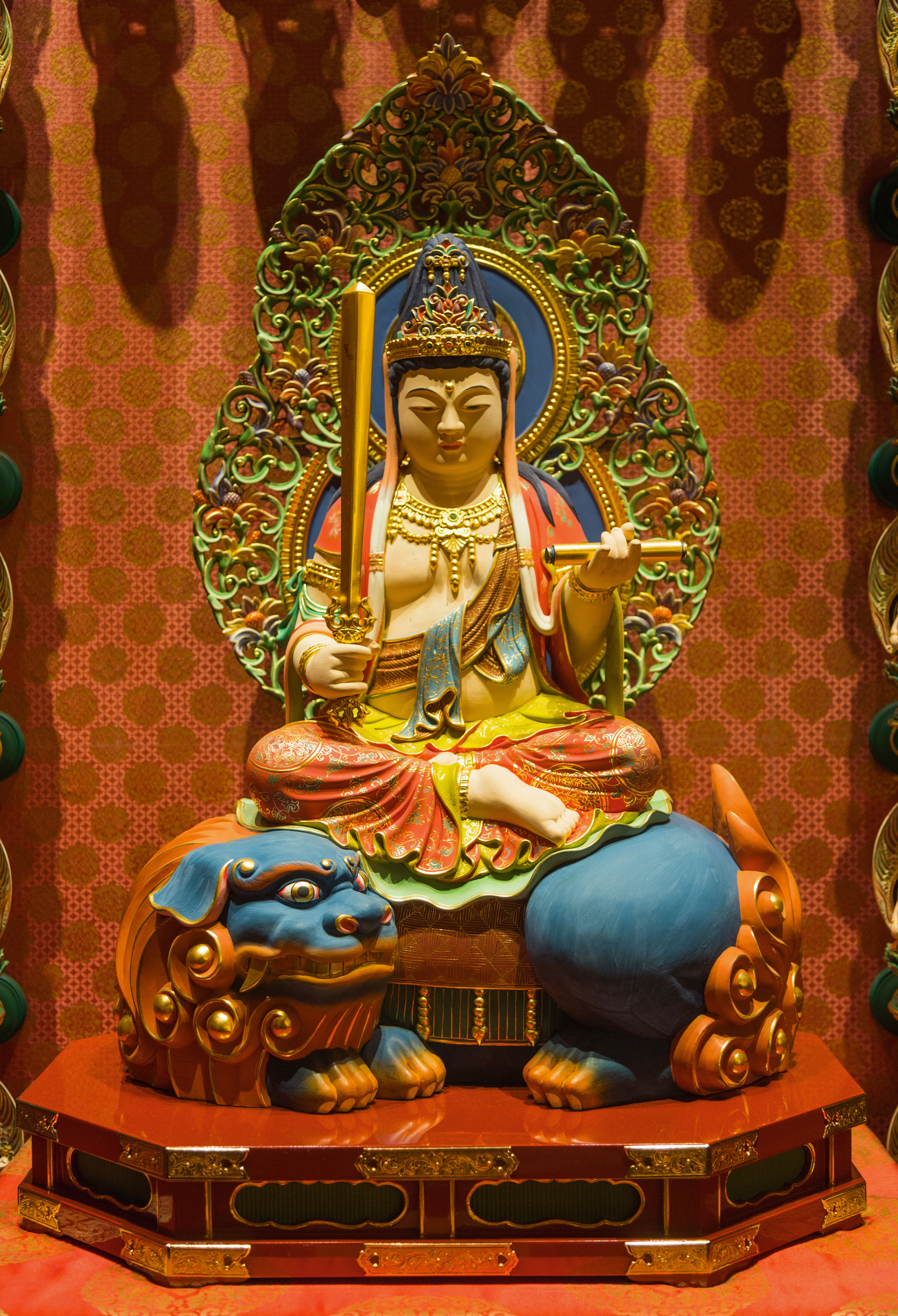
Shrine to Manjushri (Chinese: 文殊菩薩; pinyin: Wénshū Púsà), one of the eight Zodiac protectors, within the Universal Wisdom Hall

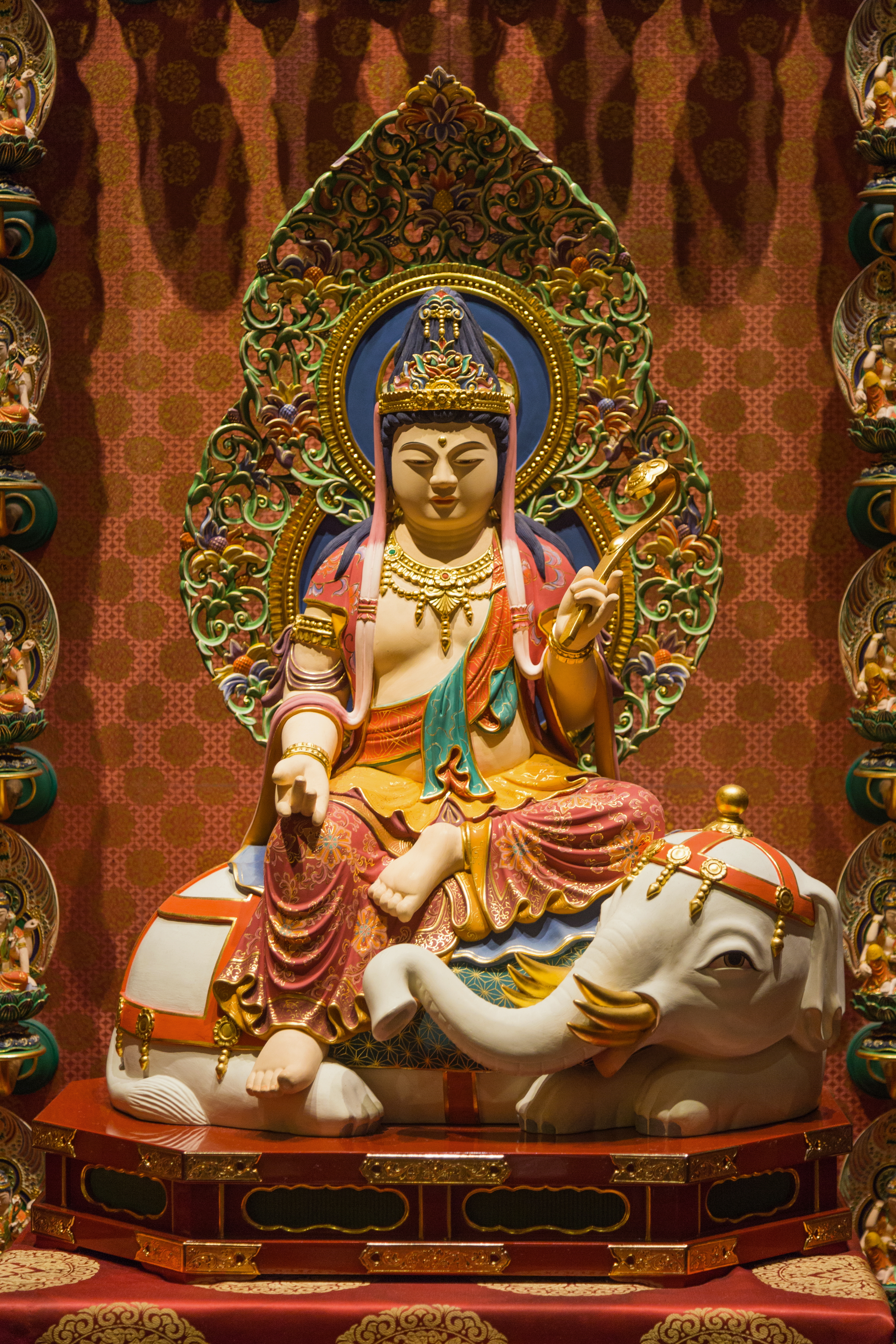
Shrine to Samantabhadra (Chinese: 普賢菩薩; pinyin: Pǔxián Púsà), one of the eight Zodiac protectors, within the Universal Wisdom Hall

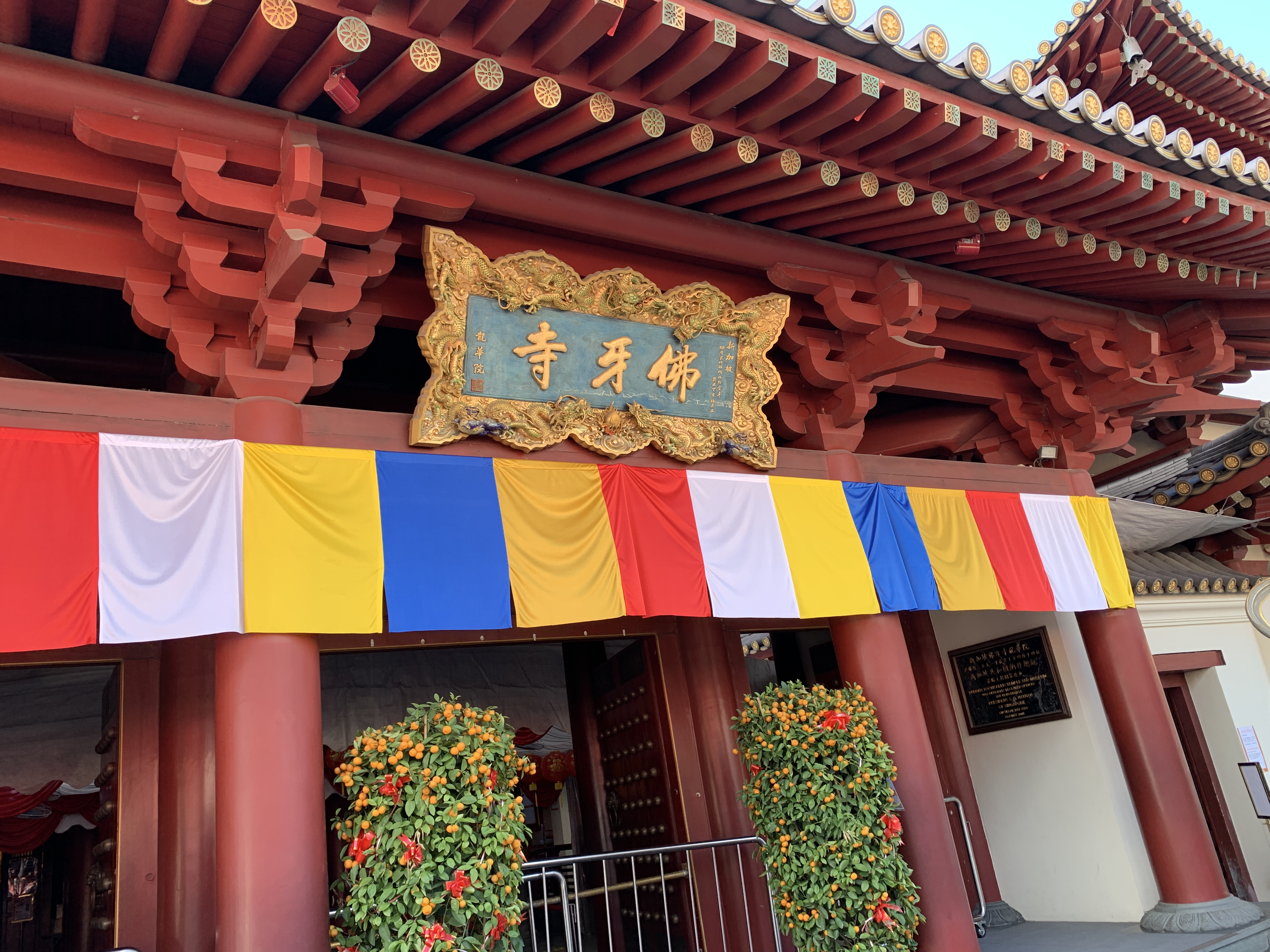
Back of the temple

== See also ==
- Buddhism in Singapore
- Relic of the tooth of the Buddha
- Temple of the Tooth
- Relics associated with Buddha
