= Ally Derks =

Dutch documentary curator

- Born: 1958 (age 67–68); Vorden, Netherlands
- Occupations: Documentary film curator, film festival director

Ally Derks is a documentary film curator and cinema industry professional from the Netherlands. She co-founded IDFA in 1988 and directed it for 30 years. Derks is nicknamed ‘Madam IDFA’ and ‘the High Priestess of Documentaries’ for her immense contribution to the world of documentary cinema.

== Career ==
=== IDFA ===
Derks studied Dutch literature, film and theater at Utrecht University.

In 1985, Ally Derks joined the team of Festikon, a festival of educational cinema founded by the Dutch Film Institute in 1961 and closed in 1987 due to the lack of interest of the audience. Menno van der Molen, Festikon's director, envisioned the new festival, entirely dedicated to documentaries, and invited Ally Derk to launch IDFA.

Only in 2001, she installed 7 official ‘pre-selectors’, the Dutch film professionals, who evaluated the submissions and chose 500 that would qualify for further evaluation by Derks. By 2016, the team of ‘viewers’ had been expanded to 20.

In 1998-2015, she also headed the IDFA Bertha Fund (formerly known as the Jan Vrijman Fund).

Derks headed IDFA from 1988 until 2017, when she stepped down. For her decades-long work in the industry, Derks was nicknamed ‘Madam IDFA’ and ‘the High Priestess of Documentaries.’ She shaped IDFA's program and profile for 30 years. Under Derks, the festival grew from a niche event with 80 documentary films and an audience of 3000 into a ten-day cinema event with an annual attendance of more than 270,000.

=== Other projects ===
During her decades-spanning career, Derks has been a member of many juries, including Sundance, Hotdocs, Silverdocs, and Nordisk Panorama. In 2015, she was the chairwoman of the EBS International Documentary Festival.

In 2017 she was offered a fellowship at the Robert Bosch Academy in Berlin. Since 2017, she has worked in Berlin as curator of the documentary programme of BUFA.

Derks remains active as a consultant. She was one of the advisors who helped to launch the Diane Weyermann Fellowship at Points North Institute.

In 2023, she was invited to the Academy of Motion Picture Arts and Sciences.

== Awards and recognition ==
In 2017, a section of IDFA titled Visual Voice was launched and dedicated personally to Derks.

In 2020, Russian director Victor Kossakovsky dedicated his Gunda documentary (produced by Joaquin Phoenix) to Ally Derks.

Her most notable awards are:

- 2017 – Officer in the Order of Orange-Nassau;
- 2016 – IDA Pioneer award;
- 2015 – Chevalier dans l’Ordre des Arts et Lettres;
- 2013 – Doc Edge International Super-Hero;
- 2011 – Hot Docs Doc Mogul Award;
- 2007 – Lifetime Achievement Award by Docaviv.

== Sources ==
- De Valk, Marijke (2010). "'And the winner is …' What happens behind the scenes of film festival competitions". International Journal of Cultural Studies. 13 (3): 290–307. doi:10.1177/1367877909359735.
