= Tenzin Zopa =

Tibetan Buddhist monk

Geshe Tenzin Zopa (born 1975) is a Tibetan Buddhist monk of the Mahayana tradition. He is the resident teacher of the Losang Dragpa Centre of the Foundation for the Preservation of the Mahayana Tradition (FPMT). Zopa is featured in the 2008 documentary film Unmistaken Child, which follows his search for the reincarnation of his beloved master, Geshe Lama Konchog. Zopa has also written a book about this search, titled Precious Holy Child of Kopan.

== Biography ==
Tenzin Zopa was born in 1975 in the Tsum Valley in Nepal, near where his future teacher Geshe Lama Konchog lived in an isolated mountain cave. His parents and family were simple, nomadic farmers. Geshe Lama Konchog attended Zopa's birth, and turned him to prevent a breech birth.

After a period of opposition from his father, who wanted him to marry and be a householder, at the age of seven Zopa joined Konchog as his disciple and closest assistant, and stayed with his master till Konchog's death in 2001. Konchog had taught Zopa the Tibetan alphabet when he was only two years old. As he grew, Konchog taught him various prayers, teachings on Buddhist philosophy, commentary, rituals, sutras, and tantra.

In 1984 at the age of nine, Zopa was ordained in the Kopan Monastery in Kathmandu, Nepal. There he studied Tibetan language, English, Nepali, art, lama dance, ritual, puja, and Buddhist philosophy. He also did a 6-month retreat with Geshe Lama Konchog back in the cave in Tsum. Zopa was singled out as a special spiritual student, and was not allowed to play with other young monks. Instead, his time was spent studying or in communion with Konchog and other high lamas.

Zopa escorted Konchog in all of his worldwide travels and teachings, and was also Konchog’s English translator.

In 1990, Zopa entered Sera Je Monastic University, and he lived there, whenever he was not traveling and studying with Konchog, until 2006. He was the top student in debate, writing, and memorization at Sera Je, and he always ranked among the top five students out of more than 5000 monks. In 2007 he completed his studies and graduated as Geshe. Zopa is one of the youngest Geshes (equivalent to a PhD or Doctor of Divinity) in Tibetan Buddhism. In his youth he skipped four grades, and the Dalai Lama let him take his final Buddhist exams four years ahead of schedule. He speaks fluent English, Tibetan, Nepali, and Hindi, and a little Mandarin.

== Current positions ==
From February 2007 until late 2011, Tenzin Zopa was appointed the resident teacher of the Losang Dragpa Centre in Malaysia, part of the Foundation for the Preservation of the Mahayana Tradition. He has many students worldwide. He is also project director of several monasteries and nunneries in the Tsum Valley of Nepal. In addition, he oversees the physical, mental, and spiritual development of Tulku Tenzin Phuntsok Rinpoche, the reincarnation of Geshe Lama Konchog. Zopa has authored several books and other publications.
