= Unmistaken Child =

- Directed by: Nati Baratz
- Cinematography: Yaron Orbach
- Music by: Cyril Morin
- Production companies: Samsara Films; Alma Films
- Distributed by: Oscilloscope
- Release dates: 8 September 2008 (Toronto International Film Festival); 3 June 2009 (United States)
- Running time: 102 minutes
- Languages: English; Tibetan; Nepali; Hindi
- Box office: $306,140

Unmistaken Child is a 2008 independent documentary film, which follows a Tibetan Buddhist monk's search for the reincarnation of his beloved teacher, a world-renowned lama. It was directed by Nati Baratz.

== Plot ==
The documentary follows a Tibetan Buddhist monk's search for the reincarnation of his beloved teacher, the world-renowned lama (master teacher) Geshe Lama Konchog. The filming, which began in October 2001, spans a time frame of five and a half years. It follows the deceased lama's closest disciple – a modest young monk named Tenzin Zopa, who speaks English well – as he seeks to find the child who is his master's reincarnation.

Because Tenzin is only a humble monk, he questions his ability to accurately find and recognize the reincarnation of an enlightened master. He is daunted by the difficulty of the task, for which he alone seems responsible.

Following a combination of prayer, intuition, and various forms of divination, Tenzin travels to the tiny villages of the remote Tsum Valley on the Nepal–Tibet border, and checks many families and many children. He seeks to find a young boy of the right age who responds emotionally to one of his former master's possessions. Still, many questions would remain, and many tests and trials must be met before the existence of a tulku – a reincarnated Tibetan master – could be confirmed. And even beyond the question of the confirmation of a reincarnation is the emotional toll involved in removing a small child from his loving parents and familiar village.

== Inception ==
The film was created, directed, and written by Israeli filmmaker Nati Baratz. He and his wife had attended a lecture given by Tenzin Zopa, who at the end asked everyone to pray for the location of the reincarnation of Geshe Lama Konchog, his recently deceased teacher.

"Tenzin really touched me in a profound way", Baratz said in an interview. "He has a huge heart, and he's very smart. And when I heard that he’s looking for the reincarnation of his master, I thought this is a movie I must make."

== Release, broadcast, and DVD ==
Unmistaken Child was first screened at the Toronto International Film Festival on September 8, 2008. Festival screenings in Berlin, San Francisco, and other festivals around the world followed. The film opened in limited theatrical release in the U.S. in June 2009, and subsequently in limited theatrical release around the world.

Unmistaken Child was selected for and aired on the award-winning PBS series Independent Lens in April 2010. Oscilloscope Laboratories published the film on DVD in 2009.

== Awards ==
Full Frame Documentary Film Festival

- Full Frame Inspiration Award
- Anne Dellinger Special Jury Award
- The Charles E. Guggenheim Emerging Artist Award – Honorable Mention

RiverRun International Film Festival

- Best Documentary

EBS International Documentary Festival

- Grand Prix
- Audience Award

Independent Film Festival Boston

- Special Jury Prize – Documentary

Camerimage

- Grand Prix – Feature Documentary Film

Haifa International Film Festival

- Best Documentary

Krakow Film Festival

- Golden Horn – Best Documentary
- Cracow Students Jury Award – Best Documentary

== See also ==
- Tenzin Phuntsok Rinpoche
- Tulku (film)
- My Reincarnation
- Pearl relics
