= IRQ =

IRQ may refer to:

- Interrupt request, a computer hardware signal
- Iraq (ISO 3166-1 country code)
- Qeshm Air (ICAO airline designator)
