= Irked Magazine =

Canadian multimedia website

IrkedMagazine.com is a multimedia website that publishes all kinds of socially conscious art relating to the emerging "culture of disability."

== History ==
Irked was founded by Sacha Vais in early May 2005. Judith Kovalski and Paul Aflalo came on board very soon thereafter, and they launched a rough coming soon page by the end of that month. A few months later, they were approached by a media studies professor at McGill University (Anita Nowak), who was interested in Irked, and on October 28, 2005, Professor Nowak’s class "went live" to the Irked website (her students were given an in-class Irked assignment to complete). That same month, its URL and mission statement were added to Psych Central, which is one of the Internet’s largest psychology sites. On May 1, 2006, The Montreal Gazette profiled Irked on the front page of its Arts & Life section, and the Irked website was flooded with hits and with submissions. The first issue of Irked Magazine was published on September 12, 2006. On November 30, 2006, Irked was featured in Halifax, Nova Scotia’s popular newspaper The Coast. Its second issue was published on February 9, 2007 and on February 12 Irked was profiled in the official blog for the National Film Board’s Citizen Shift initiative. Irked released its third issue in June 2007, its fourth issue in December 2007, and its fifth issue in March 2008. Instead of several issues a year, Irked is now updated weekly.

== Present day ==
The main offices of Irked are in Montreal, Quebec and Halifax, Nova Scotia. The current editor is Sacha Vais; the current multimedia director and talent scout is Paul Aflalo; the current in-house counsellor is Judith Kovalski.

Irked also has a growing list of ongoing contributors. These include, but are not limited to:

- David Roche — DavidRoche.com
- Stuart Baker-Brown — Onemansmountain.com
- Lewis Schofield — geekedmind.com
- Brian Segal — Irked staff writer
- Donna Williams — DonnaWilliams.net
- Elyse Bruce — ElyseBruce.com

== Typical Content ==
Irked’s website does not follow the typical e-magazine format. There is a wide variety of essays and articles, audio documentaries, video clips, photo galleries, animations, songs/music videos, radio broadcasts, slideshows, poetry, and paintings. The categories on IrkedMagazine.com allow for easy navigation and include:

- Art Gallery – a collection of the paintings, photographs, cartoons and other art featured on Irked Magazine.
- Interviews — this category contains all of the amazing interviews ever posted on Irked.
- QuIrked Kids — quick access to the mind-blowing Irked content submitted by children and young adults.
- Regular Contributors – an easy way to find the newest contributions from your favourite artists.
- Restroom Graffiti – love those thought provoking quotes scribbled anonymously on bathroom walls? The Restroom Graffiti category provides ample food for thought. Feel like procrastinating at work? Track down the source of the quote and post the answer as a comment.
- Irked Audio and Video – for those who like to listen or watch instead of read, these categories contain all of the audio (including podcasts) and video (including documentaries) ever published on Irked.

== Themes ==
One of the cornerstones of the Irked site is the "Themes" category. Currently, there are 19 Themes, including:

- Addictions
- Auties & Aspies
- Bard of the Benzodiazepines
- Blind Visionaries
- Bum Deal
- Cerebral Ballsy
- Deaf Jam
- Potanical Garden
- QuIrked Kids
- Shoutout From The Cutting Edge
- Slysdexia
- Standard Insomniatic Fare
- The Attention Defistress
- The Skinny on Fat
- The UpDown Report
- The Wandering Agoraphobe
- Top 10 Lists
- Tumour Humour
- Wheelchairman of the Board
