= EBS International Documentary Festival =

Documentary film festival in South Korea

Coordinates: 37°34′N 126°59′E

EBS International Documentary Festival (EIDF)
- Official poster
- Opening film: Dark Red Forest
- Location: Seoul, South Korea
- Founded: 2004
- Awards: Festival Choice (Competition): Global Grand Prize
- Hosted by: Educational Broadcasting System of South Korea
- No. of films: 63 films
- Festival date: Opening: 22 August 2022; Closing: 28 August 2022
- Language: Korean & International
- Website: EIDF

Current: 19th EBS International Documentary Film Festival
- 20th 18th

EBS International Documentary Festival also known as EIDF, is an annual film festival hosted by the Educational Broadcasting System of South Korea since 2004. It is "Asia’s prestigious documentary festival", with focus on highlighting documentary films on Asia or made in Asia. It is open to countries from around the world. In addition to screenings and broadcasts, EIDF events also include master classes and workshops.

15th edition of festival was held from August 20 to August 26, 2018. 72 films from 33 countries were screened during the event in theaters as well as through TV via EBS local news channels and live-streamed on YouTube and Facebook.

== History ==
Year	Date (Opening)	Date (Closing)	Opening Film	Number of Screening	Award-Winning Film
2004	August 30	September 5	Deconstruction of Korean Housewife	129 films 99 televised	Last Home Standing
2005	August 29	September 4	Another Myanmar, Mae Sot	98 films 94 televised	Bunso – The Youngest
2006	July 10	July 16	The Journey of Vaan Nguyen	83 films 83 televised	Out of Bounds
2007	August 27	September 2	Heimatklänge	58 films 54 televised	Puujee
2008	September 22	September 28	Encounters at the End of the World	43 films 43 televised	If We Knew
2009	September 21	September 27	Google Baby	50 films 50 televised	Unmistaken Child
2010	August 23	August 29	Planet of Snail	49 films 49 televised	Last Train Home
2011	August 19	August 25	How Are You Doing, Rudolf Ming?	51 films 43 televised	Marathon Boy
2012	August 17	August 24	Bully	48 films 34 televised	Private Universe
2013	October 18	October 25	Blackout	54 films 23 televised	Which Way Is the Frontline from Here?
2014	August 25	August 31	Alive Inside: A Story of Music & Memory	50 films 23 televised	Return to Homs
2015	August 24	August 30	Good Things Await	52 films 32 televised	La Once
2016	August 22	August 28	Brothers	53 films 30 televised	Natural Disorder
2017	August 21	August 27	Unarmed Verses	70 films 24 televised	Family in the Bubble
2018	August 20	August 26	Westwood: Punk, Icon, Activist	72 films most televised	The Distant Barking of Dogs
2019	August 17	August 25	Midnight Traveler	73 films most televised	Honeyland
2020	August 17	August 23	Maddy the Model	69 films most televised	Cinema Pameer
2021	August 23	August 29	First We Eat	64 films through EBS 1TV and D-BOX	The Jump
2022	August 22	August 28	Dark Red Forest	63 films through emu CINEMA and EBS 1TV	TBA

== Awards ==
  - Festival Choice Grand Prix (US$10,000) : Awarded to the most complete and elaborate documentary among the twelve nominees in the EIDF main competition
  - Edu Choice Grand Prix (US$10,000) : Awarded to the best documentary among the nominees in the EIDF 2012 main competition which provides refreshing insights for education as well
  - Spirit Award (US$7,000) : Awarded to the documentary among the twelve nominees for the EIDF main competition that best reveals the director's artistic spirit and genuine message according to the theme of each year's EIDF
  - Special Jury Award (US$5,000) : Awarded to the documentary among the twelve nominees for the EIDF main competition that shows outstanding approach in experimentation and form
  - UNICEF Special Award (US$5,000) : Among the existing entries, awarded to the films which contain children related contents or have hopeful messages for children
  - Audience Award (US$3,000) : Awarded to the documentary among the twelve nominees for the EIDF main competition that receives the most votes over the online and offline voting system

== Special Events ==
- Master's Class : The Master's Class offers special events for general audiences who have genuine interest in documentaries and documentary makers. The audience will be able to have a glimpse into the present state of documentary through filmmakers' and/or producers' own voices.
  - Master's Class of EIDF 2009 : Kaori Sakagami (Out of Frame: Search for Alternatives through Documentary Filmmaking), Thom Andersen (Get out of the Media) & Yves Jeanneau (Sunny or Cloudy?: International Co-Production)
- Director's Class : In the Director's Class, directors of Festival Choice will share their passion, experience and knowledge with festival participants, who will be able to obtain practical know-hows such as documentary production and filmmaking.
  - Director's Class of EIDF 2009 : Mary Katzke & Nati Baratz (Character Driven Documentary Storytelling), Karen Michael (Documentary of the Multiplatform Era), Andrei Dascalescu (Emerging Film Director), Sally Gutierrez Dewar (Micro-narratives, Gender and How We Document) & Stelios Koul (Finctional Documentary)
- Special Class : EIDF provides the special event of award-winning documentary makers with Korean participants from internationally known documentary film festivals such as HOTDOC and IDFA.
  - Special Class of EIDF 2009 : Simon El Habre, Award-winner of Best Documentary at HOTDOCs 2009 (For International Competence in Documentary-making: The Interaction of Structure and Editing)

== EIDF Documentary Fund (EDF) ==
EIDF has launched EIDF Documentary Fund (EDF) assisting projects to develop and supply documentary contents for better quality. EDF has attracted many documentary directors and reinforced the works of documentaries in development. EDF announced that the Best Choice of EIDF 2009 is The Hazy Journey of the Illuminating Tree directed by Yi Seung Jun, and the winner will gain the financial support of KRW 30,000,000. Moreover, the winner's final production will be shown on the 7th EIDF in 2010.

== Award-Winning Films in the Past ==
Edition	Summary	Award-Winning Film	Juries
1	(Description to be added soon)	Grand Prix : Last House Standing; Excellence Award : Journeys; Special Jury Award : Experimental Taiwanese Moon Academy; Audience Award : Mr. Cortisone, Happy Days	Trinh T. Minh-ha; Sandra Ruch; Wang XiaoLong; Dan Wolman; Do Jung Il
2	(Description to be added soon)	Grand Prix : Bunso: The Youngest; Spirit Award : Little Birds; Special Jury Award : The Concrete Revolution; Audience Award : School Among Glaciers	Leonard Retel Helmrich; Ally Derks; Trinh T. Minh-ha; Kim So Young; Cho Chong Heup
3	(Description to be added soon)	Grand Prix : Out of Bound; Spirit Award : Innocence; Special Jury Award : Smiling in a War Zone; Audience Award : Our Own Private Bin Laden	Dimitri Eipides; Sato Makoto; Claire Aguilar; Yoav Shamir; Lee Seung-Moo
4	(Description to be added soon)	Grand Prix : Puujee; Spirit Award : The Cats of Mirikitani; Special Jury Award : Shame; Audience Award : To Live - Save Our Saemankum; Honorable Mention by the Jury : Made in Korea: A One Way Ticket Seoul-Amsterdam?	Geoffrey Gilmore; Antoinette Spielmann-von Joest; Lee Ann Kim; Chang-Jae Lee; Hideo Murata
5	(Description to be added soon)	Grand Prix : If We Knew; Spirit Award : The Art Star and the Sudanese Twins; Special Jury Award : Suddenly, Last Winter; Audience Award : Hear and Now; Honorable Mention by the Jury : The Red Race / The Demons of Eden	Christine Choy; Choong Jik Lee; Antoine Coppola; Ikeya Kaoru; Jung Ok Lee
6	(Description to be added soon)	Grand Prix : Unmistaken Child; Spirit Award : Apology of an Economic Hit Man; Special Jury Award : Gaza-Sderot, Pre-War Chronicles; Audience Award : Unmistaken Child; Honorable Mention by the Jury : About Face: The Story of Gwendellin Bradshaw / Rip: A Remix Manifesto; EIDF Documentary Fund Winning Film: Bittersweet Joke	Thom Andersen; Yves Jeanneau; Kiyong Park; Kaori Sakagami; Gunny Hyoung
7	(Description to be added soon)	Grand Prix : Last Train Home; Spirit Award : Disco and Atomic War; Special Jury Award : Space Tourist; unicef Award : Planet of Snail; Audience Award : Planet of Snail; EIDF Documentary Fund Winning Film: Planet of Snail	Pepe Danquart; Monique Simard; Atef Dalgamouni; Park Bong Nam; Lee Jeong Ook
8	(Description to be added soon)	Grand Prix : Marathon Boy; Issues in Education Grand Prix : World Class Kids; Spirit Award : The Green Wave; Special Jury Award : The Castle; Audience Award : Marathon Boy; unicef Award : How Are You Doing, Rudolf Ming?; EIDF Documentary Fund Award : The Struggle for Sprouting	Festival Choice: Mark Lewis; Bill Nichols; Leonardo Retel Helmrich; Zhang Xien Min; Yu Gina; Issues in Education: Morten Moller Warmedal; Fukkiko Kisaichi; Lee Jung Ok
9	(Description to be added soon)	Grand Prix : Private Universe; Edu Choice Grand Prix : In My Mother's Arms; Spirit Award : High Tech; Special Jury Award : Going up the Stairs; unicef Award : Inocente; Audience Award : The Reluctant Revolutionary	Festival Choice: Ross McElwee; Nino Kirtadze; Iikka Vehkalahti; Jacob Wong; Yi Seung-Jun; Edu Choice: Andy Glynee; Kim Yu Yeol; Nishikawa Miwako
10	(Description to be added soon)	Grand Prix : Which Way Is the Front Line from Here? The Life and Time of Tim Hetherington; Spirit Award : The Gatekeepers; Special Jury Award : Buzkashi!; unicef Award : Beyond the Wave; Audience Award : Where is my Son?	Leonard RETEL HELMRICH; Tom PERLMUTTER; Daniel CROSS; Karolina LIDIN; Wakako NAGANO; Evgenii OLENEV; Gunny HTOUNG
11	(Description to be added soon)	Grand Prix : Return to Homs; Spirit Award : Tomorrow We Disappear; Special Jury Award : Ariel; unicef Award : Wind on the Moon; Audience Award : 112 Weddings	Victor KOSSAKOVSKY; David ROYLE; Ramona DIAZ; Sinai ABT; CHU Deok-Dam
12	(Description to be added soon)	Grand Prix : Tea Time; Spirit Award : Dance with Montaigne; Special Jury Award : Placebo; Audience Award : Almost There	Ally DERKS; GAN Chao; Jane ROSCOE; Philip CHEAH; JEONG Jae Eung
13	(Description to be added soon)	Grand Prix : Natural Disorder; Spirit Award : GULISTAN, Land of Roses; Special Jury Award : Holy Cow; Audience Award : GULISTAN, Land of Roses	TRINH T. Minh-ha; Chris FUJIWARA; OH Jung-hun; WAKAI Makiko; LEE Jung Ok
14	(Description to be added soon)	Grand Prix : Spirit Award : Special Jury Award : unicef Award : Audience Award :	Festival Choice
15			
16		Grand Prix : Honeyland; Documentary Goyang Award : Selfie; Special Jury Award : Leftover Women; unicef Award : Audience Award : Women of the Gulag; World Vision Special Award: My Little Dancing Shoes	
17	From August 17 to August 23, 2020; 69 films from 30 countries	Global part: Daesang : Cinema Pamir by Martin von Krog; Judge's Special Award : 499 by Rodrigo Reyes; Audience Award : Land of Winter Children by Xenia Elian; Asian part: Daesang : Welcom to X-World by Han Tae-eui; Judge's Special Award : The Blowing Song None of Your Business by Cam Ranh Heydari; Audience Award : Daughter of the Light by Kashem Gial	Festival Choice (Competition): Global Jury: Jane Ray; Yi Seung-Jun; Jee Hye-won; Choi Pyung-soon; Festival Choice (competition): Asian Jury: Kim Il-ran; Kim Hun-seok; Grace Lee; Mark Sigmund
18	From August 23 to August 29, 2021; 64 films from 29 countries	Festival Choice (Competition) Global: Grand Prix: The Jump by Giedrė Žickytė; Special Jury Award: The Birth of Resonance by Lee Jeong-jun; Audience Award: The Birth of Resonance by Lee Jeong-jun; Festival Choice (Competition) Asia: Grand Prix (Documentary Goyang Award): Me and the Cult Leader by Sakahara Atsushi: Special Jury Award: Floating Village Asylum by Preecha Srisuwan; Audience Award: Locking Horns by Sim Younghwa; Special Jury Mentioned: The War of Raya Sinitsina Efim Graboy	Festival Choice (Competition): Global Jury: Ha Sinae; Kim Young-woo; Kim Yun Young; Patricia R. Zimmermann; Festival Choice (competition): Asian Jury: Aboozar Amini; Lee Hong Ki; Sung Moon; Yi MeeSol
19	From August 22 to August 28, 2022; 63 films from 24 countries	TBA	Festival Choice (Competition): Global Jury: Rudy Buttignol; Kim Young me; Bin Jung Hyun; Yoo Jisu Klaire; Festival Choice (competition): Asian Jury: Chae Rada; Lee Hark-Joon; Kim Dongryung; Pailin Lorraine Wedel

== See also ==
- List of festivals in South Korea
- List of festivals in Asia
