= Geshe Lama Konchog =

Geshe Lama Konchog, born Lobsang Puntsog (1927– October 15, 2001), was a Tibetan Buddhist lama of the Gelug school, who had thousands of followers around the world. Konchog was recognized by the Dalai Lama to be a Mahasiddha, or realized guru.

Konchog spent a total of 26 years(Edit: from Ref link below "His students have known that he meditated in caves for twenty-five years") in isolated mountain retreat, seeking illumination. Beginning in 1985, he resided at Kopan Monastery in Kathmandu, Nepal. He also traveled around the world teaching.

Konchog died at the age of 74 in 2001. Tenzin Nyudrup (Phuntsok Rinpoche) was recognized by the Dalai Lama to be Konchog's reincarnation. Konchog's funeral rites, and the search for his subsequent reincarnation by his close disciple Tenzin Zopa, are documented in the 2008 film, Unmistaken Child.
