= Tenzin Phuntsok Rinpoche =

Tenzin Phuntsok Rinpoche (Standard Tibetan: བསྟན་འཛིན་ཕུན་ཚོགས་རིན་པོ་ཆེ་) (born October 28, 2002), also called Tenzin Nyudrup, is the recognised reincarnation of the Tibetan Mahasiddha Geshe Lama Konchog, who died in 2001.

His early life and discovery as a reincarnated lama is documented in the 2008 English-language documentary film, Unmistaken Child.
