= Atomic, Living in Dread and Promise =

- Directed by: Mark Cousins
- Produced by: John Archer; Mark Atkin; Heather Croall
- Music by: Mogwai
- Release date: 10 August 2015
- Running time: 70 minutes
- Country: United Kingdom
- Language: English

Atomic, Living in Dread and Promise is a documentary film about nuclear history directed by Mark Cousins and co-produced by Heather Croall, Mark Atkin, and John Archer. It uses only archive footage to explore life and death in the Atomic Age. The band Mogwai created the original soundtrack.

== Synopsis ==
Mark Cousins' montage explores the bombings of Hiroshima and Nagasaki, the Chernobyl disaster, Fukushima disaster, and the Three Mile Island accident. There are also protests: the Aldermaston marches and Greenham Common Women's Peace Camp. The Cold War also features.

== Production ==
Atomic, Living in Dread and Promise was directed by Mark Cousins and co-produced by Heather Croall, Mark Atkin, and John Archer. It uses only archive footage to explore life and death in the Atomic Age. The band Mogwai created the original soundtrack.

The subject matter was particularly relevant to Scotland following the independence referendum, which highlighted the issue of nuclear weapons at Faslane as part of the UK's Trident nuclear programme.

Footage used in the film also shows the benefits of atomic science, such as the X-ray and MRI scans.

== Soundtrack ==
The soundtrack was subsequently reworked by Mogwai into a studio album, Atomic.

== Release ==
The film, with a live performance by Mogwai, closed the Edinburgh International Festival in 2016.

It was shown on BBC Storyville in August 2015 to mark 70 years since the bombing of Hiroshima.
