= Girt by Sea =

- Directed by: Shane McNeil
- Produced by: Heather Croall; Kate Separovich
- Music by: The Panics
- Release date: 9 February 2014
- Running time: 58 mins
- Country: Australia
- Language: English

Girt by Sea is a 2014 documentary film about the Australian coast which combines archive and crowd-sourced footage with an original soundtrack by The Panics. It was directed by Shane McNeil and co-produced by Heather Croall and Kate Separovich.

== Synopsis ==
Girt by Sea explores the role the coast has played in Australia's national identity. It depicts surf lifesavers on Bondi Beach, shipbuilding in Whyalla, the Great Ocean Road, coral reefs off Queensland, the indigenous fishermen of Groote Eylandt, and Tasmania's sentinel lighthouses. It also shows darker moments such as whaling, the impact of colonisation, and changing views on immigration. Its content spans 100 years of moving images.

== Production ==
The film, written by Shane McNeil and co-produced by Heather Croall and Kate Separovich, follows the format of From the Sea to the Land Beyond, a similar history of the UK coastline based on archival material, backed by a soundtrack by British Sea Power, co-produced by Heather Croall.

The film was commissioned by ABC TV Arts, Perth International Arts Festival, ScreenWest, Screen Australia, and the National Film and Sound Archive (NFSA). It was directed by Shane McNeil. It was made using footage from the NFSA and ABC archives, along with crowd-sourced home movies contributed through social media.

The title comes from a line in the Australian national anthem, Advance Australia Fair, "Our home is girt by sea" ("girt" meaning surrounded).

== Release ==
The sold-out world premiere was at Perth International Arts Festival on 9 February 2014, with live accompaniment by The Panics. It was broadcast on ABC 1 the following week, on 16 February 2014.

In August 2016 the film was again screened to live accompaniment by the Panics, at the Adelaide Guitar Festival at Her Majesty's Theatre.
