= The Show of Shows: 100 Years of Vaudeville, Circuses and Carnivals =

- Directed by: Benedikt Erlingsson
- Produced by: Margret Jonasdottir; Heather Croall; Mark Atkin; Vanessa Toulmin
- Music by: Sigur Rós; Hilmar Örn Hilmarsson; Kjartan Dagur Holm
- Release date: 4 December 2015
- Running time: 76 minutes
- Countries: Iceland; United Kingdom

The Show of Shows is a montage documentary film about vaudeville, circuses, and carnivals which was assembled from footage from the National Fairground Archive. It has an original soundtrack by members of Sigur Rós and the composer Hilmar Örn Hilmarsson, and was commissioned by BBC Storyville and BBC North.

== The film ==
The archive which provided the footage is held at the University of Sheffield. For the film, it provided home movies from circus families, moving images of clowns, acrobats, the high wire, human cannonballs and escapologists. Cabaret acts, fairground attractions, variety performances, music hall and seaside entertainments are all part of the fabric of the film. Scenes of animals and children performing for entertainment show how times and attitudes have changed.

The film premiered by opening Sheffield Doc/Fest, and was screened at San Sebastián International Film Festival and Sarajevo Film Festival. It was shown on BBC Four on 17 January 2016 as The Golden Age of Circus: The Show of Shows.

== The soundtrack ==
The soundtrack was released as Circe – Music Composed For The Show Of Shows on 28 August 2015 by the Krunk label.
