= The Square (2013 film) =

2013 Egyptian film by Jehane Noujaim

The Square (El-Midan)
- Directed by: Jehane Noujaim
- Produced by: Karim Amer
- Starring: Khalid Abdalla; Ahmed Hassan; Dina Abdullah; Magdy Ashour; Sherif Boray; Aida El-Kashef
- Cinematography: Jehane Noujaim; Muhammad Hamdy; Ahmed Hassan; Cressida Trew
- Edited by: Christopher de la Torre; Mohammed el Manasterly; Karim Fanous; Pierre Haberer; Pedro Kos; Stefan Ronowicz; Shazeya Serag; Angie Wegdan Yasmin Kamal
- Music by: Jonas Colstrup; Score: H. Scott Salinas
- Production companies: Noujaim Films; Worldview Entertainment
- Distributed by: GathrFilms; Participant Media
- Release dates: January 18, 2013 (Sundance); September 6, 2013 (TIFF); October 25, 2013 (United States)
- Running time: 108 minutes
- Countries: Egypt; United States
- Languages: Egyptian Arabic; English
- Budget: $1.5 million
- Box office: $124,244

The Square (Arabic: الميدان, romanized: Al-Maydan) is a 2013 Egyptian-American documentary film by Jehane Noujaim, which depicts the Egyptian Crisis until 2013, starting with the Egyptian Revolution of 2011 at Tahrir Square. The film was nominated for the Academy Award for Best Documentary Feature at the 86th Academy Awards. It also won three Emmy Awards at the 66th Primetime Creative Arts Emmy Awards, out of four for which it was nominated.

== Release ==
The Square premiered on January 17, 2013, at the 2013 Sundance Film Festival, where it won the Audience Award for World Cinema in the documentary category. It was pitched as part of the 2012 MeetMarket at that year's Sheffield Doc/Fest. Due to the ongoing nature of the Egyptian Revolution, Noujaim updated the ending of the film over the summer of 2013. The film was subsequently also named winner of the Kalba People's Choice Award in the documentary category at the 2013 Toronto International Film Festival. The production is done in the native languages of its cast and is presented with English subtitles.

The film was released on Netflix and in exclusive locations across the United States on January 17, 2014. The final version was modified to take political developments into the final version, as released on Netflix.

== Critical reception ==
The Square received universal acclaim, currently holding a 100% "fresh" rating on review aggregator website Rotten Tomatoes based on 70 reviews, with a weighted average of 8.40/10. On Metacritic, the film has an 84/100 rating based on 21 critics, indicating "universal acclaim".

A.O. Scott of The New York Times wrote, "The Square, while it records the gruesome collision of utopian aspirations with cold political realities, is not a despairing film. It concludes on a note of resolve grounded in the acknowledgment that historical change can be a long, slow process."

The Chicago Tribune described it as "[a] compelling inside look at the cascading series of revolutions and counterrevolutions that have shaken Egypt since the beginning of 2011." The Washington Post described it as "elegantly shot and structured, but infused with rough, spontaneous energy; global in its consciousness but intimate in its approach; carefully pitched but emotionally wrenching; deeply troubling but ultimately exhilarating." Writing for Bright Lights Film Journal, Gregory Stephens suggests the film soberly "confirms that only rarely do revolutions 'jump their tracks' so that a new script can be written. ... This disaffection, both spontaneous and stylized, makes good copy, and good theatre. On whether or not it can lead to a new script of how government 'of the people' serves the often conflicting interests of its citizens, the jury is still out."

=== Accolades ===
The Square received the Audience Award for World Cinema Documentary at the 2013 Sundance film festival and the best feature award from the International Documentary Association. It was nominated for Best Documentary Feature at the 2014 Academy Awards. It also won three Emmys, for Outstanding Cinematography for Nonfiction Programming, Outstanding Directing for Nonfiction Programming and Outstanding Picture Editing for Nonfiction Programming, along with the Tim Hetherington Award at Sheffield Doc/Fest in 2013.

== Cast ==
- Khalid Abdalla
- Dina Abdullah
- Magdy Ashour
- Sherif Boray
- Aida Elkashef
- Ramy Essam
- Ahmed Hassan
- Bothaina Kamel
- Khaled Nagy
- Ragia Omran
- Salma Saied
- Ahmed Saleh
- Pierre Seyoufr
- Ramy Shaath
- Timo de Jong
- Niels Verouden
- Jesse Dijksma
- Valesto
- Willie J
- TeamO
- Murk
- Zaid
- Abdala
- Brian Los
- Hesse
- Kjoenster
- Sneert
- Jaliun
- Shane

== See also ==
- Egyptian cinema
- Tahrir 2011: The Good, the Bad, and the Politician, a 2012 Egyptian documentary film
- List of films with a 100% rating on Rotten Tomatoes, a film review aggregator website
