= Storyville (TV series) =

Documentary series presented by the BBC

- Genre: Documentary

Original release
- Network: BBC

Storyville is a documentary series presented by the BBC featuring international documentaries. It first aired on 15 November 1997. It has been part of BBC Film since 2020.

== List of documentaries ==
=== 2026 series ===
Episode #	Date first Broadcast	Title	Description	Source
1	17 Feb 2026	The Darkest Web	Follows a global team of undercover officers as they penetrate the most hidden corners of the internet to stop those who exploit and harm children.	
2	24 Feb 2026	Rebuilding Bucha	Set in Bucha, Ukraine, this documentary follows five protagonists as they attempt to rebuild their lives and come to terms with the legacy of war.	
3	3 Mar 2026	Red Light to Limelight	Follows a group of women working in a red-light district of Kolkata who are reclaiming their voices through the power of video storytelling.	
4	3 Mar 2026	Mistress Dispeller	Explores an increasingly popular phenomenon in contemporary China. A woman hires a 'mistress dispeller' to bring her husband’s affair to an end.	
5	17 Mar 2026	Portrait of a Confused Father	Filmed over more than 20 years, this documentary charts an extraordinary father–son relationship that takes an unexpected and tragic turn.	
6	25 Mar 2026	Khartoum	Set against the backdrop of conflict in Sudan, this documentary follows five Khartoum residents as they search for freedom amid revolution and war.	
7	1 Apr 2026	Three Dads And A Baby	This intimate and pioneering film explores a three-way relationship and a radically different approach to fatherhood.	
8	7 Apr 2026	André Is an Idiot	This documentary follows André, who, despite receiving a terminal diagnosis, is determined to die with humour, curiosity and defiance.	
9	14 Apr 2026	Speechless Part 1: The New Campus Revolution	This documentary delves into the heart of the culture wars and freedom of speech conversations that have exploded on US campuses over the last ten years.	
10	21 Apr 2026	Speechless Part 2: The Pendulum Swings	This documentary delves into the heart of the culture wars and freedom of speech conversations that have exploded on US campuses over the last ten years.	
11	13 Oct 2026	Ask E. Jean	This documentary tells the story of journalist and advice columnist E. Jean Carroll, exploring her professional achievements as well as her legal battles against Donald Trump.	
12	23 Oct 2026	A Want in Her	Debut feature documentary from filmmaker Myrid Carten, which unfolds as a powerful exploration of family, addiction and unconditional love.	
13	27 Oct 2026	Black Is Beautiful: The Kwame Brathwaite Story	The remarkable story of the Harlem photographer, activist and cultural pioneer Kwame Brathwaite, whose work helped define the Black Is Beautiful movement.	
14	3 Nov 2026	Allies in Exile	This documentary follows Syrian film-makers and friends Hasan Kattan and Fadi Al-Halabi through the brutal war in Syria to the uncertainty of the UK asylum system.	
15	3 Nov 2026	An Unknown Substance	During the imprisonment of Vladimir Kara-Murza, his wife Evgenia Kara-Murza mounts a global campaign to bring him home and ensure that his voice will not be silenced.	
16	10 Nov 2026	Manhood	Dallas businessman Bill Moore sets out to make penis enlargement as commonplace as Botox. The film follows several men undergo procedures in pursuit of physical transformation.	
16	17 Nov 2026	The Last Spy	This documentary shines a light on the extraordinary life of CIA officer Peter Sichel, who fled Nazi Germany and became one of the most influential figures in US intelligence.	

=== 2025 series ===
Episode #	Date first Broadcast	Title	Description	Source
1	7 Jan 2025	Black Box Diaries	Oscar-nominated documentary about journalist and filmmaker Shiori Itō's fight for justice after being raped by a senior colleague in Japan.	
2	11 Feb 2025	26.2 to Life: Inside the San Quentin Prison Marathon	Documentary following three men sentenced to life at San Quentin Rehabilitation Center training for a marathon around the prison yard.	
3	18 Feb 2025	Gaucho Gaucho: Argentina's Last Ranchers	2024 documentary film about the lives of gauchos in Argentina.	
4	25 Feb 2025	The Battle for Laikipia	Filmed during severe drought, explores the relationship and tension between the nomadic Samburu people and the descendants of European settlers in Laikipia County.	
5	4 Mar 2025	The Covid Queue at Pavilion 6	Croatian doumentary film showing a snapshot of life in a COVID-19 vaccination centre.	
6	11 Mar 2025	Eternal Spring: The Heist of China's Airwaves	Canadian animated documentary about Falun Gong's 2002 hijacking of broadcast television.	
7	27 May 2025	White Man Walking	Documentary following white film-maker Rob Bliss as he travels across the southern United States wearing a Black Lives Matter t-shirt.	
4	3 Jun 2025	The Jackal Speaks	Documentary exploring the life of Ilich Ramirez Sanchez, also known as Carlos the Jackal.	
5	10 Jun 2025	Wedding Night	Ultra orthodox Jewish couples, married in arranged marriages in a community where boys and girls are raised almost completely separately, speak about their wedding night.	
6	17 Jun 2025	The Contestant	2023 documentary about Nasubi, an aspiring comedian in Japan who lived alone in a room for 15 months for a reality show.	
7	24 Jun 2025	The Wolves Always Come at Night	Docudrama telling the story of a Mongolian couple who must leave their lives as shepherds in the Gobi Desert and move to Ulaanbaatar.	
8	1 Jul 2025	The Srebrenica Tape	Follows a young woman returning to her birthtown of Srebrenica to learn more about her father who died in the Srebrenica massacre.	
9	30 Sep 2025	Holding Liat	Documentary following the kidnapping of Liat Beinin Atzili and her husband during the October 7 attacks.	
10	7 Oct 2025	The Librarians	Documentary exploring how librarians around America are responding to campaign groups seeking to ban books.	
11	14 Oct 2025	Mr Nobody Against Putin	A Russian school teacher covertly films in classrooms and meetings as the government introduces patriotic lessons and military drills.	
12	21 Oct 2025	Sanatorium	Documentary showing the summer season in the Kuyalnik Sanatorium outside Odesa as staff and patrons navigate life as the Russo-Ukrainian war rages outside.	
13	28 Oct 2025	Welded Together	An independent young welder unexpectedly becomes the carer for her vulnerable half-sister.	

=== 2021 series ===
Date first Broadcast	Title	Description	Source
02 Oct 2021	United Skates	When America's last standing roller rinks are threatened with closure, a community of thousands battles in a racially charged environment to save an underground subculture - one that has remained undiscovered by the mainstream for generations, yet has given rise to some of the world's greatest musical talent.	

=== 2018 series ===
Episode #	Date first Broadcast	Title	Description	Source
1	28 Jan 2018	Trophy: The Big Game Hunting Controversy	Documentary film about trophy hunting and wildlife conservation.	
2	11 Jun 2018	City of Ghosts	Bafta-nominated documentary about citizen journalists in Raqqa under IS control and their life as refugees after fleeing.	
3	17 Jun 2018	Eagle Huntress (2016)	A Kazakh documentary about 13-year-old girl's attempt to be the first female to compete in an eagle hunting festival.	
4	27 June 2018	This is Congo		
5	1 July 2018	Olympic Dreams of Russian Gold – Over the Limit		
6	9 July 2018	John Curry: The Ice King		
7	22 July 2018	Insha'Allah Democracy		
8	8 October 2018	Jailed in America		
9	22 October 2018	A Woman Captured		
10	29 October 2018	Selling Children		
11	11 November 2018	Quest: Surviving in America		
12	19 November 2018	Poisoning America: The Devil We Know	A group of citizens in West Virginia take on a powerful corporation.	
13	26 November 2018	Hurt Locker Hero	The story of a Kurdish colonel in the Iraqi army who disarmed thousands of landmines.	
14	9 Dec 2018	The Farthest: Voyager's Interstellar Journey	The story of Voyager, an epic of human achievement, personal drama and miraculous success.	
15	17 Dec 2018	Richard Pryor: Omit the Logic	A documentary about Richard Pryor, chronicling his life from his troubled youth to his meteoric rise as one of the most respected comedians of the 20th century.	

=== 2016–2017 series ===
Episode #	Date first Broadcast	Title	Description	Source
1	21 August 2017	Silk Road: Drugs, Death and the Dark Web	Documentary about the dark web illegal drug marketplace Silk Road.	
2		Chasing Asylum – Inside Australia's Detention Camps	Directed and produced by Eva Orner, about Australia's treatment of asylum seekers and refugees.	
3		Weiner – Sexts, Scandals and Politics	Political documentary film by Josh Kriegman and Elyse Steinberg about Anthony Weiner's campaign for Mayor of New York City during the 2013 mayoral election.	
4		Jim: The James Foley Story	American documentary film about the life of war correspondent James "Jim" Foley, directed by Brian Oakes.	
5		Brides for Sale – Sonita	Documentary film directed by Rokhsareh Ghaemmaghami about Sonita Alizadeh, a 15-year-old Afghan rapper and refugee living in Tehran.	
6		The Cult that Stole Children – Inside The Family	Film about The Family, an Australian New Age group formed in the mid-1960s under the leadership of Anne Hamilton-Byrne, which perpetrated child abuse and illegal adoption practices.	
7		Forever Pure – Football and Racism in Jerusalem		

=== 2015–2016 series ===
Episodes from the 2015–2016 series

Episode #	Date first broadcast	Title	Description	Source
1	28 April 2015	Himmler: The Decent One	The story of Heinrich Himmler through the private letters, photographs and diaries discovered at his home in 1945.	
2	13 July 2015	Last Days in Vietnam	The story of the final days of the Vietnam War as Saigon is about to fall to the North Vietnamese Army.	
3	22 July 2015	Circus Elephant Rampage	The story of Tyke a circus elephant who went on the rampage in Honolulu. She killed her trainer in front of spectators and she was shot dead.	
4	9 August 2015	Atomic, Living in Dread and Promise	A look at life and death in the atomic age from Hiroshima to X-rays and MRI scans.	
5	28 September 2015	A Syrian Love Story	Award-winning documentary telling the story of a family torn apart by the Assad regime.	
6	2 November 2015	Lockerbie: My Brother's Bomber	Ken Dornstein sets out to find the men responsible for the bombing of Pan Am Flight 103.	
7	9 November 2015	Dreamcatcher: Surviving Chicago's Streets	How a former prostitute helps vulnerable women escape danger on the streets of Chicago.	
8	16 November 2015	Orion: The Man Who Would Be King	The obscure singer who masqueraded as Elvis Presley back from the grave.	
9	23 November 2015	Cartel Land	An exposé of the Mexican drug war and the cartels operating around the Mexico/US border.	
10	30 November 2015	FBI Undercover	Following an FBI counterterrorism operation with the help from a former 'Black Panther' turned FBI informer Saeed Torres.	
11	7 December 2015	The Six-Day War: Censored Voices	Interviews of Israeli soldiers returning after the Six-Day War of 1967.	
12	17 January 2016	The Golden Age of Circus: The Show of Shows	The story of circus performers, cabaret acts and vaudeville and fairground attractions.	
13	24 January 2016	The Great Gangster Film Fraud	Documentary about a plan to scam the British taxman by faking the production of a movie.	
14	31 January 2016	A Death Row Tale: The Fear of 13	The story of Nick Yarris, a convicted murderer on death row who was exonerated after petitioning the court asking to be executed.	
15	14 February 2016	Decadence and Downfall: The Shah of Iran's Ultimate Party	The documentary of the Celebration of the 2,500 years of the Persian monarchy.	
17	21 February 2016	The Black Panthers	The documentary of the Black Panthers.	
18	28 February 2016	Bolshoi Babylon	The documentary of the Bolshoi Ballet.	
19	23 June 2016	Unlocking the Cage	The documentary of the animal rights lawyer Steven Wise.	
20	7 November 2016	Being Evel Knievel	The documentary of the success of Evel Knievel.	

=== 2014–2015 series ===
Episodes from the 2014–2015 series:

Episode #	Date first broadcast	Title	Description	Source
23	30 March 2015	My Mother the Secret Baby	Daisy Asquith tells the story of her mother's conception after a dance in 1940s Ireland.	
22	23 March 2015	Masterspy of Moscow – George Blake	Film about the spy George Blake, who escaped from jail and fled to the Soviet Union.	
21	17 March 2015	The Lost Gold of the Highlands	A man searches a mysterious Scottish loch for a lost fortune he believes is hidden there.	
20	9 March 2015	Rocking Cambodia: Rise of a Pop Diva	Documentary telling the story of the rise of the band Cambodian Space Project.	
19	4 March 2015	India's Daughter	The story of the brutal gang rape and murder of 23-year-old medical student Jyoti on a moving bus in Delhi in 2012, and the unprecedented protests and riots which this horrific event ignited throughout India.	
18	2 March 2015	1.7 Billion Dollar Fraud: Full Exposure	In October 2011, Olympus Corporation, a multibillion-dollar Japanese optical company, dismissed its president and CEO, British-born Michael Woodford, over cultural differences in management style.	
17	1 March 2015	The Great European Disaster Movie	Authored documentary by Italian director Annalisa Piras and former editor of The Economist Bill Emmott, which explores the crisis facing Europe.	
16	18 Feb 2015	The Great Sex Addict Heist: The Dog	Documentary about John Wojtowicz who is the inspiration for the 1975 movie Dog Day Afternoon.	
15	16 Feb 2015	Love Hotel	Documentary about a love hotel in Osaka, day-to-day life of its staff and its patrons.	
14	22 Feb 2015	Love Is All: 100 Years of Love and Courtship	A magical and moving archive trip through the universal theme of love, set to a stunning soundtrack by Richard Hawley.	
13	10 Feb 2015	Bulldozers, Paving Stones and Power: The Chinese Mayor	Documentary which looks into how power works in the Chinese Communist Party, focused through the mission of one local mayor.	
12	9 Feb 2015	Mugabe and the Democrats	Political documentary thriller set in Zimbabwe, following two political enemies forced on a joint mission.	
11	2 Feb 2015	The Internet's Own Boy	Documentary which explores the life of Aaron Swartz, an activist for social justice and political organising on the internet, and the circumstances that led to his early death.	
10	26 Jan 2015	The Arabian Motorcycle Adventures	Documentary about an American man, Matt Van Dyke's, multi-year, 35,000-mile motorcycle trip through northern Africa and the Middle East, which saw him fight in the Libyan conflict against Gaddafi.	
9	21 Dec 2014	Panto! Mayhem, Make Up and Magic	Film following a cast of Nottingham amateur actors who are staging a production of Puss in Boots, reflecting the vital and life-changing role the theatre plays in people's lives.	
8	2 Nov 2014	Exposed: Magicians, Psychics and Frauds	How magician James Randi has debunked faith healers, fortune tellers and psychics.	
7	26 Oct 2014	112 Weddings	A filmmaker finds out what happened to some of the couples whose wedding videos he shot.	
6	15 Oct 2014	Particle Fever: The Hunt for the Higgs Boson	Documentary which follows six scientists during the launch of the Large Hadron Collider.	
5	29 Sep 2014	Arms Dealer: The Notorious Mr Bout	Documentary following Viktor Bout – entrepreneur, arms smuggler and amateur film-maker.	
4	15 Sep 2014	Web Junkies – China's Addicted Teens	Film following Chinese teenagers in a Beijing rehabilitation centre for internet addicts.	
3	6 Jul 2014	Velorama	Documentary using BFI archive footage to look back at a century of cycling.	
2	6 Jun 2014	The Lance Armstrong Story – Stop at Nothing	Film telling the story of the man behind the greatest fraud in recent sporting history.	
1	30 May 2014	Searching for Sugar Man	How the forgotten 1960s American rocker Rodriguez became a phenomenon in South Africa.	

=== 2013–2014 series ===
- 24. Shooting Bigfoot: America's Monster Hunters
- 8. Smash & Grab – The Story of the Pink Panthers
- 7. Pussy Riot – A Punk Prayer

=== 2012–2013 series ===
- 18. The Pirate Bay
- 14. Queen of Versailles
- The Road: A Story of Life & Death by Marc Isaacs

=== Other series ===
Episodes from previous series:

Episode #	Date first broadcast	Title	Description	Source
.	19 Oct 2014	Russia's Toughest Prison: The Condemned		
.	11 Oct 2014	The Gatekeepers		
.	22 Sep 2014	The Himalayan Boy and the TV Set		
.	22 Jun 2014	The Legend of Billie Jean King – Battle of the Sexes	The story of the 1973 tennis match between Billie Jean King and Bobby Riggs.	
.	31 Mar 2014	Which Way is the Front Line from Here? The Life and Time of Tim Hetherington	Film about Tim Hetherington, the war photographer killed during the Libyan civil war.	
24	24 Mar 2014	Shooting Bigfoot: America's Monster Hunters	Documentary about the obsessive, competitive and divided cult of Bigfoot hunting.	
.	19 Mar 2014	Brakeless: Why Trains Crash	Documentary exploring one of Japan's biggest train crashes in modern history.	
.	7 Mar 2014	"Muscle Shoals: The Greatest Recording Studio in the World"	Film about the town with two recording studios where some of America's most creative and defiant music was made.	
.	3 Mar 2014	The Village that Fought Back: Five Broken Cameras	The video diary of a Palestinian farmer who films unrest in his West Bank village.	
.	27 Feb 2014	Soccer Coach Zoran and his African Tigers	A Serbian coach attempts to forge South Sudan's first national football team.	
.	17 Feb 2014	Cutie and the Boxer	Documentary about the chaotic 40-year marriage of two Japanese artists in New York.	
.	5 Feb 2014	K2: The Killer Summit	Documentary looking at how 11 climbers were killed during a descent of K2 in August 2008.	
.	3 Feb 2014	Mad Dog: Gaddafi's Secret World	Insiders who gave shape to Gaddafi's dark dreams talk about his terrifying regime.	
.	26 Jan 2014	The Big Melt – How Steel Made Us Hard	Archive footage and a live score tell the story of steel and the story of Sheffield.	
.	20 Jan 2014	Big Brother Watching Me: Citizen Ai Weiwei	Learning about Chinese artists Ai Weiwei, whose works have brought him notoriety and a prison sentence.	
.	13 Jan 2014	Mandela, The Myth and Me	Examining questions regarding the legacy of Nelson Mandela.	
.	4 Dec 2013	Fame in China	How the senior class at China's top drama academy staged the musical, Fame.	
.	21 Nov 2013	Blackfish – The Whale that Killed		
.	18 Nov 2013	The Spy who Went into the Cold: Kim Philby, Soviet Super Spy		
.	4 Nov 2013	The Disappeared		
.	4 Nov 2013	Hotel Folly – Folie à Deux	Filmed over five years, this is an emotional rollercoaster of a documentary which explores the sometimes extreme highs and lows of one of life's biggest gambles – buying a home. Part black comedy, part nail-biting journey, this shows the human cost of the mortgage crisis.	
.	23 Oct 2013	The Great Hip Hop Hoax	Californian hip-hop duo Silibil N' Brains were going to be massive. No one knew the pair were really Scottish, with fake American accents and made up identities.	
8	22 Oct 2013	Smash & Grab: The Story of the Pink Panthers	Documentary about a gang of diamond thieves called the Pink Panthers.	
7	21 Oct 2013	Pussy Riot: A Punk Prayer	How a group of young, feminist punk rockers known as Pussy Riot captured the world's attention by protesting against Putin's Russia.	
.	25 Feb 2013	I Will Be Murdered	A murdered Guatemalan lawyer foretells his death and names the culprits.	
.	20 Feb 2013	How Hackers Changed the World: We Are Legion	Documentary about the radical online 'hacktivist' collective Anonymous.	
.	19 Feb 2013	The Pirate Bay	How the founders of a file sharing site were taken to court by the entertainment industry.	
.	18 Feb 2013	Google and the World Brain	Documentary about a campaign by authors to stop the Google Books website.	
.	11 Feb 2013	Expedition to the End of the World	A group of scientists and artists venture by ship into uncharted territory.	
.	4 Feb 2013	Death on the Staircase: The Last Chance	Documentary which follows the hearing of a murder case which split a family.	
.	28 Jan 2013	The Queen of Versailles	The story of a couple whose plans of building a mansion are hit by the economic crisis.	
.	21 Jan 2013	Harry Belafonte: Sing Your Song	Documentary surveying the life and times of singer/actor/activist Harry Belafonte.	
.	14 Jan 2013	The House I Live In	Film looking at America's War on Drugs, painting a portrait of individuals at all levels.	
.	16 Dec 2012	The Other Irish Travellers	Documentary looking at the history of Ireland's vanished Anglo-Irish classes.	
.	18 Nov 2012	From the Sea to the Land Beyond: Britain's Coast on Film	A meditation on Britain's unique coastline and the role it plays in our lives.	
.	12 Nov 2012	The Chef Who Conquered New York: Serving Up Paul Liebrandt	A look at the driven and talented British celebrity chef, Paul Liebrandt.	
.	4 Nov 2012	JFK's Road to White House: Primary 1960	Film following John F Kennedy during his 1960 Wisconsin presidential primary run.	
.	12 Sep 2012	Olympic Massacre: One Day in September	Recounting the tragic events of the 1972 'Munich Massacre'.	
.	5 Sep 2012	The $750 Million Thief	Film about Marc Stuart Dreier, a Manhattan attorney who orchestrated a fraud that netted over $750 million.	
.	13 Aug 2012	Racing Dreams	Film about three children competing in the World Karting Association's national series.	
.	23 Jul 2012	The Queen of Africa: The Miriam Makeba Story	Film about the life of South African singer and civil rights activist Miriam Makeba.	
.	5 Jul 2012	Hitler, Stalin and Mr Jones	Was a Welsh journalist killed in 1935 for revealing Stalin's policies in the Ukraine?	
.	2 Jul 2012	Albino Witchcraft Murders	Two people with albinism try to follow their dreams in the face of prejudice in Tanzania.	
.	25 Jun 2012	Girl Model	Documentary exposing the supply of ever younger girls to the Japanese modelling industry.	
.	4 Jun 2012	Surviving Progress	Documentary about the grave risks we pose to our own survival in the name of progress.	
.	19 Apr 2012	The Real Great Escape	The story of the mastermind behind World War II's Great Escape, Roger Bushel.	
.	6 Mar 2012	Murderball	Documentary exploring the sport of wheelchair rugby, unofficially known as murderball.	
.	8 Feb 2012	Guerilla – The Taking of Patty Hearst	The story of the 1974 kidnap of teenage newspaper heiress Patty Hearst.	
.	23 Nov 2010	Mandelson: The Real PM?	Follows Peter Mandelson in the run up to the 2010 United Kingdom general election.	
.	21 Jun 2010	When China Met Africa	A historic gathering of over fifty African heads of state in Beijing reverberates in Zambia where the lives of three characters unfold.	
.	9 May 2010	Cod Wars	Film about the disputes between Iceland and the UK over ownership of fishing zones.	
.	9 Mar 2010	Barbados at the Races: Bajan Born and Bred	An exploration of what it is to be Bajan (Barbadian).	
.	9 Mar 2010	Barbados at the Races: The Jockey's Prayer	A look at the lives of three Bajan jockeys.	
.	9 Mar 2010	Barbados at the Races: Run Cat Run!	How a new breed of small trainer is determined to break into the exclusive Turf Club.	
.	9 Mar 2010	Barbados at the Races: The Favourite	The build-up to the Derby seen through the eyes of those responsible for the favourite.	
.	22 Feb 2010	Dear Zachary: A Letter to a Son About His Father	Documentary film by Kurt Kuenne which chronicles the murder of Andrew Bagby and the efforts of his parents to gain custody of his child from his alleged killer.	
.	23 Nov 2009	Hi Society – The Wonderful World of Nicky Haslam	Documentary about the British socialite and wit Nicky Haslam.	
.	17 Apr 2009	The Jazz Baroness	Documentary about the British baroness who fell in love with jazz genius Thelonious Monk.	
.	7 Mar 2009	Robert Capa – In Love and War	A look at the life, loves and career of iconic war photographer Robert Capa.	
.	14 Feb 2009	Prostitution Behind the Veil	Documentary following the lives of two Iranian women who have resorted to prostitution.	
.	21 Jun 2009	Fashion Victim	How fashion designer Gianni Versace was murdered on the steps of his Miami mansion.	
.	7 Jan 2009	Blast!	Scientists launch a revolutionary telescope to try and explain the formation of galaxies.	
.	17 Nov 2008	I'm Not Dead Yet	Documentary about the inheritance of a Gothic home and a family's unspoken past.	
.	10 Nov 2008	Prodigal Sons	Transsexual filmmaker Kim and her brother Marc meet up at their high school reunion.	
.	27 Oct 2008	When Borat Came to Town	Romanian villagers attempt to clear their name after being portrayed in the film Borat.	
.	20 Oct 2008	Shot in Bombay	Documentary on Bollywood superstar Sanjay Dutt, after conviction for firearms offences.	
.	13 Oct 2008	Roman Polanski: Wanted and Desired	Re-examining Polanski's conviction for having unlawful sexual intercourse with a minor.	
.	6 Oct 2008	Dirty Tricks: The Man Who Got the Bushes Elected	Profile of Lee Atwater, who became chairman of the GOP and mentor to George W Bush.	
.	23 Sep 2008	Martin Luther King: Citizen King 1967-1968	Documentary about the final five years of civil rights activist Martin Luther King Jr.'s life.	
.	23 Sep 2008	1968	Documentary exploring what happened throughout the world in the seminal year of 1968.	
.	20 Sep 2008	The Day after Peace	Documentary charting filmmaker Jeremy Gilley's attempts to establish a Day of Peace.	
.	20 Aug 2008	Flying – Confessions of a Free Woman: Episode 2	A filmmaker reassesses her life by talking to women around the world about theirs.	
.	13 Aug 2008	Flying – Confessions of a Free Woman: Episode 1	A filmmaker reassesses her life by talking to women around the world about theirs.	
.	6 Aug 2008	The Burning Season	One young Australian entrepreneur's attempt to save the rainforests, and make a fortune.	
.	23 Jul 2008	The Chuck Show	Documentary exploring the contradictions and passions of painter Chuck Connelly.	
.	4 Jul 2008	Wheel of Time	Documentary by Werner Herzog exploring the Buddhist Kalachakra movement for world peace.	
.	16 Jun 2008	The Father, the Son and the Housekeeper	Documentary about Father Michael Cleary, an Irish priest who had his own TV chat show.	
.	28 May 2008	Death of a WAG	Documentary about the murder of an Iranian football star's wife by his mistress.	
.	7 Jul 2008	The Biggest Chinese Restaurant in the World: Compilation	Owner Qin Linzi and her staff show how to run a successful restaurant business in China.	
.	17 Jun 2008	The Biggest Chinese Restaurant in the World: Bright Future	There's a banquet for a new baby and an anniversary show to celebrate its third year.	
.	10 Jun 2008	The Biggest Chinese Restaurant in the World: Family Duties	Exploring the strong sense of duty implicit in family relationships in China.	
.	3 Jun 2008	The Biggest Chinese Restaurant in the World: A Good Match	Examining attitudes towards marriage in contemporary China.	
.	27 May 2008	The Biggest Chinese Restaurant in the World: Enterprise	What it takes to run a successful restaurant business in China.	
.	21 May 2008	Bob Dylan's Indian Birthday	The village of Shillong, North India, comes together each year to celebrate Bob Dylan.	
.	15 May 2008	Flipping Out – Israel's Drug Generation	Why so many young Israelis have fallen victim to drug culture while backpacking in India.	
.	14 May 2008	My Israel	How an Israeli woman who survived a terrorist attack has come to deal with the situation.	
.	14 May 2008	The Battle for Jerusalem	Liran Atzmor's film documents a battle that took place in Jerusalem's Old City in 1948.	
.	7 May 2008	My Secret Agent Auntie	How apparent heroine Baroness Moura Budberg may have actually been a callous Soviet agent.	
.	11 Mar 2008	Somebody Has to Live: The Journey of Ariel Dorfman	Documentary about author Ariel Dorfman, who survived the bloody 1973 coup in Chile.	
.	9 Mar 2008	Standing in the Shadows of Motown	Documentary that tells the story of The Funk Brothers, the successful Motown musicians.	
.	4 Mar 2008	Dolce Vita Africana	Documentary about celebrated Malian photographer Malick Sidibé.	
.	26 Feb 2008	Tito's Ghost	Documentary revealing how the worship of Marshal Tito continues in the former Yugoslavia.	
.	24 Feb 2008	"Dance with a Serial Killer"	French homicide cop Jean Francois Abgrall recounts bringing serial killer, Francis Heaulme to justice.	
.	19 Feb 2008	Very Russian Geniuses	How the political changes of the 1980s affected the intellectual elite in Russia.	
.	12 Feb 2008	Orthodox Stance	Film about Dmitriy Salita – Russian immigrant, professional boxer and religious Jew.	
.	5 Feb 2008	The Polish Ambulance Murders	How a cabal of undertakers bribed paramedics and doctors into murdering their patients.	
.	30 Jan 2008	Hitler's Secretary	Hitler's private secretary from Autumn 1942 talks about her role in the Third Reich.	
.	29 Jan 2008	The Devil Came on Horseback	A look at how the Arab Sudanese government seems intent on destroying its black citizens.	
.	27 Jan 2008	Jonestown: The World's Biggest Mass Suicide	In 1978, 900 members of the Jonestown cult died in possibly history's biggest mass suicide.	
.	22 Jan 2008	Cannibals in the Andes: Stranded!	The survivors of a famous plane crash relive their experiences 30 years later.	
.	15 Jan 2008	The Prisoner, or How I Planned to Kill Tony Blair	The story of a cameraman imprisoned in Baghdad, accused of plotting to kill Tony Blair.	
.	18 Dec 2007	Mr Vig and the Nun	Documentary about an 82-year-old man who has never known love, and a young Russian nun.	
.	10 Dec 2007	My Life as a Spy	Leslie Woodhead recalls his time as a Russian-speaking sleuth during the Cold War.	
.	27 Nov 2007	444 Days	The story of the 1979 hostage crisis at the American Embassy in Tehran.	
.	22 Nov 2007	Hammer and Tickle	Documentary telling the real history of Communism through jokes told by ordinary people.	
.	21 Nov 2007	The Russian Newspaper Murders	Documentary about the murders of six Russian journalists between 1995 and 2003.	
.	20 Nov 2007	Startup.com	Documentary following two high-school friends as they begin an internet startup.	
.	14 Nov 2007	Little Dieter Needs to Fly	Werner Herzog's film recreates the ordeal of US pilot Dieter Dengler, shot down over Laos.	
.	13 Nov 2007	The Madrid Connection	Documentary about the men lead the terrorist cell behind the 2004 Madrid train bombings.	
.	6 Nov 2007	Wednesday	A revealing portrait of a generation growing up in a changing Russia.	
.	6 Nov 2007	Power Trip	Documentary telling the story of the chaotic post-Soviet transition in Tbilisi, Georgia.	
.	31 Oct 2007	Gods of Brazil	Documentary telling the story of legendary Brazilian footballers Pelé and Garrincha.	
.	30 Oct 2007	Barca – The Inside Story	Documentary following the fortunes of Barcelona Football Club over a year of crisis.	
.	23 Oct 2007	Gimme Shelter	Documentary recalling the events surrounding a free concert by the Rolling Stones in 1969.	
.	23 Oct 2007	New York Doll	Documentary which details the turbulent history of the New York Dolls.	
.	16 Oct 2007	Etre et avoir	Documentary portrait of life in a tiny one-class primary school in France's Auvergne.	
.	11 Oct 2007	The Ministry of Truth	Documentary about Richard Symons' campaign for truth in the Houses of Parliament.	
.	11 Oct 2007	Oona and Me	Documentary about ex-Labour MP Oona King.	
.	8 Oct 2007	Sitting for Parliament	Belfast artist Noel Murphy paints all 108 members of the Northern Ireland Assembly.	
.	15 Oct 2007	Bloody Cartoons	Karsten Kjær looks at the events when a small Danish newspaper chose to print a selection of cartoons depicting Muhammad.	
.	10 Oct 2007	Dinner with the President	President Musharraf explores the different influences on political life in Pakistan.	
.	9 Oct 2007	Looking for the Revolution	Looking at President Evo Morales' struggles building socialist policies in Bolivia.	
.	8 Oct 2007	Taxi to the Dark Side	Documentary investigating a young man's death just days after his arrest by US forces.	
.	8 Oct 2007	Russia's Village of Fools	Documentary about Russian patriot and businessman Mikhail Morozov.	
.	8 Oct 2007	Campaign! The Kawasaki Candidate	Filmmaker Kazuhiro Soda follows his friend Yamauchi on the campaign trail in Japan.	
.	7 Oct 2007	Egypt: We Are Watching You	Three Egyptian women start a movement to educate and empower the public.	
.	7 Oct 2007	Please Vote for Me	A group of Chinese schoolchildren learn about democracy for the first time.	
.	6 Oct 2007	Iron Ladies of Liberia	Documentary about Liberian president Ellen Johnson-Sirleaf.	
.	2 Oct 2007	Belgrade Radio Warriors – Turn On, Tune In, Slob Out	Documentary about the Belgrade youth radio station, B92.	
.	25 Sep 2007	Iraq in Fragments	Documentary which illuminates post-war Iraq in three acts.	
.	18 Sep 2007	The Undertaking	Documentary about American-Irish poet-philosopher, essayist and undertaker, Thomas Lynch.	
.	17 Sep 2007	This Film is Not Yet Rated	Documentary about the Motion Picture Association of America's rating system.	
.	11 Sep 2007	Glow of White Women	Examination of the personal impact of discriminatory laws in Apartheid era South Africa.	
.	10 Sep 2007	Hollywood Overnight	Documentary about the rise and fall of film maker Troy Duffy.	
.	10 Sep 2007	Riot On!	Award-winning documentary about the spectacular failure of a Finnish media company.	
.	4 Sep 2007	Andrew and Jeremy Get Married	The extraordinary love story between a retired bus driver and a retired teacher.	
.	16 Aug 2007	Children and Cancer – A Lion in the House	Documentary following the challenges facing five families with children who have cancer.	
.	5 Aug 2007	TV Junkie	Documentary about drug addiction, edited from home videos of a drug addict.	
.	18 Jul 2007	Every Good Marriage Begins with Tears	Bengali sisters travel from London to Bangladesh to undertake arranged marriages.	
.	15 Jul 2007	Once in a Lifetime	Players, coaches and journalists recall the all-star New York Cosmos of the seventies.	
.	27 Jun 2007	Kike Like Me	Jamie Kastner finds out what it means to be Jewish in the modern world.	
.	18 Jul 2007	Office Tigers: Part 4	Series which goes inside the closed world of Western corporate outsourcing.	
.	11 Jul 2007	Office Tigers: Part 3	Series which goes inside the closed world of Western corporate outsourcing.	
.	4 Jul 2007	Office Tigers: Part 2	Series which goes inside the closed world of Western corporate outsourcing.	
.	27 Jun 2007	Office Tigers: Part 1	Series which goes inside the closed world of Western corporate outsourcing.	
.	26 Jun 2007	Paris Brothel	Mark Kidel's film looks at the unique licensed brothels of Paris which existed until 1946.	
.	19 Jun 2007	Winged Migration	Oscar-nominated documentary on the migratory patterns of birds.	
.	16 Jun 2007	The Natural History of the Chicken	Documentary expanding the frontiers of popular awareness over the chicken's many virtues.	
.	9 Jun 2007	Laughing with Hitler	Examining the history of the Third Reich through the jokes told about the Nazis.	
.	22 Jan 2005	Why We Fight	Film exploring the joint venture between the US government and the arms industry.	
.	7 Jun 2007	Journeys with George	Alexandra Pelosi's informal portrait of George W. Bush, filmed over nearly a year.	
.	6 Jun 2007	Heirs to an Execution	Ivy Meeropol tells how her family was torn apart when her grandparents were executed.	
.	5 Jun 2007	RFK	David Grubin's biography reassesses the remarkable and tragic life of Bobby Kennedy.	
.	4 Jun 2007	How Vietnam Was Lost	The story of two seemingly unconnected events that changed the course of the Vietnam War.	
.	29 May 2007	Children of the Chinese Circus	Documentary looking at Shanghai Circus school.	
.	22 May 2007	Black Sun	Documentary about a blind man who travels the world alone.	
.	15 May 2007	How Much is Your Life Worth?	Documentary about the work of attorneys and adjusters involved in cases of wrongful death.	
.	8 May 2007	Oswald's Ghost	Documentary which deconstructs the mythologies surrounding the JFK assassination.	
.	24 Apr 2007	Cuba! Africa! Revolution: Part 2	Second of a two-part documentary telling the story of Cuba's interventions in Africa.	
.	24 Apr 2007	Cuba! Africa! Revolution: Part 1	Two-part documentary about Cuban intervention in Africa from the 1960s onwards.	
.	17 Apr 2007	A Story of People in War and Peace	Documentary about the First Nagorno-Karabakh War (1989–1994).	
.	11 Oct 2005	In Search of Gandhi	Indian filmmaker Lalit Vachani retreads the route of Mahatma Gandhi's famous Salt March.	
.	4 Jul 2005	Law of the Dragon	Series following the work of Judge Chen and his travelling court in China.	
.	17 March 2004	War Feels Like War	Spanish filmmaker Esteban Uyarra following Jacek Czarnecki, Bengt Kristiansen, Jan Kruse, P.J. O'Rourke, and Stephanie Sinclair, reporters and photographers, circumventing military media control to get access to a different perspective on the Iraq War.	

== See also ==
- Arena, a similar documentary series by the BBC
