= Vachani =

Vachani is a Gujarati surname. Notable people with the surname include:

- Ajit Vachani (1951–2003), Indian actor
- Lalit Vachani, Indian documentary filmmaker
