= The Big Melt =

- DVD cover
- Directed by: Jarvis Cocker and Martin Wallace
- Produced by: Crossover (Heather Croall and Mark Atkin); Lone Star (Martin Rosenbaum)
- Music by: Jarvis Cocker
- Release date: 12 June 2013
- Running time: 71 minutes
- Country: United Kingdom
- Language: English

The Big Melt (later subtitled How Steel Made Us Hard) is a documentary film about the Sheffield steel industry directed by Jarvis Cocker and Martin Wallace. It combines archive footage with a live soundtrack. The film was commissioned by BBC Storyville and BBC North, in association with the BFI.

== Synopsis ==
The film shows the manufacturing processes and the social history of the people behind it, going as far back as 1900. There is no narration. It includes both colour and black-and-white film. Footage includes a girl making shells in a munitions factory during the First World War, men working on the Tyne Bridge, and a propagandist cartoon imagining a world without steel.

== Production ==
The film was commissioned by BBC Storyville and BBC North in association with the BFI, using public funding from the National Lottery through Arts Council England.

The Big Melt followed From the Sea to the Land Beyond, a similar commission by Doc/Fest in 2012.

It was produced by Heather Croall and Mark Atkin and Martin Rosenbaum and directed by Jarvis Cocker and Martin Wallace for the 20th annual Sheffield Doc/Fest in 2013, to celebrate the centenary of the steel industry. The film was made using footage from the BFI National Archive.

Cocker was initially reluctant to be involved because he felt that Sheffield's Steel City image was a cliché. He agreed to take part after seeing footage of a boy putting two fingers up to the camera in the early 1900s, which reminded him of Kes, the film by Ken Loach.

The Big Melt was billed as "a brand new kind of heavy metal music", and as "a music and film journey into the soul of a nation, bringing to life the ghosts of our past, taking us into the belly of the furnaces and showing how our souls have been stamped from the mighty presses of our industrial heritage". The restoration and screening of the archive footage was done as part of the BFI's This Working Life: Steel project.

== The soundtrack ==
The soundtrack was performed live by Cocker accompanied by over 50 musicians, including many Sheffield artists. Some tracks were re-recorded for the official release of the documentary, while some were recorded live. Musicians included:

- Cocker's Pulp bandmates Candida Doyle, Steve Mackey and Nick Banks.
- Richard Hawley
- Members of The Verve.
- Members of The Human League.
- Unite the Union (City of Sheffield) Band, who played the acid house track ‘Voodoo Ray’.
- Sheffield Youth Choir
- The Forgemasters, a Sheffield DJ duo.
- Serafina Steer

The music played includes versions of:

- The Human League's 'Being Boiled' arranged for strings.
- A Guy Called Gerald’s 'Voodoo Ray' arranged for brass.
- The opening titles from Kes.
- Several Pulp songs including 'This Is Hardcore and 'Sheffield: Sex City'.
- Compositions by Carl Orff, The Forgemasters, Richard Hawley, All Seeing I, BBC Radiophonic Workshop, Serafina Steer and Max de Wardener.

== Release ==
The world premiere was on 12 June 2013 at the Crucible Theatre to an audience of nearly 1000 people. The film with accompanying soundtrack was screened at the Curzon Chelsea on 8 January 2014, and broadcast on the BBC's Storyville on 26 January 2014 under the title The Big Melt – How Steel Made Us Hard.

== Reception ==
The Guardian described the effect of the film as like "a really trippy educational video" and Wallace said he intended the film to be "fantastical, playful and challenging". The Observer called it "one of the best films ever to appear in the Storyville documentary strand".
