= Heather Croall =

Australian arts executive and filmmaker

Heather Croall AM
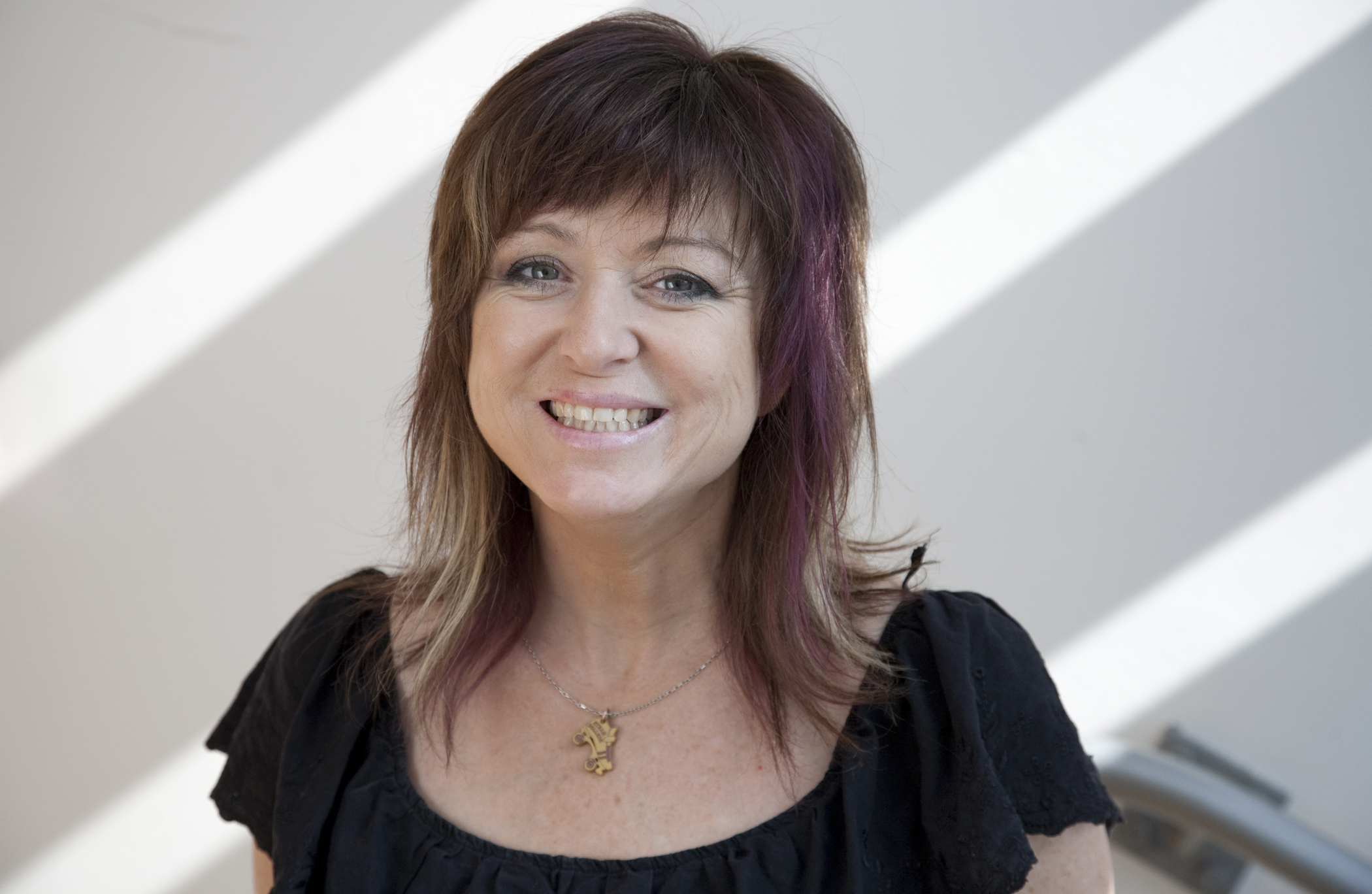
- Born: Heather Ann Croall; 1966 or 1967 (age 58–59); Blackpool, England
- Occupations: Filmmaker, arts administrator
- Known for: CEO / director, Sheffield DocFest (2006–2015); CEO / director, Adelaide Fringe (2015–2026)
- Notable work: Yer Old Faither (2020)

Heather Ann Croall AM (born 1966 or 1967) is an Australian arts administrator and documentary filmmaker. She is best known for leading Sheffield Doc/Fest in Sheffield, England, and Adelaide Fringe, in Adelaide, South Australia. She was CEO and artistic director of the Adelaide Fringe from 2015 - 2026. She was appointed Director of historic home and arts venue Carrick Hill on 20 February 2026. She wrote, directed, and co-produced Paradise Bent: Boys will be Girls in Samoa in 1999, and has co-produced several documentary films, including The Big Melt (2013), From Scotland with Love (2014), and Atomic, Living in Dread and Promise (2015). She co-wrote as well as directed and produced a documentary film made as a tribute to her father, Yer Old Faither, released in 2020.

== Early life and education ==
Heather Ann Croall was born in 1966 or 1967 in Blackpool, England, of Scottish parents originally from Glasgow. Her father, John, was a gynaecologist and obstetrician, and her mother, Ruth, had a love for the performing arts.

The family of five migrated as "Ten Pound Poms" to South Australia when Heather was three, and she grew up in the thriving industrial town of Whyalla, South Australia. The family attended many performances of touring musicians, dancers, and other stage performers, and also travelled to Adelaide to see more shows. John Croall was very highly regarded and well-liked in the community in Whyalla. For secondary school, Croall attended Pembroke School in Adelaide as a boarder.

Upon graduation from high school, Croall travelled to the UK and Europe, before returning to Adelaide and enrolling in a civil engineering degree. However, she found that this was not what she wanted to do as a career, so returned to the UK to work in the performing arts, particularly theatre and festivals.

Later, while working for the Adelaide Fringe, she enrolled for a BA at the University of South Australia, with a focus on cultural studies, documentary-making, and production for film and television.

== Career ==
=== Arts administration and production ===
In her early career, Croall worked as a company director, independent documentary producer, festival director, and consultant. In the early 1990s, she worked in the Adelaide Fringe in the Star Club, and from 1992 to 2002 ran the film event, "Shoot The Fringe". In 2001, she co-founded a cross-media initiative called "Crossover", which later became a major part of Sheffield Doc/Fest.

From 2000/1 to 2002/3, (Note: Conflicting dates are given by Experience Adelaide and McGregor.) she was manager, Industry Programs at the South Australian Film Corporation (SAFC), during which time she helped to set up various multi-platform initiatives, including the ABC "4 Minute Wonders" program, through which The People's Republic of Animation became more widely recognised.

In 2002 she programmed an event at the Adelaide Fringe called Digi Docs, and in 2004, another called Futureproof. In 2003, Croall developed a four-day screen event and think tank called Crossover Australia, for practitioners working in new media, as well as a one-day event at the Adelaide Film Festival called "Digi Day". She also undertook various cross-platform research and projects.

In 2003, Croall was appointed as festival director and CEO for the Australian International Documentary Conference, and developed the MeetMarket pitching event to secure funding for projects. The 2005 event attracted a record number of international buyers.

In 2006, Croall was invited to become CEO and festival director at Sheffield Doc/Fest. When she joined the festival, it was a two-day event attracting 500 delegates and 2000 public attendees. Croall widened it to a five-day event with 3000 delegates and 25,000 public attendees by 2013. She found new funding which tripled the budget in two years, and changed the date of the festival from November to June. She brought in the MeetMarket pitching forum, which in 2011 generated £5.6 million worth of business for producers. By the time of her last festival, industry delegate attendance had grown to over 3,200, and public attendance to over 26,000. In 2008, Variety magazine said Croall had lifted Doc/Fest "into the premier league of international doc events".

In February 2015, Croall left Doc/Fest to become CEO and festival director of the Adelaide Fringe, her first festival being a year later. Her contract was extended to 2020 after two successful festivals. She brought in a local version of the Meetmarket idea, called HoneyPot. In August 2016, under Croall's leadership, the Adelaide Fringe began an official partnership with the Edinburgh Fringe Festival, the world's largest fringe festival, and the festival continued to flourish even in the wake of the COVID-19 pandemic, with over a million ticket sales in 2023. On 17 November 2025 it was announced that Croall would be stepping down from the Adelaide Fringe role to take up an appointment as director of Carrick Hill, an historic home and arts venue in the Adelaide suburb Springfield, on 20 February 2026. She has been the longest-serving leader of the festival, and during her tenure, ticket sales rose from 450,000 to over a million a year.

=== Filmmaking ===
In 1993, Croall set up a film production company, Re Angle Pictures, to produce and direct documentaries.

Croall wrote, directed, and co-produced Paradise Bent: Boys will be Girls in Samoa, which tells the story of Samoan faʻafafines, or "third gender" people. In an old tradition, boys are raised as girls, playing an important domestic role in Samoan culture. The film screened in many international festivals from 1999 until 2002, and won the Silver Plaque at the 1999 Chicago International Film Festival.

In 2002, she produced, through her company Re Angle Pictures, We of Little Voice, written and directed by Peter Hodgson and featuring Aboriginal rights activist and anti-nuclear campaigner Kevin Buzzacott. The film shows the effect of uranium mining and the 1950s British nuclear testing in South Australia on Indigenous communities in the state. It was made with the assistance of SBS Independent and the Indigenous Unit of the Australian Film Commission, with support from the SAFC, as part of the National Indigenous Documentary Fund Series 5.

In 2012 Croall commissioned and co-produced a project at Doc/Fest especially for the festival, From the Sea to the Land Beyond. This is a documentary made up of archive footage from the British coast, directed by Penny Woolcock with an original soundtrack by British Sea Power.

In 2013 Croall co-produced The Big Melt, a documentary by Martin Wallace and Jarvis Cocker that similarly fused original music with archival footage. It was made to celebrate 100 years of stainless steel in Sheffield, with a live soundtrack scored by Jarvis Cocker, and opened the 20th Sheffield Doc/Fest at the Sheffield Crucible.

In 2014 Croall co-produced three films, again fusing archive footage with new, original soundtracks. Velorama told the story of a century of the bicycle. It was commissioned to mark the arrival of the 2014 Tour de France in Yorkshire, and directed by Daisy Asquith, with a soundtrack by Bill Nelson and Chumbawamba. Love Is All brought together director Kim Longinotto with Sheffield singer/songwriter Richard Hawley, formerly of Pulp, to explore the theme of love. And From Scotland with Love was commissioned as part of the Cultural Festival accompanying the 2014 Commonwealth Games, directed by Virginia Heath with a soundtrack by King Creosote.

In 2015 Croall co-produced two films, both for the BBC series Storyville. Atomic, Living in Dread and Promise was directed by Mark Cousins and soundtracked by Mogwai. The Show of Shows: 100 Years of Vaudeville, Circuses and Carnivals.

In 2016, she co-produced Girt by Sea for the Perth International Arts Festival on the theme of the Australian coast. Shane McNeil directed, with music by The Panics.

Croall co-wrote, directed, and produced a documentary film about her father and her home town of Whyalla, called Yer Old Faither, which premiered at the 2020 Adelaide Film Festival and won the Audience Award, Documentary. It was also selected for screening at the Glasgow Film Festival, and was screened at the Doc Edge film festival in New Zealand.

== Other activities and media appearances ==
In 2012 Croall sat on the US Documentary jury at the Sundance Film Festival,

She appeared on BBC Two's The Review Show (2011) and BBC Radio 4's The Media Show (2013). In 2013, she was one of 17 people from the film and television industries to sit on the 25th anniversary advisory committee for POV, a PBS documentary series in the United States.

In March 2019, Croall was an invited speaker at the Asian Conference on Arts & Humanities. The conference, held in Tokyo, Japan, was based on the theme "Reclaiming the Future".

== Accolades ==
Croall's 1999 film Paradise Bent: Boys will be Girls in Samoa won the Silver Plaque at the Chicago International Film Festival.

Croall was awarded an AIDC fellowship in 2005 "to research international developments in cross-platform documentary production", for which she spent time at WGBH-TV in Boston; the Bell Fund in Toronto; NESTA Futurelab; and the BBC in London. She was also a beneficiary of the Australian Film Commission Fellowship Program in 2005.

In 2011, Croall was named a trailblazer by Realscreen. The Alliance of Women Film Journalists named Croall 2013 Ambassador of Women's Films for her work "to boost documentary film and open opportunities for women filmmakers".

In 2014 she was awarded an honorary doctorate from Sheffield Hallam University, "for services to film and culture". In 2015 Croall received Sheffield Doc/Fest's Inspiration Award, which has been awarded since 2009 to someone "who has championed causes in the documentary world".

In 2018, she was the recipient of an Ambassador Award from the Governor's Aboriginal Employment Industry Cluster program (a joint initiative by state and federal governments, established in 2010), to recognise her contribution to the establishing of the Arts and Culture Cluster, as well as serving as the inaugural chair.

In 2020 Croall won the Leadership Award at the SA Woman Awards and in 2021, she was nominated as Leader of the Year in the South Australian Woman of the Year Awards. Also in 2021, she was awarded the Superhero Award at the Doc Edge Festival in New Zealand, in recognition of her outstanding contribution to the documentary industry.

Croall won the Festival Management CEO of the Year 2022 (Australia) as voted by CEO Monthly magazine. In 2023, Croall was listed in the Top 10 Most Admired Women Leaders by Success Pitchers magazine. In the same year, she was named SA Person of the Year at the SA Life Absolute Best Awards.

Croall was appointed a Member of the Order of Australia in the 2024 Australia Day Honours for "significant service to the performing arts, as an administrator, advocate and film maker".

== Personal life ==
Former politician Lyn Breuer was a family friend in Whyalla.

Croall has been friends with journalist and commentator Annabel Crabb, whom she met when they were in their early 20s, and bought a house at Aldinga Beach together.

== Selected filmography ==
=== As producer ===
- We of Little Voice (2002)
- From the Sea to the Land Beyond (2012)
- The Big Melt (2013)
- Velorama (2014)
- Love Is All (2014)
- From Scotland with Love (2014)
- Atomic, Living in Dread and Promise (2015)
- The Show of Shows: 100 Years of Vaudeville, Circuses and Carnivals (2015)
- Girt by Sea (2016)
- Yer Old Faither(2020)

=== As writer, director, producer ===
- Paradise Bent: Boys will be Girls in Samoa (1999)
- Yer Old Faither (2020)
