= Jennifer Fox (documentary filmmaker) =

American film producer (born 1959)

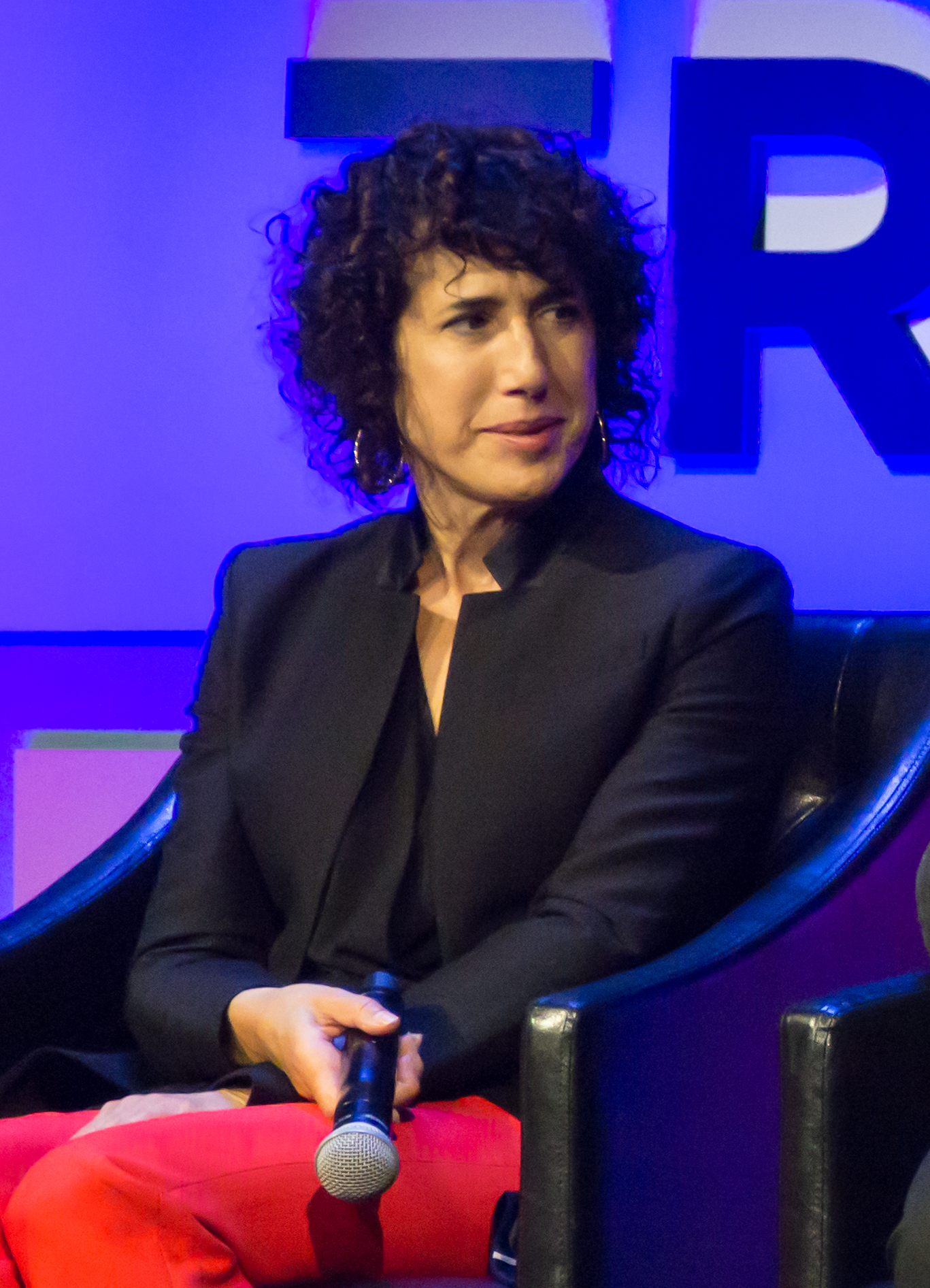
- Jennifer Fox at the 2018 Tribeca Film Festival
- Born: 1959 (age 66–67); Narberth, Pennsylvania, U.S.
- Occupations: Director; producer; writer; cinematographer
- Years active: 1980–present
- Spouse: Patrick Lindenmaier
- Website: A Luminous Mind Production

Jennifer Fox (born 1959) is an American film producer, director, cinematographer, and writer as well as president of A Luminous Mind Film Productions. She won the Grand Jury Prize at Sundance for her first feature documentary, Beirut: The Last Home Movie. Her 2010 documentary My Reincarnation had its premiere at the International Documentary Film Festival in Amsterdam (IDFA) in 2010, where it won a Top 20 Audience Award.

== Early life ==
Jennifer Fox was born into a Jewish family in 1959 in Narberth, Pennsylvania. Her father, Richard J. Fox, was a U.S. Navy pilot who served in the Korean War and co-founded Fox Companies, a property construction firm in Pennsylvania and New Jersey. Her mother, Geraldine Dietz Fox, after losing hearing in her left ear at the age of 27, helped to establish the National Institute on Deafness and other Communication Disorders (NIDCD) and founded the National Organization for Hearing Research Foundation (NOHR) in 1988. One of five children, Fox attended primary school at the Quaker Germantown Friends School in Philadelphia.

Fox knew she wanted to be a filmmaker from a young age after seeing the film Funny Girl, for an aunt's birthday. In 1980 she graduated from Johns Hopkins University with a degree in Creative Writing, and in 1981 dropped out of New York University to film Beirut: The Last Home Movie.

== Career ==
In 1981, Fox left NYU to accompany her friend and classmate, Gaby Bustros, to her ancestral home in Beirut, a 200-year-old Ottoman palace that had been bombed during the Lebanese Civil War. Here, she filmed the documentary Beirut: The Last Home Movie (1987). A cinéma vérité-style documentary, Fox follows the Bustros family as they continue to live in their ruined mansion and survive the civil war. While the film was a critical success, winning for best Cinematography and the Grand Jury Prize for Best Documentary at the Sundance Film Festival in 1988, Fox suffered post traumatic stress disorder upon finishing the film.

Fox's next project, An American Love Story (1999), was inspired by her own experiences of racism towards interracial relationships. While dating a black man in the early '90s, her shock towards the racism from strangers and family inspired her to create the cinéma vérité documentary about Bill Sims' and Karen Wilson's interracial relationship. The 10-part series first aired on September 12, 1999 on PBS and ran for five consecutive nights. Filming lasted over a year and a half, as Fox and one other crew member moved into the couple's Queen's apartment to chronicle their daily lives. Generating over 1,000 hours of film, the documentary covers everything from Bill's fluctuating career as a musician and Karen's declining health to the serious disapproval and ostracization the couple faced as they attempt to raise their family. The film won a Gracie Award for best Television Series in 2000, and was named "One of the Top Ten Television Series of 1999" by The New York Times.

Fox spent the next five years filming her third documentary Flying: Confessions of a Free Woman (2006), another made for TV documentary series, consisting of six hour-long segments. Combining personal memoir with cinéma vérité-style filming, "pass the camera" shooting, interviews and narration, Fox attempts to understand her own identity as a woman in relation to women around the world. Loosely organized around her own affair with an unnamed married South African lover and her familial upbringing, Fox supplements her own experience with clips from over 1,600 hours' worth of interviews and footage of women around the world and their experience of being a woman. Revolving around what Fox defines as "this modern female life," Flying: Confessions of a Free Woman, represents a sort of feminist manifesto for Fox. The film itself has been met by some criticism regarding its comparative qualities, with Zoe Williams questioning whether it is all that productive to compare experiences of oppression and Fox's centralized role.

Fox's fourth documentary film My Reincarnation (2011) was filmed over the course of 20 years. After the struggle of filming and promoting Beirut: The Last Home Movie, Fox began travelling with Buddhist master Namkhai Norbu, in 1989, as his secretary. As she was introduced to his 18-year-old son, Yeshi, Fox began recording their lives. After leaving to work on other projects, Fox reconnected with Namkhai and returned 13 years later to film Yeshi and his father as they struggle to connect and balance modern life and traditional beliefs. The film was partially funded by a Kickstarter campaign for $150,456 after one of Fox's original backers fell through. Due to the gap in filming, the documentary fluctuates between an interview based style and cinéma vérité. The film was first released in the U.S. on June 21, 2006 on PBS's POV series.

In 2018, Fox directed the film The Tale (2018), inspired by her own experience as a survivor of child sexual abuse. Unlike her previous works, the film is not a documentary but a narrative film, with the script inspired by transcripts of real conversations. The film features Academy Award-winning actress Laura Dern, and premiered at the Sundance film festival on January 20, 2018 and on HBO on May 26, 2018. The plot of the film directly references Fox's own experience of recognizing and grappling with her own abuse history.

Inspired by the filming of Flying: Confessions of a Free Woman, Fox started to recollect her dating life as a young girl, connecting it to the stories of rape and abuse suffered by the women she was interviewing. However it wasn't until her mother found a story, titled The Tale, written by Fox in middle school depicting the relationship between her and her adult running coach, that Fox realized the relationship constituted sexual abuse. At just 13, she had seen the relationship as consensual, a mindset that wouldn't shift until re-reading the story as an adult.

"What I was hearing [stories of sexual abuse] sounded so much like my own little private story that I called a relationship, there was this seismic crack in my body. Suddenly I realized what I protected in my mind as special and unique was not unique at all. It was the paradigm of sexual abuse."

While writing the script, Fox developed the idea of "issue-based fiction," in which she is able to use storytelling to "dive into issues that people could learn from and experience." Borrowing from her documentary filmmaking, Fox collaborated extensively on the production of the film, outreaching to mental health advocates, lawyers, sexual abuse survivors, and women's lived experiences to transform narrative into a tool for change. Along with HBO, Fox was able to develop a resource website and viewing guides to accompany the film to be used in educating and opening up the conversation about childhood sexual abuse, the effects of trauma, and memory.

The Tale was nominated for the Grand Jury Prize at Sundance in 2018, the best international film at the Munich Film Festival, the best Narrative Feature at the Melbourne International Film Festival, and for Outstanding Television Movie at the 2018 Primetime Emmy Awards.

In March 2023, Fox named the running coach sexually abused her in 1973 as Ted Nash. Nash, a renowned Olympic medalist in rowing and Olympic rowing coach, had also coached girls and women in running. He had died in 2021.

Jennifer Fox is also a teacher and educator. For the past 25 years she has held ongoing classes in New York City and hosts international masterclasses on producing, directing, screenwriting, and creating your own visual language. She is currently an Adjunct Professor at New York University.

== Style and themes ==
Much of Fox's early work is shot in the style of cinéma vérité filmmaking and she is one of the main filmmakers featured within Peter Wintonick's documentary Cinéma Vérité: Defining the Moment. Her style, however, is different from pure vérité as she notably includes interviews with her subjects in an attempt to reveal more of their character and psychology. Paired with her handheld, observational style, the combination of interview and vérité creates films that attempt to depict both the exterior and interior of their characters.

Much of Fox's work deals with understanding trauma. In films like The Tale and Flying: Confessions of a Free Woman, trauma is examined in relation to memory and womanhood. In both films Fox is interested in how past trauma is able to shape one's life and memory, using personal stories as a way to examine its effects. She also explores the process of ongoing trauma in films like Beirut: the Last Home Movie and An American Love Story. Fox often uses documentary films to observe the effects of trauma on present-day life by focusing on not only what her subjects do but why they do them.

== Personal life ==
Fox is married to Swiss cinematographer Patrick Lindenmaier.

== Awards and honors ==
Fox's first film Beirut: The Last Home Movie won the Grand Prize for Best Documentary film and the prize for Best Cinematography at the 1988 Sundance Film Festival. It also won Le Premier Prix for Best Documentary at the 1988 Cinéma du Réel festival in Paris. Her second documentary, An American Love Story won a Gracie Award for Best Television Series and was named "One of the Top Ten Television Series of 1999" by The New York Times, Time, The New York Daily News, Time Out, and The Boston Globe. My Reincarnation won an Audience Award at the International Documentary Film Festival in Amsterdam and was nominated for an Emmy Award in 2013. She has produced award winning films like Love and Diane; On the Ropes; Double Exposure; Cowboys, Lawyers and Indians; Absolutely Safe; and Project Ten: Real Stories From a Free South Africa. Her most recent film, The Tale, was nominated for two Emmy Awards and the Grand Jury Prize at Sundance. It won for best screenplay and editing at the Durban International Film Festival, and Laura Dern has won for Best Actress in Movie/Limited Series at the Gold Derby Awards and OFTA Television Awards.

== Filmography ==
Year	Film	Credited as			
Year	Film	Director	Writer	Producer	Cinematographer
1987	Beirut: The Last Home Movie	Yes	Yes		
1999	An American Love Story	Yes	Yes		Yes
1999	On the Ropes			Yes	
2002	Love and Diane			Yes	
2004	Mix			Yes	
2006	Looking for Busi	Yes			Yes
2006	Flying: Confessions of a Free Woman	Yes		Yes	
2007	Absolutely Safe			Yes	
2010	Upstate			Yes	
2010	My Reincarnation	Yes		Yes	Yes
2011	Maori Boy Genius			Yes	
2011	Cat Scratch Fever			Yes	
2014	She's Lost Control			Yes	
2015	Daddy Don't Go			Yes	
2017	The Pathological Optimist			Yes	
2018	The Tale	Yes	Yes	Yes	
2018	The Rest I Make Up			Yes	
