= The Srebrenica Tape =

2025 German–Austrian documentary film

- Directed by: Chiara Sambuchi
- Produced by: Antje Böhmert
- Narrated by: Alisa Smajlović
- Cinematography: Pablo Pisacane
- Edited by: Claudia Linzer; Torsten Striegnitz
- Music by: Hannes Gill; Luca Ciut
- Production companies: BSX Schmölzer; Docdays Productions
- Release date: 23 March 2025 (Netherlands)
- Running time: 89 minutes
- Countries: Germany; Austria
- Languages: Bosnian; English; Serbian

The Srebrenica Tape – From Dad, for Alisa (also subtitled Messages of Love from the War) is a 2025 documentary film following a Yugoslavian woman, Alisa Smajlović, who returns to Srebrenica to learn more about her father, Sejfo, who was murdered in the Srebrenica massacre in 1995. Filmed in the United States, Bosnia and Herzegovina and Serbia, the film was a co-production of Germany and Austria and comprises Smaljović's road trip in Bosnia intercut with video footage recorded by her father prior to the massacre.

== Premise ==
Alisa Smajlović is a Yugoslavian woman, born in Ljubovija, Serbia to a Bosnian Muslim father and a Serbian mother. During the Bosnian War, she went to live in Serbia with her maternal grandparents, while her father and mother remained in Srebrenica, where he was killed during the Srebrenica massacre. After moving to the United States, Alisa returns to Bosnia to learn more about her father and to identify and locate people featured in the tape.

== Production ==
Following the outbreak of the Bosnian War, Smajlović was sent to Ljubovija, Serbia to live with her grandparents. Her father Sejfo, lived in Srebrenica, where he recorded footage of daily life in the town; the tape of all the recordings totalled over four hours of footage which had filmed specifically for Alisa. It was filmed between 1993 and 1995. The film also includes archival footage of the war.

== Release ==
The Srebrenica Tape had its worldwide premiere at the 44th Movies That Matter festival in the Hague, Netherlands. It was also screened at Dok.fest Munich, Diagonale and the Sarajevo Film Festival.

The Srebrenica Tape premiered in the United Kingdom on BBC Four on 1 July 2025, as part of its Storyville documentary film series.

== Reception ==
Cineuropa gave the film a positive review, describing it as "a touching personal investigation of some of the darkest years in contemporary regional history". It was described as a "companion piece" to the 2020 drama film Quo Vadis, Aida?, directed by Jasmila Žbanić.
