= Every Good Marriage Begins with Tears =

- Promotional poster
- Directed by: Simon Chambers
- Written by: Simon Chambers
- Produced by: Simon Chambers
- Starring: Shahanara Begum; Hushnara Begum
- Narrated by: Simon Chambers
- Edited by: Benjamin Putland; Emiliano Battista
- Music by: Rabindranath Tagore; Odithi Mohsin
- Distributed by: Films Transit International
- Release date: 3 November 2006 (Sheffield Doc/Fest)
- Running time: 62 minutes
- Country: United Kingdom
- Languages: English, Bengali

Every Good Marriage Begins with Tears is a 2006 British documentary film produced, directed and written by Simon Chambers. The film is about two sisters born and raised in London in the traditions of their native Bangladesh, going through the process of arranged marriages to men chosen by their parents.

== Overview ==
Shahanara Begum is quick-witted, coarse-mannered, in her early 20s and has embraced Western life. But her lifestyle has turned her father to banish her from the family. To pacify him and heal old wounds with her mother, she agrees to marry a man that her family has chosen for her. The film begins with her meeting him at the airport for the first time since they were wed in Bangladesh six months prior. Midway through the film, we learn it was an unhappy marriage and, having left after a few months, she was again banished from her family and dating another (also married) older man.

Meanwhile, Shahanara's younger sister, Hushnara Begum, is submissive, devout, quiet, and dutiful, and obeys her father and their domineering elder sister. Hushnara is being groomed for her own arranged marriage, something that at the age of 19 she does not feel ready for. When her parents inform her they have decided she will marry a man in Bangladesh that she has never met, she agrees. However, as her wedding day draws closer, her misgivings grow stronger.

The thrust of the film is on Hushnara's wedding in Bangladesh—the only time in which Bangladeshi women are treated like royalty (literally being hand-fed)-- yet the main protagonist is clearly Shahanara. When her father excludes her from the airplane tickets for the wedding, Shahanara buys her own and plans to sneak into the wedding. However, this plan backfires when she learns her mother-in-law had trekked through the floods to beg her to reunite with her estranged husband.

The effects of Shahanara's turbulent relationship with her family becomes starkly apparent in the scenes after the wedding, as she wanders awkwardly around a city in Bangladesh, keeping her distance. Later, back in London, we see she has left the older man and is now obsessed with a TV show host. As one reviewer writes, "Despite her claims to 'independence' she [Shahanara] appears to move from one man to another, claiming that each of them offers her the support and understanding that her family has denied her. Her quest for the idolized TV presenter has a somewhat painful quality, and viewers may well wonder what lies ahead for this woman."

Despite having misgivings (and actually fainting during her wedding), we later see Hushnara back in London, flirting playfully with her new husband. The film ends with the eldest sister offering to arrange a marriage for Simon (the director).

== Development ==
Every Good Marriage Begins with Tears takes its title from an old Kyrgyz saying. The film is produced, directed, written by Simon Chambers. It was Chambers' feature debut after several documentary shorts.

== Release ==
Every Good Marriage Begins With Tears is distributed by Films Transit International. On 3 November 2006, it received its world premiere at Sheffield Doc/Fest. On 26th in the same month, it was screened at the International Documentary Film Festival Amsterdam in Amsterdam. On 13 March 2007, it was screened at the Oxford International Documentary Film Festival. On 27 April of the same year, it was screened at the East End Film Festival. In June 2007, it was screened at the Royal Anthropological Institute (RAI) Film Festival. It was also screened at Film Southasia in Nepal. On 30 June 2013, it was screened at Cutting East Film Festival.

On 21 May 2009, the film was broadcast by BBC Four on documentary series Storyville. It was bought by around 20 countries for television transmission.

== Reception ==
Leslie Felperin of Variety said, "Every Good Marriage Begins With Tears takes a humorous and deeply personal look at the experience of two London-based girls of Bangladeshi extraction whom their family tries to marry off."

Diana Lodderhose of OPEN said, "...the film explores the universal theme of love and generational conflict between the daughters’ ideas and their parents. It dispels myths about Islam's treatment of women and puts a human face on the communities lately being targeted as a result of the terrorist attacks on the West."

Mark Deming of The New York Times described it as "Two sisters living in England whose family have raised them in the traditions of their native Bangladesh have very different perspectives on the issue of arranged marriage."

International Documentary Film Festival Amsterdam said, "The film offers a rare, candid and humorous glimpse into the life of a family and the clash of generations and cultures." Cutting East Film Festival said, "This funny poignant film gives an insight into the effect both positive and negative an arranged marriage has on a family and on the community."

== Awards and nominations ==
Year	Award	Category	Result
2006	Royal Anthropological Institute	Best Documentary	Won
2006	Romadoc	Best Documentary	Won
2006	La Huesca International Film Festival	Best Documentary	Won
2006	Ismalia International Film Festival	Best Documentary	Won
2006	Grierson Awards	Best Newcomer	Nominated
2006	Parnu	Honorable Mention	Nominated

== See also ==
- Arranged marriage in the Indian subcontinent
- British Bangladeshi
