= Tulku (film) =

- DVD cover
- Directed by: Gesar Mukpo
- Written by: Gesar Mukpo
- Produced by: Kent Martin
- Starring: Gesar Mukpo; Dylan Henderson; Ashoka Mukpo; Dzongsar Khyentse; Wyatt Arnold; Ogyen Trinley Dorje; Reuben Adrian Derksen
- Narrated by: Gesar Mukpo
- Cinematography: Pablo Bryant; Ethan Neville
- Production company: National Film Board of Canada
- Release date: May 25, 2009 (DOXA Documentary Film Festival)
- Running time: 75 minutes
- Country: Canada
- Language: English

Tulku is a 2009 documentary film, written and directed by Gesar Mukpo. The film details the personal experiences of five young Western men who were identified in childhood as being tulkus, or reincarnated Tibetan Buddhist masters.

For over 700 years tulkus have been sought out as revered leaders and teachers of Tibetan Buddhism. Beginning in the 1970s, several tulkus have been identified as having incarnated in the West. These new, Western-born, very modern tulkus lead lives prone to culture clash and identity confusion.

== Background ==
Gesar Mukpo, who wrote and directed Tulku, was born in 1973, the son of Tibetan Buddhist master Chögyam Trungpa Rinpoche and his British wife Diana. At the age of three, Mukpo was identified by Dilgo Khyentse Rinpoche as the reincarnation of the late Shechen Kongtrul Rinpoche (the Jamgon Kongtrul of Shechen), one of his father's teachers in Tibet. Three-year-old Gesar was then enthroned as a tulku in Berkeley, California.

In the film, Mukpo's British mother describes her marriage to a Tibetan monk, and her vision in a dream of a being who asked to be her son. When Gesar was born and was identified as a tulku, his father believed he could be a great teacher, but did not send him away to a monastery, believing it would separate him from his environment too much.

Mukpo, whose father died in 1987, lives an ordinary secular life in Halifax, Nova Scotia. He has a daughter, is separated from his wife, and is a music video director and producer. Aware of the irony of his situation and the ambiguity of his life purpose, in the film he sets out to interview other Western tulkus to see if their disorientation is similar to his own, and to see how each has coped with the unique status of Western-born tulku. Mukpo travels to various locations to interview other young Western tulkus and the significant people in their lives.

== Synopsis ==
Gesar Mukpo begins by interviewing a fellow Canadian, Dylan Henderson, who was the first Caucasian tulku discovered in the West, recognized in 1975 by Chögyam Trungpa Rinpoche as the incarnation of one of his teachers. The identification was confirmed by Rangjung Rigpe Dorje, the 16th Karmapa, who requested that Henderson come to the Rumtek Monastery in India for the rest of his life. Chögyam Trungpa, however, recommended that he remain in the West. Henderson maintains his Buddhist studies and practices, but without the form and structure present in the East. He has a degree in anthropology and history.

In New York City, Mukpo visits his younger half-brother Ashoka Mukpo, who was also identified as a tulku. Ashoka, like Gesar, leads a secular life, working in the U.S. division of Human Rights Watch. Although he has not adopted the life of a Buddhist tulku, he has a thangka wall-hanging portrait of his previous incarnation, Khamyon Rinpoche, in his apartment. Ashoka was enthroned as a tulku in Tibet, and found the experience, as well as the expectations of others, intense and at times uncomfortable. He feels his path is not to be a teacher, wearing monk's robes, but to help others and give back in ways appropriate to his location and culture.

Mukpo visits the Tibetan refugee colony of Bir in Northern India, which since the 1950s has welcomed fleeing Tibetans after the Chinese occupation of Tibet. He interviews his mentor Dzongsar Khyentse Rinpoche, with whom he studied in India instead of attending college. Khyentse, who is a filmmaker (The Cup, Travelers and Magicians) as well as a Buddhist master, speaks about the development of the tulku system, and also about its flaws and possible failings, especially as Buddhism spreads in the West. Mukpo describes his own internal conflict between his Buddhist side and his Western side, lamenting both the incongruousness of the practice when he became a teen and wanted to fit in, and the pressure and obligation he has felt because he bears the designation.

Mukpo meets a 20-year-old from San Francisco, Wyatt Arnold, who has been studying the Tibetan language in India for the past year. Arnold was identified as a tulku as a young child and enthroned at the age of five. He was slated to go to India at that time, but his parents decided against it. Arnold speaks about his early memories of his former incarnation, and about his fond memories of his childhood Tibetan Buddhist teacher in the U.S., Chagdud Tulku Rinpoche. Arnold seems conflicted about his role and task, and seeks advice and feedback from Mukpo, who is 14 years his senior.

In Nepal, Mukpo visits the Shechen Monastery. This brings back fond memories. When Mukpo was 15, his father died, and his mother sent him there to study with Dilgo Khyentse Rinpoche for a year. While in Nepal, Mukpo also interviews Reuben Derksen, who was born in Amsterdam in 1986, raised in Nepal and Bhutan, and recognized as a tulku at the age of 11. Derksen is the most cynical of the tulkus interviewed, having had a largely negative experience at the Tibetan Buddhist monastery in India he lived at for three years following high school. Although he no longer considers himself a Buddhist, he returns annually to emcee the weeklong Buddhist ceremony in Bhutan, because his presence makes the people there so happy.

Returning home to Halifax and his family, Mukpo reflects upon his life and upon the experiences of the tulkus and teachers he has interviewed. He admits that there are no easy answers to the complications and contradictions of being a Westerner identified as a Tibetan tulku in a modern, rapidly changing world. One compensation to the culture conflict is the meaningful connection formed to beloved teachers, communities, and heritages. Speaking about his fellow Western tulkus, he concludes, "There is no certain path for any of us, other than the path of self-discovery."

== Cast ==
- Gesar Mukpo
- Dylan Henderson
- Ashoka Mukpo
- Dzongsar Khyentse Rinpoche
- Wyatt Arnold
- Ogyen Trinley Dorje
- Reuben Adrian Derksen
- Diana Mukpo

== Production ==
To fund the film, Gesar Mukpo approached the National Film Board of Canada, as part of the Reel Diversity Competition for emerging filmmakers of colour. According to Mukpo:

I had applied to the Reel Diversity program before and not gotten it. So I was skeptical about applying again. A couple of days before the deadline, I hadn't written anything, and I sat down and thought, Screw it, I might as well tell my story.

I didn't want to look and fish for some story. It was just there. I poured it out in two paragraphs.... The idea wrote itself.

This was something that was real, it was true, and it's a story I could tell in a way that nobody else could. As a filmmaker, that's what you want — to make people connect with something real and intimate. I felt this story had that. It's my story.

Tulku took two years to complete, and was shot on location in Nova Scotia, Florida, New York City, India, and Nepal. While Mukpo was filming in Bir, two local Westerners offered to take him and his cameraman paragliding for free, resulting in beautiful aerial shots of Northern India. The film also features rare archival footage from Tibet, and archival footage and photographs of Tibetan masters such as Chögyam Trungpa Rinpoche, Rangjung Rigpe Dorje, and Chagdud Tulku Rinpoche.

The soundtrack to the film includes two featured songs by Don Brownrigg: "In It", and "Remember Home".

== Release ==
Tulku premiered on May 25, 2009, at the DOXA Documentary Film Festival. It was also an official selection at the Vancouver International Film Festival, the International Buddhist Film Festival, the Buddhist Film Festival Europe, the Atlantic Film Festival, and the Calgary International Film Festival.

The film was televised on August 10, 2010, on the CBC News Network's program, The Passionate Eye. The film also screened at Boulder Theater in Boulder, Colorado on August 18, 2010.

The special edition DVD of the film was released in March 2011 by Festival Media. The DVD includes 60 minutes of bonus features, including a 35-minute uncut in-depth interview with Dzongsar Khyentse Rinpoche, and a candid 20-minute post-film interview with Gesar Mukpo reflecting on the film and his life and place in the world.

== Critical reception ==
Tulku has received favorable print reviews. Shambhala Sun called it "intensely personal", and The Coast described the documentary as "both inspiring and, like Mukpo, endearingly down to earth."

Angela Pressburger, daughter of British filmmaker Emeric Pressburger, deemed Tulku an "intimate and honest exploration". Writing in the Shambhala Times, she also observed, at the film's premiere:

[T]he film turned out to be a sleeper-hit with young working people and sold out; the Buddhist community filled only a couple of rows. Three weeks later, Tulku played again, in a bigger theater, and all three shows were packed. So clearly this film has something to say to young adults, whatever their station in life. Perhaps this points to the fact that it’s not only Tulkus who have a hard time figuring out who they are. Those who have to deal with famous parents, high family expectations, or just trying to establish life-goals based on their inner being rather than on outside propaganda, clearly find this a universal theme.

The Guardian gave a full rundown of the film, plus extended background on Mukpo and his father, and stated that the film "examin[es] the bewildering plight of the western tulku".

== See also ==
- Unmistaken Child
- My Reincarnation
- Rinpoche
