= Mark Atkin =

British filmmaker

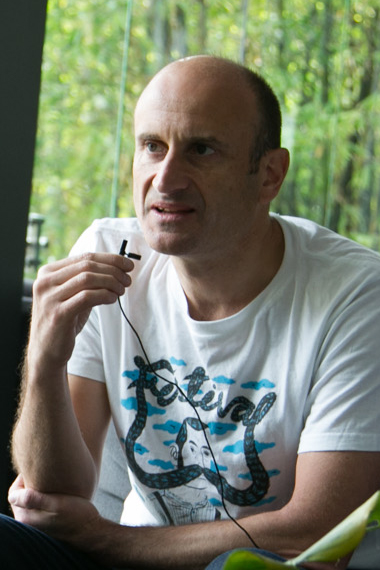
- Atkin in 2014
- Occupation: Director, Crossover
- Known for: The Big Melt; From the Sea to the Land Beyond

Mark Atkin is a British filmmaker. As of 2015, he is a director at Crossover Labs, where he has directed and produced various films including The Big Melt and From the Sea to the Land Beyond. As of 2015, he has worked with Sheffield Doc/Fest since 2008, producing documentaries such as Digging for Grandad's Gold and From the Sea to the Land Beyond, which was the subject of a TEDx talk he presented.

== Career ==
From 1998 to 2008, Atkin was a commissioning editor for TV and online at Australia's Special Broadcasting Service (SBS), where his work included Taxi to the Dark Side and Waltz with Bashir. At SBS, he was also responsible for securing broadcast rights to early seasons of South Park. In 2006, he attended the MeetMarket at Sheffield Doc/Fest as a buyer. In November 2008, he left SBS and began work at MeetMarket as producer and executive producer for three different documentaries. One of these was Digging for Grandad's Gold, in which Atkin journeys to Poland in search of valuables that his Jewish grandfather buried on the family property in 1939 before fleeing from the German invasion. While in Sheffield, Atkin also collaborated with Doc/Fest's director Heather Croall and Frank Boyd of Unexpected Media to create the film production company Crossover.

As of 2013, Atkins is a marketplace consultant for the Australian International Documentary Conference, organising the international co-production market. As of 2015, he is the head of the Documentary Campus Masterschool and presents courses there. He ran workshops at Sheffield Doc/Fest in 2012 and 2013. After co-producing From the Sea to the Land Beyond, Atkin spoke about the project at in a TED talk at TEDxSheffield in 2012.

In 2013 Atkin co-developed Animal Planet's Walking the Nile for Channel 4 in his role as multiplatform commissioning editor. In 2015 Atkin was the acting director of the Sheffield Doc/Fest, and in 2015 and 2016 he curated the virtual reality section of the festival.
