= Beirut: The Last Home Movie =

- Film poster
- Directed by: Jennifer Fox
- Written by: Jennifer Fox; John Mullen
- Cinematography: Alex Nepomniaschy
- Edited by: John Mullen
- Music by: Lanny Meyers; Ziad Rahbani
- Release date: 1987 (London Film Festival)
- Running time: 123 minutes
- Country: United States
- Language: English

Beirut: The Last Home Movie is a 1987 documentary film directed by Jennifer Fox. It follows the life of Gaby Bustros and her family, who live in a 200-year-old mansion in Beirut during the Lebanese Civil War. The Bustros family, one of the noble families of Beirut, remain in their ancestral home despite the endless war that surrounds them.

== Exhibition ==
The film was screened at the Berlin Film Festival, the London Film Festival, and at INPUT, the International Television Conference. It was broadcast on US television as a Frontline special on PBS in 1991. The film was awarded the Excellence In Cinematography Award and won the Grand Jury Prize Documentary at the 1988 Sundance Film Festival. It opened at the Film Forum in NYC in 1988 and did a thirty city US theatrical release, distributed by Circle Releasing, before airing as a Frontline Special on PBS in 1990.

== Awards ==
- Sundance Film Festival Grand Jury Prize Best Documentary
- Sundance Film Festival Best Cinematography
- Soc. Civile des Aut. - Multimedia Best Screenplay
- Women and Cinema Argentina - Press Award
- C.I.N.E. - Golden Eagle Award
- San Francisco Film Festival - Golden Gate Award
- Cinéma du Réel (Paris) - Grand Prix

Awards
Preceded by Sherman's March	Sundance Grand Jury Prize: Documentary; 1988	Succeeded by For All Mankind
