= Patrick Dils =

Frenchman exonerated of murder

Patrick Dils (born 30 June 1970 in Longeville-lès-Metz) is a French victim of a miscarriage of justice. He was accused of the murder of two boys in Montigny-lès-Metz, in Moselle on 30 April 1987, at the age of 16. On 27 January 1989, the court sentenced him to life imprisonment for murder. On 24 April 2002 after spending 15 years in prison, he was exonerated. The French government gave him one million euros (of which 700,000 euros in compensation) for judicial mistake. This is one of the most serious judicial mistakes recognised in France and it's the first one concerning a minor sentenced to life imprisonment for murder.

== Case ==
On 28 September 1986, two children, Cyril Beining (b. 1978), and Alexandre Beckrich, were found dead alongside a SNCF track in Montigny-lès-Metz. Patrick Dils, who was 16 years old at the time and a trainee cook, was questioned because he lived on the same street as the victims, and because he had been denounced by an anonymous call. His timetable did not match with the hour of the murder indicated by the coroner, so he was released.

On 28 April 1987, following a new testimony which reconsidered the time of death indicated by the coroner, Dils was taken in for questioning after finishing his shift at a restaurant in Montigny-lès-Metz. After 36 hours in custody and police interrogation which lasted a few days, Dils admitted the murders and stated that he didn't know the reasons for the crimes.

On 30 April 1987, Dils was charged with voluntary homicides and sent to the prison of Metz-Queuleu. He gave a different version to his attorney but the investigating judge organized a reconstruction on 7 May during which Dils continued to admit the crime. Moreover, he recognized the rocks which served for the crime. This fact convinced the judge of his guilt. According to Dils' parents, he didn't realize the importance of the procedure. On the 30 May 1987, Dils wrote to his attorney to modify his declarations.

== Investigation ==
Seven months passed between the murder and Dils' arrest. Dils' parents categorized judicial police inspector for the city of Metz Bernard Varlet, who was in charge of the investigation, as very aggressive and relentless toward Dils. Varlet had already obtained confessions from two other suspects, but these were rejected.

Throughout the investigation investigators obtained confessions from three different people, all single, living with their parents and having a low level of education. The first suspect who confessed was Mr. L., on 10 December 1986, who worked one hundred meters from the scene of the murder. According to the report of the hearing, he accurately described the bike and children's clothing. Police doubted his confession after he failed to climb up a slope at the crime scene during a reconstruction.

On 12 February 1987, investigators arrested a new suspect for "outraging public decency." After confessing, he was eventually also exonerated because of inconsistencies in his testimony. Dils was the last remaining suspect investigators had. They believed he was guilty despite the inconsistencies that remained around the timeline of the murder, and the difficulty that a teenager may have had in causing the extreme physical violence acts perpetrated on the victims.

The judge at the time, Ms. Mireille Maubert, appeared to have the same view as the investigators. When Dils' parents requested permission to visit their son, she responded that they would never see him again. For sixteen months she repeatedly refused to grant Dils' parents permission to visit their son.

== Sentencing ==
On 27 January 1989, Dils was convicted of murder and sentenced to life by the juvenile Cour d'assises of Moselle. The court did not take into account that Dils was a minor, despite the defense having repeatedly reminded the court of this fact and despite the fact that at the time, Dils being a minor would have entitled him to the possibility of his life sentence being limited to a maximum term of 25 years. Despite the death penalty having been abolished for minors in 1980 in France (and then fully in 1981), victims' parents put forth that they would have preferred a death penalty conviction for Patrick Dils.

After sentencing and for the first time since April 1987, Dils' parents were allowed to see him for five minutes, in a corridor and under police surveillance.

== Appeals ==
Dils' lawyers filed the first request for review with the Court of Cassation on 26 July 1990. The request was rejected. On 6 May 1994, Dils requested a presidential pardon from François Mitterrand, who refused him. Mitterrand wrote to the victim's family and assured them that he would never grant clemency to a murderer of children.

== New facts ==
Chief Warrant Officer gendarmerie, Jean-François Abgrall, from the research section of the gendarmerie Rennes, was a specialist in cases where the serial killer Francis Heaulme was convicted, indicted or a suspect. On 24 October 1997, he sent a legal document detailing a conversation he had considered during the 1992 arrest of Heaulme in Brest. In the minutes, Abgrall wrote: "Francis Heaulme kept us the following statement, saying he had done a bike ride along a railroad track in eastern France, have been stones thrown by two children, leaving, then passing by the scene a few minutes later, when he saw the bodies of two children near cars and garbage near a bridge, seeing the scene of firefighters and police officers."

Abgrall immediately conducted research on any unsolved crimes involving two children. There was no trace of a double murder because at that time (1992), Patrick Dils had already been convicted and the double murder had been removed from the database.

In 1998, Dils' parents, who still believed their son was innocent, asked two lawyers, Parisian masters Jean-Marc Florand and Karim Achoui, to reconsider the case. Interested in Francis Heaulme, they sent a letter to the gendarmerie in Rennes. Abgrall decided to write the minutes of the legal information, and on 27 March 1998, Florand filed a new petition for review after learning that the serial killer Francis Heaulme was near the scene of the crime at the time it took place.

Court of Cassation magistrate, Jean Favard, began his investigation from a record of criminal intelligence. He visited Francis Heaulme and obtained new details about his schedule on 29 September 1986, the day of the double murder. At the time of the murder Heaulme worked in a business located 400 metres from the crime scene. He acknowledged having been on site at the day, the time and exact location of the crimes, seeing the children having stones thrown on their heads by the two children, but denied carrying out the double murder. However, his presence is a "new fact likely to raise doubts about the guilt of the condemned." The counselor rapporteur of the Committee on Revision published two reports dated 30 June 1998 and 16 July 1998.

On 21 June 1999, the board of review of criminal convictions, chaired by Henri Le Gall, found that the evidence adduced was totally unknown to the file of the Court of Assizes of minors in 1989 and can only cast doubt on Patrick Dils' guilt. He agreed to submit the file to the Dils Criminal Chamber of the Supreme Court sitting as a Court of Revision. It concluded that it should order further investigations and conduct further hearings of witnesses already heard in 1986 and 1989, but by comparing the statements of Francis Heaulme.

== Acquittal ==
On 21 April 2001, the Court of Revision quashed Dils' conviction but refused to release him pending a retrial. On 20 June 2001 a new trial opened before the juvenile Assize Court of the Marne department. Francis Heaulme appeared as a witness, but he refused to take responsibility for the double murder, despite the suspicions against him. On 29 June 2001, the court sentenced Dils to twenty-five years imprisonment, to everyone's surprise. The journalists had already prepared their articles announcing his acquittal, at the time the Advocate General had expressed his personal belief: according to him, Dils could not be the culprit, he would not have had time to commit the crime. Convicted again, Dils had ten days to appeal.

The third trial, in the juvenile Assize Court of appeal of Rhône department, opened on 8 April 2002. The law now allowed the trial to be held in public. The majority of public opinion was in favour of Dils, who appeared with a new look, without sunglasses and relaxed. Francis Heaulme was heard again, with prosecution testimony against him. Witnesses said they saw him covered in blood the day of the incident, which he confirmed himself at the bar, claiming to have fallen off his bike. For the first time, Dils spoke of the torments he endured in prison; he was beaten, mocked and raped. He returned to his very detailed confession, which was one of the only pieces of evidence pointing to Dils' guilt.

It is still unclear exactly why Dils first accused himself at the beginning of the case. Evidence was produced by the police, showing that Dils did not have time to commit the crime: the children died around 17:00, while Dils was back home until about 18:45. On 23 April 2002, the General Counsel did not charge or sentence him, the court deliberated for a few hours and Dils was acquitted on 24 April 2002. He was released from jail the same evening. The families of the victims were disappointed, convinced that the court had released a murderer.
