= Francis Heaulme =

French serial killer

- Born: Francis Heaulme; 25 February 1959 (age 67); Metz, France
- Other name: The Criminal Backpacker
- Conviction: Murder
- Penalty: Life Imprisonment

Details
- Victims: 9+

Francis Heaulme (born 25 February 1959 in Metz) is a French serial killer dubbed the "Criminal Backpacker" ("Routard du crime").

== Biography ==
Heaulme's father brutalized him until the age of 17, leading him to become an alcoholic and attempting suicide. However, he had a good relationship with his younger sister and held a boundless adoration for his mother, who died of cancer when he was 23 years old.

At the age of 20, he suddenly picked up a passion for cycling. Eight years later, he left home to travel erratically around France on foot, by hitchhiking, cycling, and via train (often without a ticket), staying in Emmaüs shelters, psychiatric institutions, and detoxification centres. He occasionally found odd jobs as a mason or metal worker, and spent his meagre earnings on drinking, sometimes mixing alcohol and tranquilizers.

As someone with untreated Klinefelter's syndrome, Heaulme was at the time incapable of committing rape by penetration with a penis. However, in at least two instances he was accompanied by other men (one a distant cousin), who violated the victims themselves while Heaulme killed them. He confessed the murders to medical personnel who did not reveal the information because of medical confidentiality. In many police stations, he did in fact recount false assaults.

He was arrested on 7 January 1992 at Bischwiller. The law enforcement agencies (police and gendarmerie) had great difficulty proving their cases because the acts were done without apparent reason or motive by a person who was highly mobile, and had alibis due to negligence. The shortcomings and poor coordination of the police organizations were also contributing factors.

Despite the lack of support from his superiors, gendarme Jean-François Abgrall quickly understood the basic rule about who he is responsible for tracking down: "It's when you ask him nothing that he says the most."

Francis Heaulme recounted murder scenes with incredible precision. For example, he showed officers how to kill a sentry by having a firm grip on the back of his head with one hand and stabbing him in the carotid artery with the other, drawing, and then retracting. According to Abgrall, "He doesn't lie. He never makes anything up. But he deliberately covers his tracks by mixing the crimes, dates and locations."

== Cases ==
The cases in which he is suspected, accused or convicted are many. There are reportedly dozens in 87 departments in France. Among them:

- The murder of 8-year-old Jorris Viville in Port-Grimaud. There is no doubt that Heaulme had an accomplice as the body had been moved more than 20 kilometres by car and he did not drive. When confronted with five possible suspects at the trial, he successively indicated each as his accomplice, before declaring he didn't want to be a "scapegoat." He alone was convicted and sentenced to life in prison.
- The murder of 49-year-old Aline Peres in Brest, for which he was sentenced to 20 years in prison. The crime occurred on a public beach in broad daylight, surrounded by people who saw nothing. This murder put gendarme Abgrall, then assigned to the Research and Intervention Brigade in Rennes, on his trail. It was this murder for which he was arrested four years later in Bischwiller.
- The murder of a retired legionnaire from Courthézon, in Vaucluse, for which he received an acquittal. Although Heaulme had confessed to Abgrall, his presence at the crime scene was never proven. Moreover, his confession seemed completely fanciful, in the light of findings made by the police on the crime scene.
- The murder of Laurence Guillaume, a 14-year-old girl, around Metz, for which he was sentenced to life in prison. For this murder, Heaulme was accompanied by the cousin of the victim, whom he had met less than an hour earlier at the fair in Metz. His accomplice was convicted of rape and complicity in the murder and sentenced to 18 years in prison.
- The murder of Laurent Bureau, a young military conscript, for which he was acquitted by the Assize Court of Dordogne. During the murder, Heaulme was accompanied by Didier Gentil, who at the time of the trial was already sentenced to life in prison for the rape and murder of a young girl named Celine in La Motte-du-Caire in 1989. The court, unable to determine which of the two murderers had actually killed Laurent Bureau, acquitted them both.
- The 29 September 1986 murder of two children, Cyril Beining and Alexander Beckrich, found dead along the railroad tracks in Montigny-lès-Metz. A man named Patrick Dils was convicted of the crime and served 15 years in prison before being exonerated in 2002.

== Convictions ==
- In May 1997, for several murders, the Assises Court of Var sentenced him to life in prison with no chance of parole for 22 years.
- On 16 December 2004, he was sentenced to an additional thirty years in prison with no chance of parole for 20 years for three murders committed in the region of the Marne in 1988 and 1989.
- On 17 May 2017, Heaulme was sentenced to life imprisonment for the murder of two boys, Cyril Beining and Alexandre Beckrich. Upon conviction, his lawyer submitted an appeal.

== Personality ==
Chief Warrant Officer Gendarmerie, Jean-François Abgrall, the Research Section of the gendarmerie in Rennes, is the specialist for cases in which Francis Heaulme was convicted, accused or suspected. He arrested Heaulme on 7 January 1992 at Bischwiller in Alsace.

Behind the face of a madman hides a manipulative and calculating mind. His morbid game consists of releasing bits of information to police to make it clear that he had "hit a snag" (French: pépin), a term he uses to describe his murders. This occurred in each new case and is evident throughout the course of his dialogues.

According to one of his successive string of lawyers, Gonzalez de Pierre Gaspard, Heaulme is not to be confronted by an authority, whether a policeman, a police officer or a judge, because he feels like they can make him say whatever they want.

== Media coverage ==
- Jean-François Abgrall wrote the book Inside the Mind of a Killer, published by Profile Books Ltd, in which he recounts his investigation of Heaulme, the so-called "Criminal Backpacker".
- The television channel TF1 introduced in March 2005 Dans la tête du tueur, a television drama with Thierry Frémont in the role of Heaulme and Bernard Giraudeau in the role of policeman Abgrall.
- The channel aired a 90-minute documentary, The Bloody Road: On the Trail of Francis Heaulme, on 13 November 2005. It was produced by Doc en Stock and directed by Laurent Guerin and Franck Doors. It traces his route.
- Abgrall recounts his investigation of Heaulme in Dance with a Serial Killer, a 70-minute BBC Storyville documentary. It was broadcast on BBC One on 24 February 2008.

== See also ==
- List of serial killers by number of victims
