= My Reincarnation =

- Poster
- Directed by: Jennifer Fox
- Produced by: Jennifer Fox
- Starring: Chogyal Namkhai Norbu; Khyentse Yeshi Namkhai
- Cinematography: Jennifer Fox
- Edited by: Sabine Krayenbühl
- Music by: Jan Tilman Schade
- Distributed by: Long Shot Factory
- Release date: October 28, 2011
- Running time: 90 minutes
- Language: English
- Box office: $96,115

My Reincarnation is a 2011 documentary film directed by Jennifer Fox. It is a drama between father and son, spanning two decades and three generations. The film addresses spirituality, cultural survival, identity, heritage, family, growing into maturity, aging, Buddhism, and past and future lives.

The film follows the Tibetan spiritual master Namkhai Norbu, who struggles to save his spiritual tradition, and his son, Khyentse Yeshi Namkhai, also known as Yeshi Silvano Namkhai (Yeshi), who stubbornly refuses to follow in the footsteps of his father. Yeshi was recognized at birth as the reincarnation of his father's uncle, a spiritual teacher who was killed by the Chinese in Tibet. But though Yeshi craves a normal life, he cannot escape his fate.

== Synopsis ==
When Namkhai Norbu Rinpoche escaped Tibet in 1959, he settled in Italy, where he married and had two children, of which Yeshi was the first. Yeshi was recognized as the reincarnation of Rinpoche's uncle, a renowned Dzogchen master, who had died after the Chinese invaded Tibet. Yeshi grew up in Italy and wanted nothing to do with this legacy. He had no interest in being a teacher like his father, nor did he want to return to Tibet and the monastery of Rinpoche's uncle to meet the students waiting for him since his birth – something that his father continually admonished him to do. Instead, he dreamed of a normal life, away from the hordes of devoted students that always surrounded his father.

Through intimate scenes Yeshi is shown growing from 18 years old to 39 years old and maturity, and his father who begins the story in his 50-year-old prime ages to 70 years and his senior years. As the story unravels, what is at stake for Namkhai Norbu Rinpoche is his spiritual tradition, for Yeshi it is his own identity. Will Yeshi's Western lifestyle replace his family tradition and his spiritual roots? Will his father succeed at transplanting the vanishing Tibetan heritage to the Western world? As time moves forward, both father and son begin to change.

The image of water and swimming, Namkhai Norbu's beloved pastime, is used as a repetitive thematic pillar through the film as a representation of his teachings of integration and emptiness. The natural sounds of chanting and song, combined with added effects and carefully scored music, is used to express a non-verbal sense of the spiritual world Norbu Rinpoche seeks to transmit to his son, and to the West.

== Production ==
Jennifer Fox spent 20 years filming My Reincarnation, from 1988 to 2009, filming in over 17 countries. The film is the result of many international associations, without which this longitudinal study could not have been completed. The Buddhist Broadcasting Foundation approached Fox about filming the story, and she received a grant from the Hartley Film Foundation for the project. My Reincarnation was a co-production between the Dutch Buddhist Broadcasting Foundation, ZDF-ARTE, Swiss TV, YLE-1 Finland and Italy, and was pre-sold to POV, the premiere documentary series on PBS in the U.S.

My Reincarnation utilizes archival film, still photographs, and over 1,000 hours of intimate scenes shot between 1988 and 2009. In addition, interviews with Namkhai Norbu and Yeshi over 20 years provide a secondary text.

== Cast ==
- Chögyal Namkhai Norbu
- Khyentse Yeshi Namkhai

== Reception ==
On review aggregator website Rotten Tomatoes, the film has a score of 73% based on reviews from 15 critics, with an average rating of 5.7/10. Basing of seven critics on Metacritic, the film has a rank of 63 out of a 100, indicating "generally favorable reviews".

Chuck Bowen of Slant Magazine wrote that "My Reincarnation, at its simplest, is another illustration of the idea that people of most walks of life have essentially the same problems". Daniel M. Gold of The New York Times praised film's prophecy: "when the family business is enlightenment, listen to your dad".

Variety's Richard Kuipers also praised "[the film's exploration of] complex relationship between exiled Tibetan spiritual master Cheogyal Namkhai Norbu Rinpoche and his Italian-born son Yeshi is [thoroughly] examined in th[is] fascinating docu[mentary]."

According to Tom Russo of The Boston Globe "The story and settings hold interest throughout, but at times the very lack of emotional connection that Yeshi laments in his father seems to hinder the film".

== See also ==
- Tulku (film)
- Unmistaken Child
