= Velorama (film) =

- Directed by: Daisy Asquith
- Produced by: Mark Atkin; Heather Croall
- Music by: Bill Nelson; Chumbawamba
- Release date: 6 July 2014
- Country: United Kingdom
- Language: English

Velorama is a documentary film celebrating a century of the bicycle, directed by Daisy Asquith.

The film was commissioned to mark the arrival of the 2014 Tour de France in Yorkshire by Tour de Cinema in conjunction with Sheffield Doc/Fest. It is made entirely from archive footage from the Yorkshire Film Archive and the BFI National Archive, and covers the invention of the bicycle and the rise of recreational cycling, through to modern competitive races such as the Tour de France. The soundtrack was created by Bill Nelson and Chumbawamba. Bill Nelson has released a CD of the soundtrack called Pedalscope.

The film premiered at the Yorkshire Festival in the run up to the Tour de France Grand Départ, and was then screened in ten outdoor locations across Yorkshire.

It was broadcast on BBC Four on Sunday 6 July 2014.
