= Bothaina Kamel =

Egyptian democracy activist

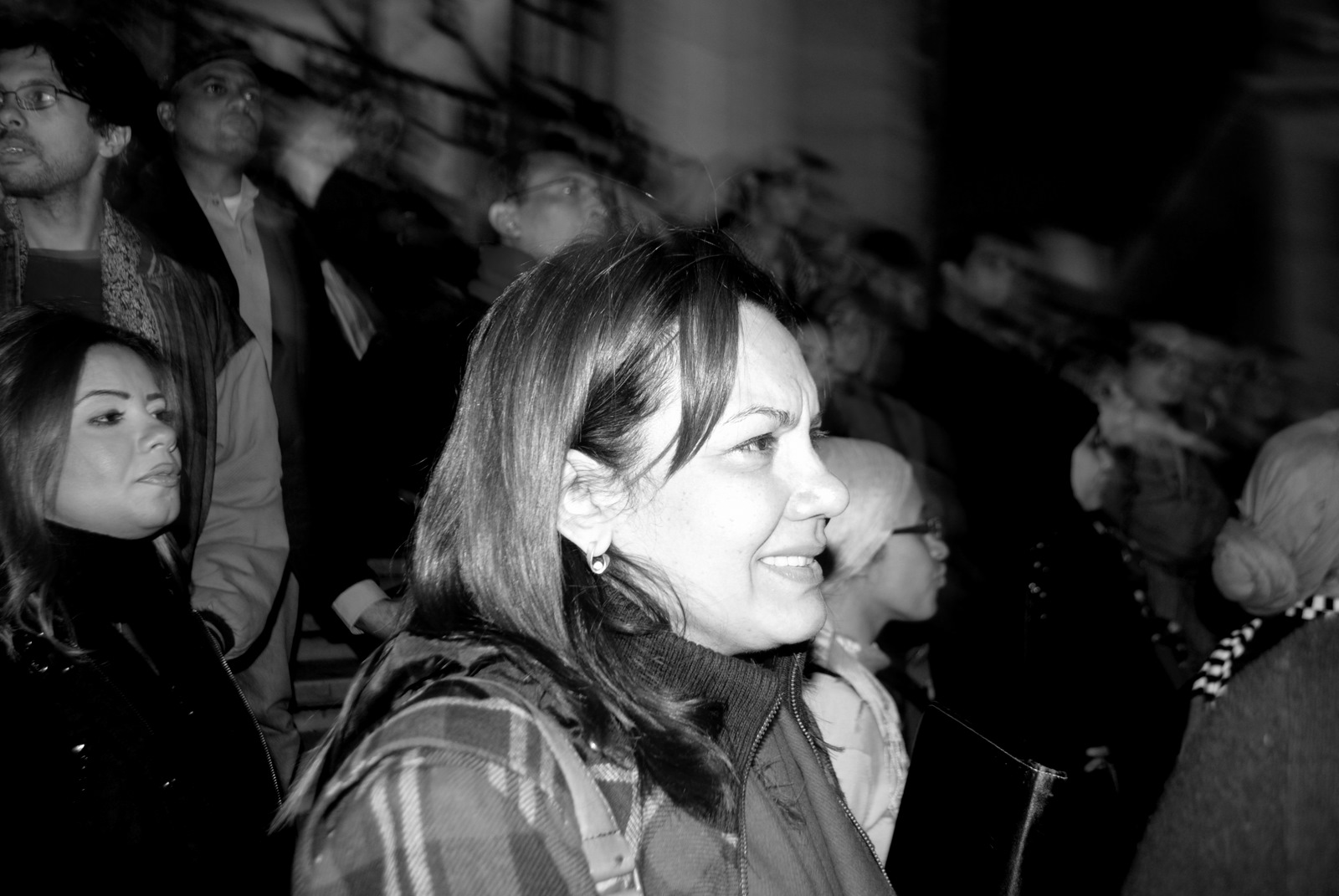
- Born: 18 April 1962 (age 64); Cairo, Egypt
- Education: Cairo University
- Known for: Political activist Presenter
- Political party: Independent; Constitution Party

Bothaina Kamel (Egyptian Arabic: بثينة كامل; born 18 April 1962, in Cairo) is an Egyptian television anchor, activist, and politician. A long-time pro-democracy advocate, particularly in Shayfeencom, her professional career has been marked by repeated conflict with authorities. In June 2011 she announced her candidacy for the Egyptian presidency, although she did not receive enough signatures to make the ballot. She announced on 12 April 2014 that she would run in the 2014 presidential election though she was unable to collect enough endorsements to run.

Kamel hosted an Egyptian radio program called Nighttime Confessions from 1992 to 1998. She later worked as a new presenter for Egyptian state television, and hosted a show called Please Understand Me on the Saudi Arabian-owned Orbit satellite TV network. In each assignment, she eventually encountered official resistance: Confessions was cancelled after outcries by religious conservatives; she took a leave of absence from Egyptian state television rather than participate in propaganda surrounding the 2005 elections; and Understand Me was taken off the air by the Saudi producers when they became concerned that its coverage of the 2011 Egyptian revolution would implicate Saudi interests.

She has long been active in pro-democracy activities, often present a pro-democracy rallies, forming the election monitoring group Shayfeencom, in 2005, and immediately taking to the streets during the 2011 revolution.

She is a self-described social democrat, and ran as an independent. A Sunni Muslim, she has taken anti-sectarian stances, endorsing proposals for equal treatment of Coptic and Muslim places of worship and for trying those who incite sectarian violence. Additionally, she wears a Muslim crescent and a Christian cross necklace both are symbols of Egyptian unity and also were the symbol of the 1919 Egyptian Revolution. She criticized the military, rather than either sect, for sectarian clashes that have erupted in the wake of the revolution. Other positions include reducing the minimum age of parliamentarians from 30 to 22 in view of the youth participation in the revolution.
