= Flying: Confessions of a Free Woman =

- Directed by: Jennifer Fox
- Release date: November 22, 2006
- Running time: 353 minutes
- Country: United States
- Language: English

Flying: Confessions of a Free Woman is a 2006 documentary film by Jennifer Fox. In six one-hour episodes, Fox travels across countries with her camera recording numerous candid conversations, mostly with women. Its autobiographical dramatic narrative acts as a starting point to introduce reflections on various social and political issues of a modern female life, including marriage, reproductive rights, divorce, childbirth, sexual abuse, and female genital mutilation. The film is notable for its conversational "Pass the Camera" filming technique and is an example of cinéma vérité.

== Theatrical Release and Critical Reception ==
Flying premiered at the International Documentary Film Festival in Amsterdam (IDFA) on November 22, 2006, and domestically at the Sundance Film Festival on January 18, 2007; in both cases, it appeared as a Special Event. Following Sundance, Flying appeared at festivals in Croatia, Sweden, Greece, Israel, Canada, England, Italy, and France. Its US theatrical debut occurred July 4, 2007 at the Film Forum in New York City, and then embarked on a US theatrical tour, appearing in Chicago, Santa Monica, Hollywood, Minneapolis, San Francisco, Austin, Boston, and other cities.

Flying was well received by critics on merit of both theme and form. In The New York Times, reviewer Jeanette Catsoulis described it as "an addictive soap about sexuality and sisterhood." The New York Times had previously done a feature story on Flying in which John Anderson called it:

An eclectic mix of film languages, including verite, self-shooting, diaries, narration, and what Ms. Fox calls 'passing the camera,' in which her subjects shoot one another as well as her. A personal memoir, feminist manifesto and examination of Global Woman! Ms. Fox seems intent on reflecting something altogether outside movies. Or even nonfiction. Balzac perhaps. Or George Eliot.

The film was endorsed by Sex and the City creator Candace Bushnell, who said it "should be required viewing for all women."

== Television ==
Flying was broadcast on multiple television channels: TV 2 in Denmark (currently airing on DR); SBS in Australia; SVT in Sweden, YLE in Finland; Ikon/Humanistische in The Netherlands; BBC in the United Kingdom; and Sundance Channel in the US. Most of the funding for the film came from television; a large part came from HBO, which did not end up airing the film.

== DVD release ==
The six-hour DVD of Flying: Confessions of a Free Woman was released in October 2007.
