= Shayfeencom =

Egyptian political organization

Shayfeencom شايفنكم
- الجمعية المصرية للرقابة الشعبية و حقوق الإنسان
- Founded: 2005
- Founder: Bothaina Kamel; Engi El-Haddad; Ghada Shahbandar
- Type: Political group; Pressure group
- Purpose: Anti-corruption; Free and fair election
- Region served: Egypt
- Method: Advocacy evaluation; Awareness campaigns; Demonstrations; Nonviolent protest; Occupations; Online activism; Sit-ins; Social media
- Volunteers: Thousands
- Website: shayfeencom.org
- Re-established in 2011

Shayfeencom (Egyptian Arabic: We see you) is an initiative that started with three Egyptian women (a prominent TV newscaster, a university professor, and a marketing consultant) to help bring political reform and democracy to Egypt.

The movement aims to end corruption in both governmental and non-governmental institutions through public monitoring of elections, whilst increasing awareness of the principles of democracy.

The non-profit was established in 2005 by a group of non-politically oriented individuals, and started its first monitoring and observation experience in Egypt's first multi-candidate presidential elections. Within the first month of launching the initiative, 5,000 people volunteered and joined online, and over 1,000 volunteers actively participated in monitoring elections. Today, the movement includes over 10 founding members, and thousands of regular members.

== Goals ==
Shayfeencom has three primary goals: to end corruption in all public and private institutions through public monitoring, to enable the citizens as key fighters against corruption, and to attain electoral and judicial reform.

The main focuses are on:

- Corporate corruption
- Electoral fraud
- Government corruption
- Judicial corruption
- Kleptocracy
- Police corruption

== Methods ==
Shayfeencom's reporting system

Shayfeencom uses its large membership database, all types of social media, and a hotline to receive reports of corruption in the country; it then files a case against the specified party. If the party does not respond, Shayfeencom uses the media to expose what has occurred; they might also carry out sit-ins and other demonstrations.

In 2007, documentary film director Jehane Noujaim (with Sherief El Katsha) broadcast the film Shayfeen.com, which was a part of the Why Democracy? project.

== Members ==
Originally, the movement was founded by three women. It was ended by the Mubarak regime, but after the ousting of Mubarak in 2011, Shayfeencom was re-established by new members.

Shayfeencom's membership is in the tens of thousands, but due to fear of political persecution, they have been discreet when pursuing official figures and have created a privacy policy which does not allow them to share other members' names.

== History ==
=== Pre-Arab Spring ===
Shayfeencom began in 2005, after President Hosni Mubarak announced that for the first time in 24 years, elections would allow for multiparty participation; this sparked demonstrations by Egyptians who denounced this move as a sham. When the government responded with a violent crackdown, Bothaina Kamel, Ghada Shahbandar, and Engi El-Haddad formed Shayfeencom.

For the 2005 elections, Shayfeencom armed supporters with video cameras and sent them to polling stations around the country to monitor the elections and document the political process. Supporters witnessed electoral fraud and voter intimidation. When Muslim Brotherhood candidates made a good showing in the first round of voting, security forces barred voters from entering the polls for the second round. By the third round, voters' frustrations incited violent clashes between protesters and police.

Shayfeencom Sit-in for the resignation of the Attorney General Abdel Meguid Mahmoud

Although discouraged by a voter turnout of only 30%, the Shayfeencom leaders were heartened by the willingness of two judges to investigate election fraud carried out by eighteen of their colleagues. The judges found evidence of fraud, and Shayfeencom began rallying support for an independent judiciary. In spite of the prohibition against assemblies of more than five people, crowds gathered outside the Egyptian Judges' Club to show their support. Many in the crowd were arrested and beaten, including Judge Mahmoud Hamza. The three founders of Shayfeencom produced a short film, aired on BBC, about the plight of the judiciary. They encouraged the public to use all the technology at their disposal—radio, plasma screens, and the Internet—to support the May 25, 2006 "Judges' March for an Independent Judiciary".

The march and demonstration resulted in the arrests of thousands of civilians, who remained in prison for months. Though faced by a lack of money and failure to achieve earlier objectives, Shayfeencom continued its work. Co-founder Engi El-Haddad spoke to a group of world leaders (including former president George W. Bush) at the UN, describing the lack of political freedom in Egypt. In spring of 2007, Shayfeencom mounted a campaign against the government's proposed 34 constitutional amendments that would write parts of the Emergency Law into the Constitution.

=== Post-Arab Spring ===
Following the 2011 Egyptian revolution, Shayfeencom was re-established, with dramatically changed methods. They began preparing for the first Egyptian presidential elections months before it was announced, collecting thousands of volunteers from across Egypt and training them through YouTube videos and online seminars.

Members of the public watched for electoral irregularities and called a hotline to report them. Reports also came in through Twitter and Facebook. Alleged violations would immediately appear on Shayfeencom's website; a few minutes later, official monitors would either confirm or deny the reports. Two days into the first phase of Egypt's presidential elections, Shayfeencom received reports of over 1,000 violations throughout the country.

Shayfeencom remains as a watchdog, anti-corruption movement.

==== Port Said ====
Shayfeencom opened its first board of trustees in Port Said following the Port Said Stadium riot in April 2013.
