= Lalit Vachani =

Indian documentary filmmaker

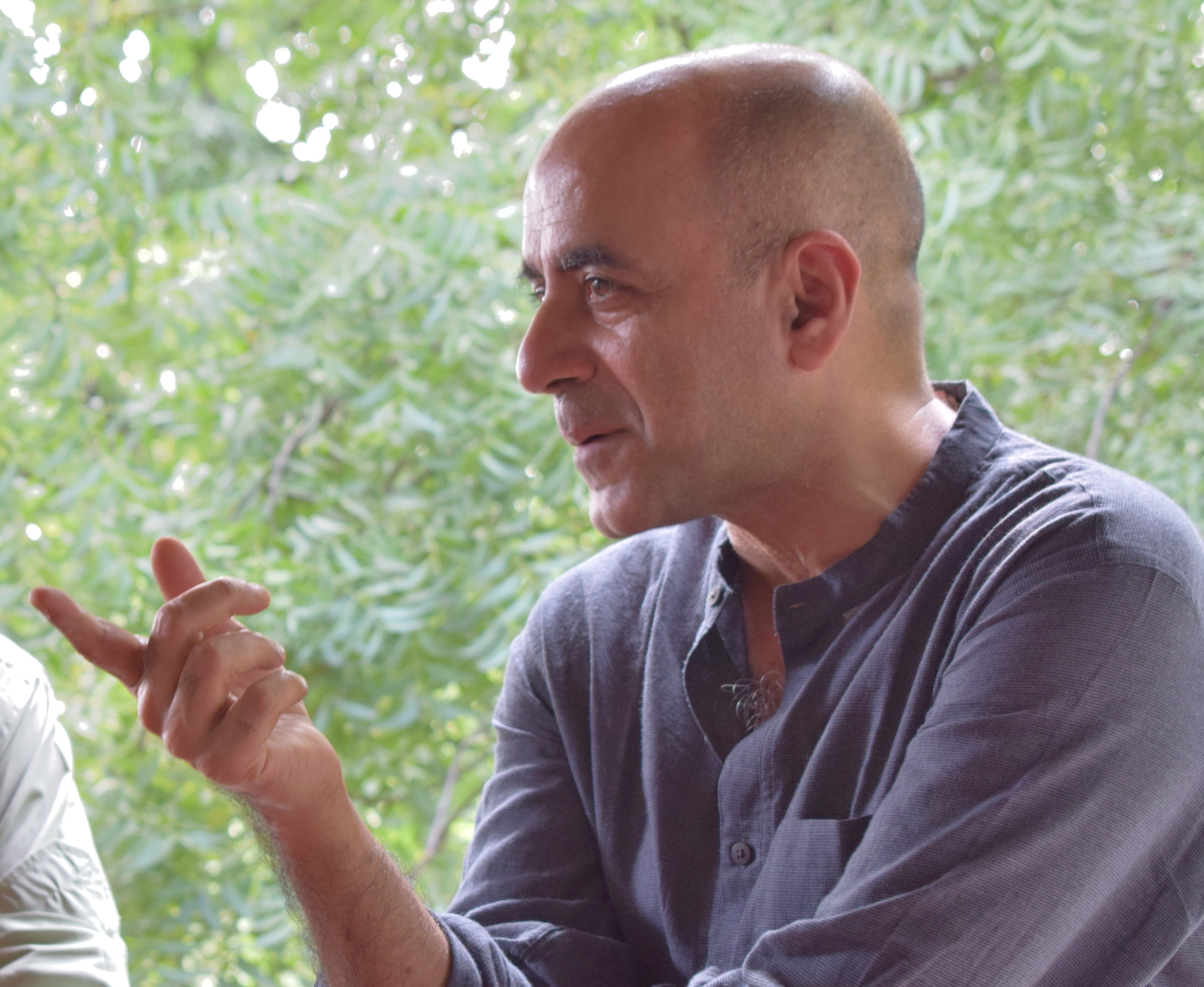
- Occupation: Filmmaker
- Website: IMDb

Lalit Vachani is an Indian documentary filmmaker.

== Life ==
Vachani studied at the St. Stephen's College, Delhi University and the Annenberg School for Communication at the University of Pennsylvania.

He was a visiting lecturer at the Mass Communication Research Centre in Delhi from 1990 to 1998. He also taught courses on film production at the University of Massachusetts, Amherst and the Amherst College. He has been a visiting scholar at the Center for Media, Culture and History at the New York University in 1999, and a research fellow at the Max Planck Institute and the Lichtenberg-Kolleg in 2011–12.

Vachani's films have received support from the Soros/Sundance Documentary Foundation, the Jan Vrijman Fund and the India Foundation for the Arts.

== Works ==
- Recasting Selves (2019, 80 minutes).
- An Ordinary Election (2015, 125 minutes).
- Tales from Napa (2010, 26 minutes).
- The Salt Stories (2008, 84 minutes), Winner of the Best documentary film, MIAAC 2009 and the 2nd prize in Film South Asia Kathmandu, 2009.
- In Search of Gandhi (2007, 52 minutes), Winner of the EBU Special Golden Link award, 2008.
- Rebuilding with Richie (2006, 27 minutes)
- Natak Jari Hai (The Play Goes on, 2005, 83min.).
- The Chhara Projects (2003, 63 minutes).
- The Men in the Tree (2002, 98 minutes).
- The Starmaker (1997, 74 minutes)
- The Academy (1995, 52 minutes).
- The Boy in the Branch (1993, 27 minutes), produced for the Channel 4 television, U. K.

== Bibliography ==
- Kumar, Amitava (2004). Husband of a Fanatic. Penguin Books India. ISBN 0143031899.
- Nussbaum, Martha Craven (2008). The Clash Within: Democracy, Religious Violence, and India's Future. Harvard University Press. ISBN 978-0-674-03059-6.
