= From the Sea to the Land Beyond =

From The Sea to the Land Beyond: Britain's Coast on Film
- Directed by: Penny Woolcock
- Produced by: Crossover - Heather Croall and Mark Atkin; Sheffield Doc/Fest
- Music by: Sea Power
- Release date: 13 June 2012 (United Kingdom)
- Country: United Kingdom
- Language: English

From The Sea to the Land Beyond: Britain's Coast on Film is a 2012 documentary feature film directed by Penny Woolcock, with an original soundtrack by British indie-rock band Sea Power. The project was produced by Heather Croall and Mark Atkin of Crossover to premiere at the Sheffield Doc/Fest as part of The Space project from the BBC and the Arts Council England. The film was edited by Alex Fry.

The world premiere was at the Crucible Theatre at Sheffield Doc/Fest in June 2012, with Sea Power playing the soundtrack live. It has since been performed at the BFI Southbank, Latitude Festival, Sundance London, at Doc/Fest 2013, and under the hull of the Cutty Sark. The film with recorded soundtrack was shown on BBC Four's Storyville on 18 November 2012, and released on DVD on 21 January 2013. The soundtrack album was released on 2 December 2013.

== Film ==
The film explores a century of life on Britain's coastline, using a mixture of black and white and colour footage from the BFI National Archive stretching back to the earliest days of movie making. It explores social history, life in wartime and peacetime, women's history and the rise and fall of fishing and shipbuilding.

The earliest footage is taken from Blackpool at the start of the 20th century. There's a carnival procession with floral floats and a placard about the suffragettes. A swimming race takes place with everyone dressed in evening wear complete with top hats, watched by boats of spectators, also in fine attire. Women are shown repairing nets and gutting, salting and packing herring. They also dangle off the sides of cliffs to collect eggs.

The film includes early footage from the Mitchell and Kenyon film company; early Peter Greenaway; and footage from Marion Grierson, the sister of British 'docfather' John Grierson. Wartime footage shows RMS Mauretania, troops practising trench manoeuvres, synchronised marching battalions and women priming and loading bombs. In more peaceful times, families enjoy the simple pleasures of the seaside, with palmistry and phrenology available on the beach. Up-to-date footage of the British at play includes a wind and rain-lashed Blackpool with holidaymakers battling the elements. RNLI lifeboat and helicopter rescues are shown, highlighting the bravery of those involved. The life of the docks is explored, from bustling workplaces to the redevelopment of the London Docklands.

Before its debut Woolcock said it was the only film she'd made that was "unstressful to watch" and called it "a beautiful and poetic experience". From the Sea to the Land Beyond was produced by Mark Atkin for Crossover and Heather Croall for Doc/Fest.

Doc/Fest’s archive and music offering last year From The Sea To The Land Beyond was addictive, and performed well for Storyville on BBC Four.

— Nick Fraser, Series Editor, Storyville,

From the Sea to the Land Beyond

Studio album by Sea Power
- Released: 2 December 2013
- Genre: Soundtrack
- Length: 74:05
- Label: Rough Trade Records

Sea Power chronology
Machineries of Joy (2013)	From the Sea to the Land Beyond (2013)	Sea of Brass (2015)

Professional ratings
Aggregate scores
Source	Rating
Metacritic	86/100
Review scores
Source	Rating
AllMusic	4/5 stars
Drowned in Sound	9/10
The Line of Best Fit	8.5/10
Mojo	4/5 stars
The Observer	4/5 stars
Q	4/5 stars
Record Collector	5/5 stars

== Soundtrack ==
The soundtrack was released as a studio album titled From the Sea to the Land Beyond under Rough Trade Records on 2 December 2013. Sea Power were commissioned to write and perform the soundtrack because of their love of nature and wildlife. The soundtrack was composed at Lympne Castle in Kent and recorded at Brighton Electric studios.

As the film begins, plaintive keyboard chords are joined by trumpet, cello and a crescendo of drums and cymbals. The music ebbs and flows with the elements depicted in the film.

The music is made up of reworked moments from the band's back catalogue, for example elements of the tracks "Carrion", "No Lucifer" and "The Great Skua", along with specially written material.

The title of the film and the soundtrack is drawn from the song "The Land Beyond" from the album Open Season.

=== Track listing ===
No.	Title	Length
1.	"From the Sea to the Land Beyond"	5:00
2.	"Remarkable Diving Feat"	4:18
3.	"Strange Sports"	3:15
4.	"Heroines of the Cliff"	4:52
5.	"The Guillemot Girls"	3:05
6.	"Suffragette Riots"	3:57
7.	"Heatwave"	3:44
8.	"Melancholy of the Boot"	4:22
9.	"Be You Mighty Sparrow"	2:13
10.	"Berth 24"	4:04
11.	"Red Rock Riviera"	6:53
12.	"Coastguard"	4:22
13.	"Perspectives of Stinky Turner"	4:54
14.	"Bonjour Copains"	2:58
15.	"The Wild Highlands"	3:10
16.	"Docklands Renewed"	5:41
17.	"The Islanders"	3:07
18.	"Heatwave (Lympne Castle Demo)"	3:45

== Interactivity ==
The film was launched with an interactive website, landbeyond.co.uk, allowing users to create a personalised video postcard. The website won the FOCAL International Award for Best Use of Footage on Digital or non-Television Platforms.
