= List of America ReFramed episodes =

The following is a list of episodes from World Channel series America ReFramed, a production of American Documentary, Inc.. Since 2012, America ReFramed has broadcast over 120 films by independent filmmakers.

== Season 1 ==
#	Film title	Premiere	Director
1	Chisholm '72	9 September 2012	Shola Lynch
2	Street Fight	16 September 2012	Marshall Curry
3	La Americana	9/23/12	Nicholas Bruckman, John Mattiuzzi
4	Push: Madison	30 September 2012	Rudy Hypolite
5	Passionate Politics	7 October 2012	Tami Gold
6	Trust	14 October 2012	Nancy Kelly, Kenji Yamamoto
7	Skydancer	21 October 2012	Katja Esson
8	My Louisiana Love	11 November 2012	Sharon Linezo Hong
9	Meat Hooked	18 November 2012	Suzanne Wasserman
10	abUsed: The Postville Raid	2 December 2012	Luis Argueta
11	Red Without Blue	9 December 2012	Brooke Sebold, Benita Sills, Todd Sills
12	90 Miles	16 December 2012	Juan Carlos Zaldivar
13	All Me: The Life and Times of Winfred Rembert	23 December 2012	Vivian Ducat
14	American Dreams Deferred	30 December 2012	William Caballero
15	Beyond Belief	6 January 2013	Beth Murphy
16	Trembling Before G_d	13 January 2013	Sandi DuBowski
17	New Muslim Cool	20 January 2013	Jennifer Maytorena Taylor
18	Brother Outsider	3 February 2013	Bennett Singer, Nancy Kates
19	After Happily Ever After	10 February 2013	Kate Schermerhorn
20	51 Birch Street	17 February 2013	Doug Block
21	Flying: Confessions (Part 1)	17 March 2013	Jennifer Fox
22	Flying: Confessions (Part 2)	24 March 2013	Jennifer Fox
23	Na Kamalei: Men of Hula	31 March 2013	Lisette Marie Flanary
24	West 47th Street	7 April 2013	Bill Lichtenstein, June Peoples
25	Big Enough	14 April 2013	Jan Krawitz
26	Follow The Leader	30 June 2013	Jonathan Goodman Levitt

== Season 2 ==
#	Film title	Premiere	Director
1	Building Babel	10 September 2013	David Osit
2	Radio Unnameable	17 September 2013	Paul Lovlace, Jessica Wolfson
3	The Medicine Game	24 September 2013	Lukas Korver
4	The New Public	1 October 2013	Jyllian Gunther
5	Code of the West	8 October 2013	Rebecca Richman Cohen
6	Plagues and Pleasures on the Salton Sea	15 October 2013	Chris Metzler, Jeff Springer
7	The Way We Get By	12 November 2013	Aron Gaudet
8a	My Brooklyn	14 January 2014	Kelly Anderson
8b	Fate of a Salesman	14 January 2014	Ben Crosbie, Tessa Moran
9	Downeast	21 January 2014	David Redmon, Ashley Sabin
10	The Pruitt-Igoe Myth	28 January 2014	Chad Freidrichs
11	The Prep School Negro	11 February 2014	André Robert Lee
12	Drivers Wanted	25 February 2014	Joshua Z. Weinstein
13	Lulu Sessions	4 March 2014	S. Casper Wong
14	Mothers of Bedford	18 March 2014	Jenifer McShane
15	Town Hall on Tea Party movement	1 April 2014	Sierra Pettengill, Jamila Wignot
16	Deputized	15 April 2014	Susan Hagedorn, Amanda Zinoman
17	Come Hell or High Water: Battle for Turkey Creek	29 April 2014	Leah Mahan
18	Rachel Is	8 April 2014	Charlotte Glynn
19	Dignity Harbor	22 April 2014	Mike Gualdoni, Zach White
20	Reserved To Fight	27 May 2014	Chantelle Squires
21	Broken Heart Land	10 June 2014	Jeremy Stulberg, Randy Stulberg

== Season 3 ==
#	Film title	Premiere	Director
1	Purgatorio	6 January 2015	Rodrigo Reyes
2	Trash Dance	13 January 2015	Andrew Garrison
3	American Heart	20 January 2015	Chris Newberry
4	Gaucho Del Norte	27 January 2015	Sofian Khan, Andrés Caballero
5	Our Mockingbird	3 February 2015	Sandy Jaffe
6	The Hill	10 February 2015	Lisa Molomot
7	Shell Shocked	17 February 2015	John Richie
8	A Will for the Woods	24 February 2015	Amy Browne, Jeremy Kaplan, Tony Hale, Brian Wilson
9	Out in the Silence	3 March 2015	Joe Wilson, Dean Hamer
10	Looks Like Laury, Sounds Like Laury	10 March 2015	Pamela Hogan
11	Stable Life	17 March 2015	Sara MacPherson
12	Learning to Swallow	24 March 2015	Danielle Beverly
13	Yellow Fever	31 March 2015	Sophie Rousmaniere
14	Family Affair	7 April 2015	Chico Colvard
15	The Perfect Victim	14 April 2015	Elizabeth Rohrbaugh
16	Hanna Ranch	21 April 2015	Mitch Dickman
17	Perfect Strangers	28 April 2015	Jan Krawitz
18	9-Man	5 May 2015	Ursula Liang
19	Winning Girl	12 May 2015	Kimberlee Bassford
20	Cambodian Son	19 May 2015	Masahiro Sugano
21	Endless Abilities	26 May 2015	Harvey Burrell, and Tripp Clemens
22	If You Build It	2 June 2015	Patrick Creadon
23	Where God Likes to Be	9 June 2015	Nicolas Hudak, Anna Hudak
24	By the River of Babylon	16 June 2015	Don Howard
25	A Self-Made Man	23 June 2015	Lori Petchers
26	Before You Know It	30 June 2015	PJ Raval

== Season 4 ==
#	Film title	Premiere	Director
1	Old South	2 February 2016	Danielle Beverly
2	American Arab	9 February 2016	Usama Alshaibi
3	The Mosque in Morgantown	16 February 2016	Brittany Huckabee
4	Adama	23 February 2016	David Felix Sutcliffe
5	Revolution '67	1 March 2016	Marylou Tibaldo-Bongiorno
6	BaddDDD Sonia Sanchez	8 March 2016	Sabrina Schmidt Gordon, Barbara Attie, Janet Goldwater
7	Divide in Concord	15 March 2016	Kris Kaczor, Dave Regos
8	Romeo Romeo	22 March 2016	Lizzie Gottlieb
9	Dog Days	29 March 2016	Laura Waters Hinson, Kasey Kirby
10	Children of the Arctic	5 April 2016	Nick Brandestini
11	Reversing the Mississippi	12 April 2016	Ian Midgley
12	City of Trees	19 April 2016	Brandon Kramer
13	In An Ideal World	26 April 2016	Noel Schwerin
14	The Grace Lee Project	10 May 2016	Grace Lee
15	Operation Popcorn	17 May 2016	David Grabias
16	My Life in China	24 May 2016	Kenneth Eng
17	The Last Season	31 May 2016	Sara Dosa
18	College Week	7 June 2016	Derek Grace
19	The Hand That Feeds	21 June 2016	Rachel Lears, Robin Blotnick
20	Buried Above Ground	28 June 2016	Ben Selkow
21	America ReFramed: Class Of 27	13 September 2016	James Rutenbeck
21a	Class of '27	13 September 2016	James Rutenbeck
21b	Little Dream Catchers	13 September 2016	Dustinn Craig
21c	Fields of Promise	13 September 2016	Nina Alvarez
22	In The Game	27 September 2016	Maria Finitzo
23	We Like It Like That	4 October 2016	Mathew Ramirez Warren
24	Kivalina	1 November 2016	Gina Abatemarco
25	By Blood	15 November 2016	Marcos C. Barbery & Sam Russell

== Season 5 ==
#	Film title	Premiere	Director
1	A New Color: The Art of Being Edythe Boone	14 February 2017	Malene "Mo" Morris
2	70 Acres in Chicago: Cabrini Green	21 February 2017	Ronit Bezalel
3	Radical Grace	14 March 2017	Rebecca Parrish
4	Enter the Faun	28 March 2017	Tamar Rogoff, Daisy Wright
5	Good Luck Soup	9 May 2017	Matthew Hashiguchi
6	Unbroken Glass	16 May 2017	Dinesh Das Sabu
7	Breathin': The Eddy Zheng Story	23 May 2017	Ben Wang
8	Vegas Baby	27 June 2017	Amanda Micheli
9	Oxyana	11 July 2017	Sean Dunne
10	Care	5 September 2017	Deirdre Fishel
11	Night School	12 September 2017	Andrew Cohn
12	We Breathe Again	26 September 2017	Marsh Chamberlain
13	Farewell Ferris Wheel	10 October 2017	Jamie Sisley, Miguel 'M.i.G.' Martinez
14	Deej	17 October 2017	Robert Rooy
15	On A Knife Edge	7 November 2017	Jeremy Williams

== Season 6 ==
#	Film title	Premiere	Director
1	Gentlemen of Vision	6 February 2018	Jim Kirchherr, Frank Popper
2	For Akheem	13 February 2018	Landon Van Soest, Jeremy S. Levine
3	Agents of Change	20 February 2018	Abby Ginzberg, Frank Dawson
4	100 Years: One Woman's Fight for Justice	13 March 2018	Melinda Janko
5	The Invisible Patients	20 March 2018	Patrick O'Connor
6	MILWAUKEE 53206	3 April 2018	Keith McQuirter
7	Beyond the Wall	10 April 2018	Jenny Phillips, Bestor Cram
8	The Corridor	17 April 2018	Annelise Wunderlich, Richard O’Connell
9	Through the Repellent Fence	24 April 2018	Sam Wainwright Douglas
10	Finding Kukan	8 May 2018	Robin Lung
11	Random Acts of Legacy	15 May 2018	Ali Kazimi
12	Who is Arthur Chu?	22 May 2018	Scott Drucker, Yu Gu
13	Bidder 70		Beth Gage, George Gage
14	Personal Statement		Julianne Dressner, Edwin Martinez
15	Charlie vs. Goliath		Reed Lindsay
16	Island Soldier	14 November 2018	Nathan Fitch
17	Moroni for President		Saala Huusko, Jasper Rischen
18	There Are Jews Here		Brad Lichtenstein, Morgan Elise Johnson
19	Winter at Westbeth		Rohan Spong

== Season 7 ==
#	Film title	Premiere	Director
1	Saving Brinton	1 January 2019	Andrew Sherburne, Tommy Haines
2	Pyne Poynt	22 January 2019	Steve Patrick Ercolani, Gabe Dinsmoor, Dan Fipphen
3	Detroit 48202: Conversations Along a Postal Route	29 January 2019	Pam Sporn
4	Struggle & Hope	19 February 2019	Kari Barber
5	Late Blossom Blues	26 February 2019	Wolfgang Pfoser-Almer (as Wolfgang Almer), Stefan Wolner
6	Exit Music	16 April 2019	Cameron Mullenneaux
7	Death of a Child	30 April 2019	Frida Barkfors, Lasse Barkfors
8	Nailed It	7 May 2019	Adele Pham
9	Circle Up	14 May 2019	Julie Mallozzi
10	Councilwoman	3 September 2019	Margo Guernsey
11	The Unafraid	1 October 2019	Anayansi Prado and Heather Courtney
12	Intelligent Lives	22 October 2019	Dan Habib
13	Perfectly Normal For Me	29 October 2019	Catherine Tambini
14	Surviving Home	11 November 2019	Jillian Moul and Matthew Moul

== Season 9 ==
#	Film title	Premiere	Director
1	Far East Deep South	4 May 2021	Larissa Lam

== Season 11 ==
#	Film title	Premiere	Director
1	Big Chief, Black Hawk	16 February 2023	Jonathan Isaac Jackson
