= Television documentary =

Genre of television program

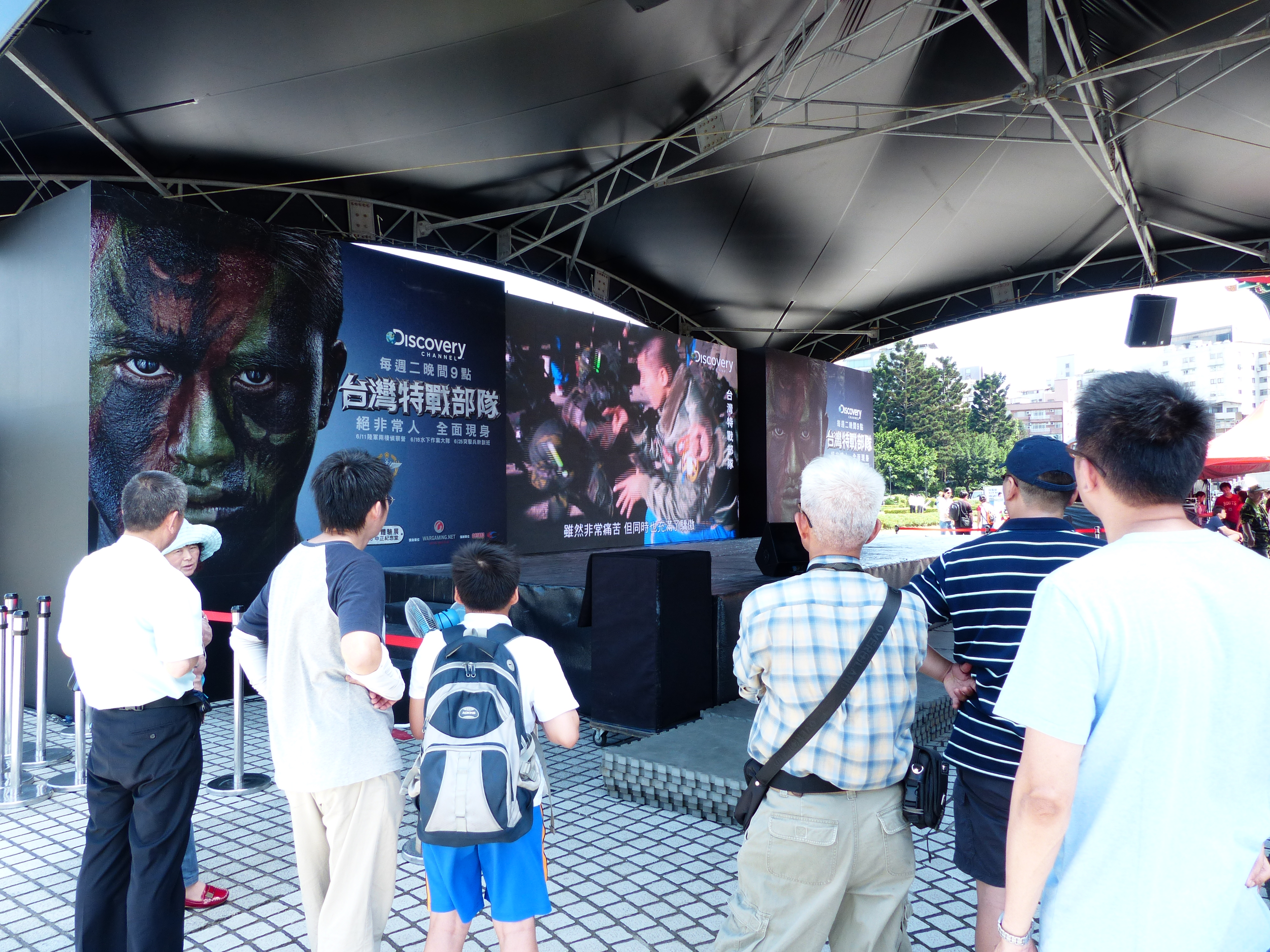
People in Taiwan watching the Discovery Channel documentary Taiwan's Military Elite

Television documentaries are televised media productions that screen documentaries. Television documentaries exist either as a television documentary series or as a television documentary film.

- Television documentary series, sometimes called docuseries, are television series screened within an ordered collection of two or more televised episodes.
- Television documentary films exist as a singular documentary film to be broadcast via a documentary channel or a news-related channel. Occasionally, documentary films that were initially intended for televised broadcasting may be screened in a cinema.

Documentary television rose to prominence during the 1940s, spawning from earlier cinematic documentary filmmaking ventures. Early production techniques were highly inefficient compared to modern recording methods. Early television documentaries typically featured historical, wartime, investigative or event-related subject matter. Contemporary television documentaries have extended to include celebrity, sporting, travel, economic and wildlife subjects.

Many television documentaries have created controversy and debate surrounding ethical, cultural, social and political concerns. Controversy has also arisen regarding the current formatting of televised documentary series, as well as the contextualisation of televised documentaries broadcast via contemporary streaming services.

== History ==
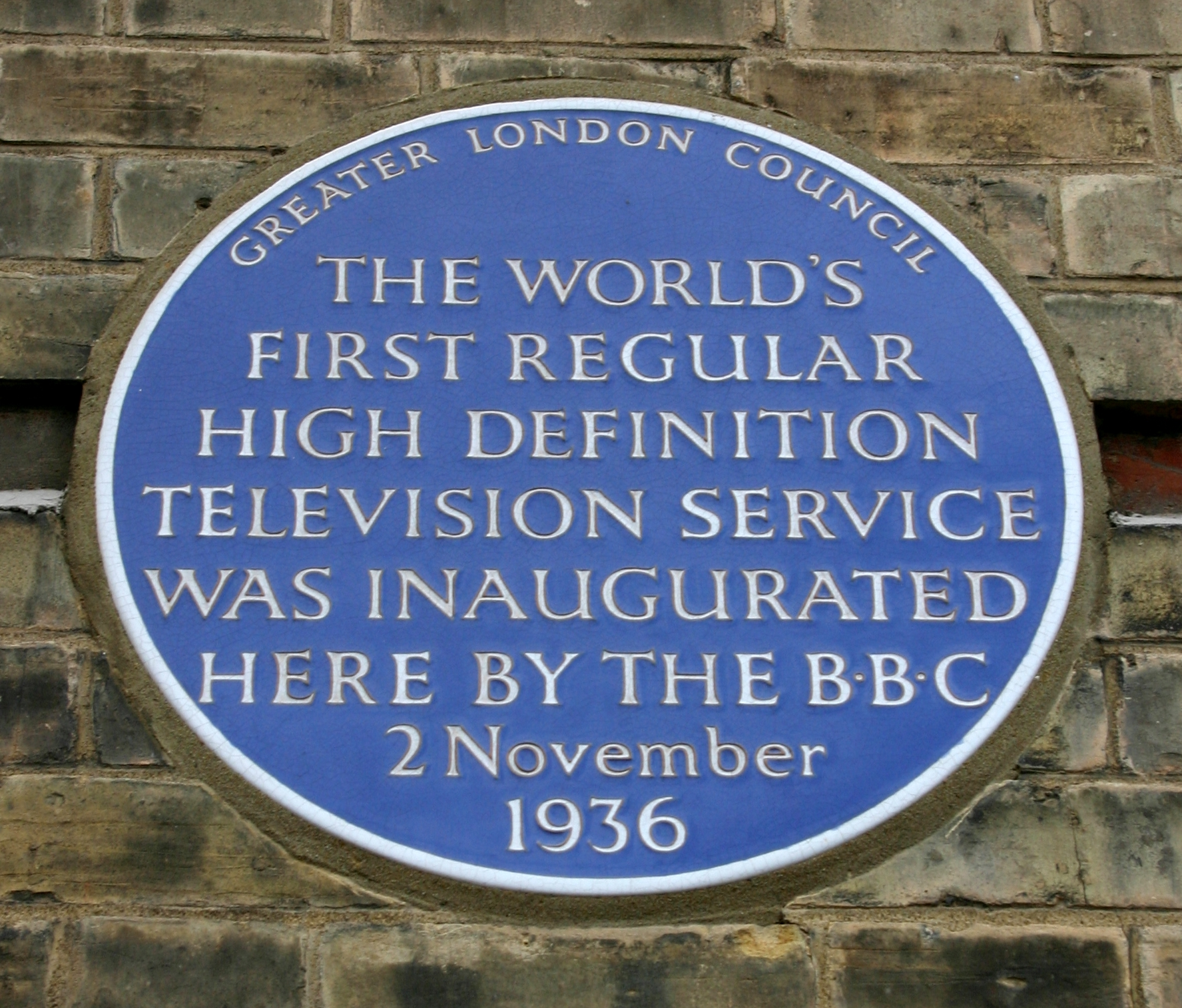
Commemorative plaque of the BBC's high-definition public television service.

=== Pre-1900 ===
Televised documentary finds its roots in the media communication modes of film, photojournalism and radio. Specifically, televised documentary can be traced to the origins of cinematic documentary film. Documentary film emerged in prominence within non-fiction filmmaking as an account of historical and contemporary events. In 1898, Bolesław Matuszewski, a Polish cinematographer suggested documentary film to be a "new source of history". The widespread evolution of documentary filmmaking led James Chapman to consider its origins as a largely "international process" involving nations such as the United States of America, France, Germany, the Soviet Union and Great Britain.

=== 1900–1950 ===
The emergence of documentary film within its televised format followed the advent of the launch of the world's first high-definition (as then defined) public television service on 2 November 1936 by the British Broadcasting Corporation (BBC). Following this initial broadcast, the BBC's television service continued, albeit in limited capacity, until 1939 with the onset of the Second World War. This suspension lasted throughout the six-year wartime period. Regular television broadcasting was resumed in 1946. Subsequent expansion of the BBC's network throughout the coming years toward nationwide coverage, additional channels, as well as the introduction of novel competition into the television network market (notably Independent Television) spurred opportunities for the emergence of televised documentary. In line with the British conception of a publicly televised broadcasting network, television documentary also finds its origins in British media.

It is of common belief that the widespread televised revolution, particularly within documentary filmmaking, was an inevitable construct. Duncan Ross and Ramsay Short became early pioneers of the televised documentary format, prominently embedding existing filmmaking techniques within this new broadcasting vehicle. Ross, in 1950, noted that documentary media was "perfectly at home in television." At this time, Ross and his contemporaries considered television documentary as an extension beyond traditional documentary filmmaking – particularly in celebrating John Grierson's defining notion that documentary exists as "the creative treatment of actuality." These early television documentarists advocated for the potential influence of television documentary within educational, social and cultural mediums.

=== 1950–1970 ===
The origin of television documentary within the United States dates to 1949, depicting a series of wartime memoirs. During the 1950s, prominent commercial broadcasting networks, such as NBC, ABC and CBS, centred their televised documentaries around historical, military, wartime and event-related genres. The 1960s are frequently celebrated as the "Golden Age" of television documentary within the United States. At this time, television documentaries began to hold increasing importance within both journalistic and political realms. Notably, the Kennedy administration believed that televised documentaries could contribute towards the American efforts to constrain the growth of communism.

Television documentary continued to grow in popularity globally throughout the forthcoming decades. James Chapman notes Royal Family (1969) as "the best indication of the cultural acceptance" of television documentary. Following its screening, Royal Family amassed viewership figures of 40 million people globally.

=== 1970–2000 ===
The latter decades of the twentieth century saw television documentary decline in popularity on commercial broadcasting networks, rather screening primarily via cable television networks. This saw the rise of several specialised documentary channels, such as The History Channel and National Geographic, in the early 2000s. During this period in the United States, PBS continued to screen investigative television documentaries. Moreover, this period also saw the emergence of television documentaries produced by minority groups, offering novel cultural and political opinions.

=== Contemporary television documentary ===
A new medium for documentary broadcasting emerged in the 2000s and continued to rise to prominence in the 2010s. Interactive documentaries, otherwise known as i-docs or web documentaries, often accompany traditionally broadcast television documentaries, featuring interactive hyper-links, audio, text and images. Interactive documentaries have been recognised in recent film festivals, such as the Tribeca Film Festival and the Sundance Film Festival, largely for their success in educational and historical media productions.

The current trajectory of television documentary productions is widely suggested to transit towards streaming services such as Netflix and Stan. This trend coincides with the emergence of brand-sponsored documentaries. For instance, Johnson & Johnson commissioned the production of 5B, depicting several nurses who founded an AIDS ward at the San Francisco General Hospital. The documentary aligns with Johnson and Johnson's brand focus on "care" and "touch". Tim Stevenson indicates that brand-sponsored documentaries allow marketers to access widespread audiences through mediums that traditional advertising methods cannot.

== Production techniques ==
Early television documentaries were produced by recording the relevant visual and sonic media separately. Sixteen millimetre film cameras, often positioned on tripods, captured the image, utilising accompanying lighting and filtering equipment. Sound was recorded using a quarter inch sound recorder alongside several microphones. During post-production, the visual and sonic elements were syncopated.

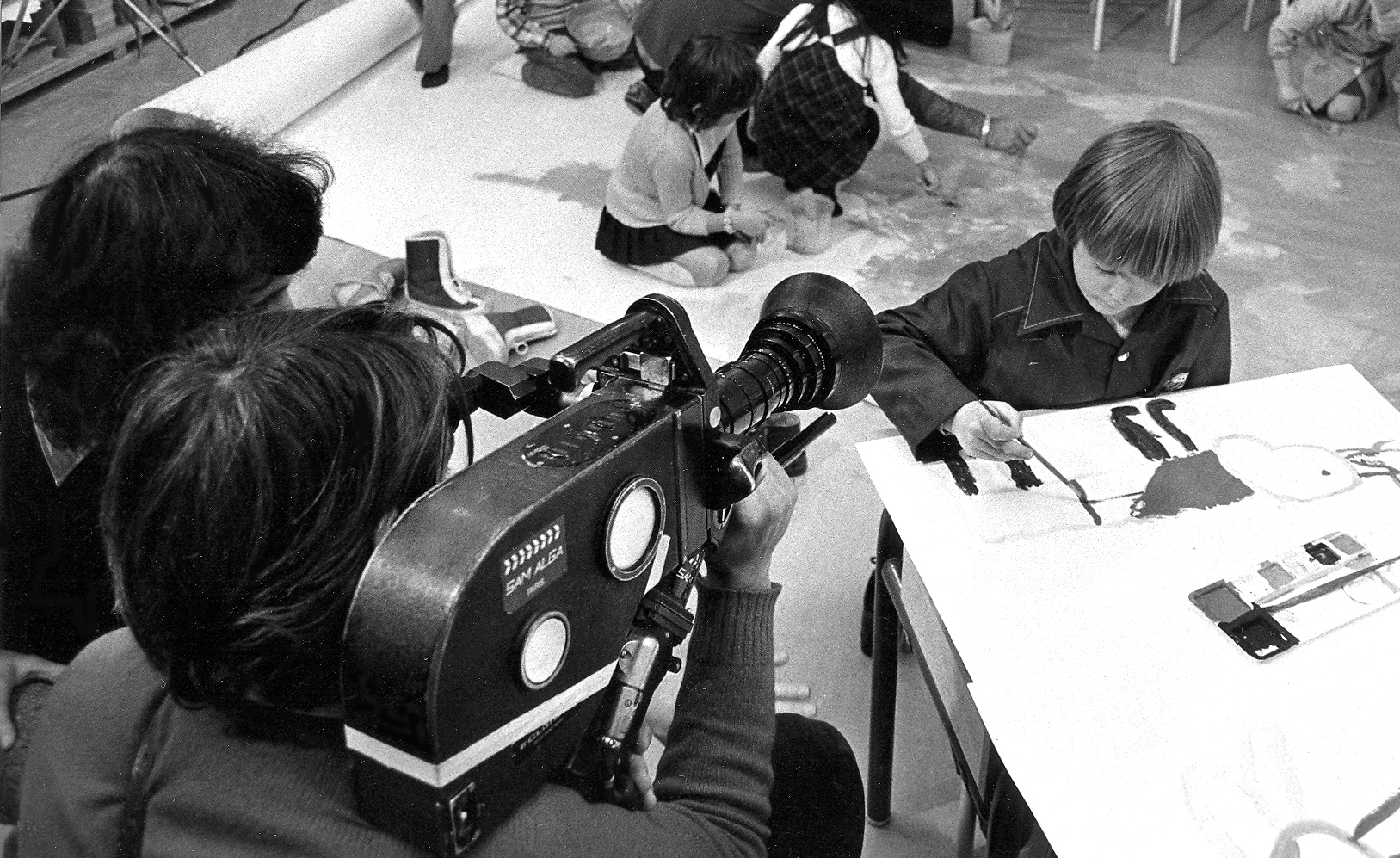
Recording with an Éclair 16mm film camera.

Particularly prominent equipment utilised throughout the early period of television documentary production included Éclair 16mm film cameras, in conjunction with Nagra sound recorders. Contemporary attempts to recreate a similar vintage production environment note such methods to be inefficient and often faulty.

The early 1970s sparked revolutionary changes within documentary production techniques. Marshall McLuhan and Buckminster Fuller inspired a revolt against the existing traditional methods of information communication to American society. Sony's newly developed Portapak video camera was a significant tool that spurred the Guerrilla television campaign and was recognised for its facilitation of the transfer of video tape recordings from one company's device to another company's respective device.

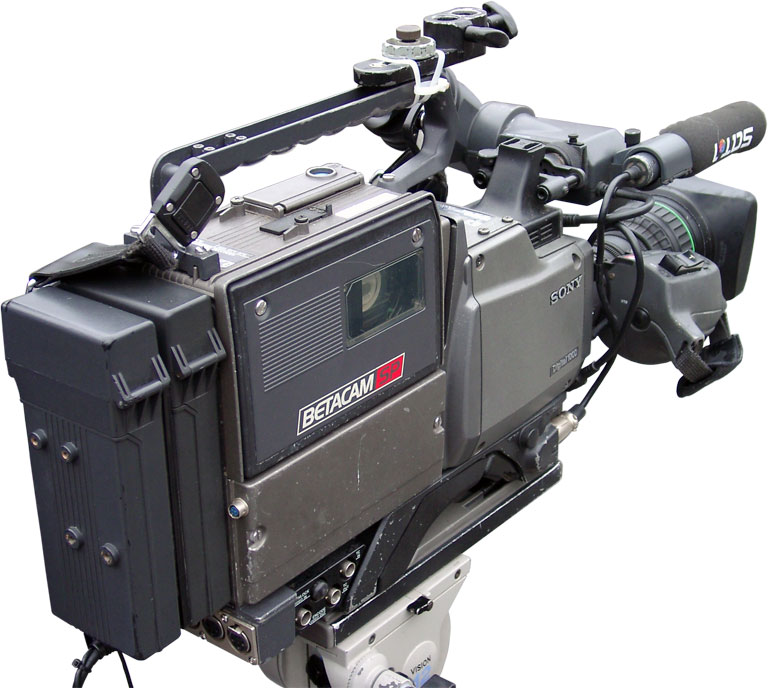
Sony Betacam SP Camcorder

The next significant development within television documentary production techniques came in the 1980s with the introduction of portable video recorders, also known as camcorders. Most notably, Sony developed the Betacam. This product was renowned for advancing the mobility and flexibility of video cameras, thereby facilitating heightened efficiency during documentary production. Moreover, camcorders allowed for substantial production cost reductions in relation to traditional film camera production techniques, thereby allowing for increased amounts of footage to be captured. This led camcorders to almost entirely replace film cameras by the end of the twentieth century. Glover suggests that this widespread adoption of digital documentary production methods provided novel opportunities for documentaries to "take on any or several of the modes" of documentary as defined by Bill Nichols. This lends particular convenience to the production of the 'slide-show' approach, which shows framed-stills with narrating 'talking heads' – a "constant staple" of television documentary.

== Genres ==
Early British television documentaries held a large focus upon historical events, locations and governing states. Additionally, war documentaries rose to prominence in the late 1940s and early 1950s, illustrating efforts of the Allied Forces in the Second World War. Investigative television documentaries also grew in popularity during the 1950s. Chad Raphael highlights CBS's See It Now (1951–1955) as being a landmark television documentary that spawned the investigative genre, marking the "first critical journalism on television." Later, in the 1960s, televised documentary genres continued to expand; Natural history and wildlife subjects became popular documentary subjects.

So too did documentaries that explored themes of humanity. Civilisation (1969), a thirteen-part documentary series broadcast on BBC Two, portraying the course of Western civilisation, was famed for its utilisation of then-contemporary, colourised television media.

Television documentaries continue to spotlight wartime, historical, governmental and wildlife subjects. Contemporary genres of television documentaries also include sport, health, economic, social media and celebrity subjects.

== Criticism ==
The continued emergence of television documentary within historical and informative media contexts has engaged significant debate and controversy surrounding its wide-reaching influence. These controversies typically consist of ethical, cultural, social and political concerns. Televised documentary media has been considered to create ethical controversy surrounding the incomplete portrayal of an event; ethical controversy following image modification via digital editing techniques and ethical concerns regarding the verifiability of the information presented within an image. As such, defamation within television documentary has been a persistent source of controversy. ITV's 2003 documentary, Living with Michael Jackson, drew criticism from Michael Jackson, who claimed that the film "utterly betrayed" him in its portrayal of his relationships with young children. Similarly, Fahrenheit 9/11 (2004) raised concerns regarding the factual accuracy and honesty of its portrayal of the geopolitics of George W. Bush's administration. Such factual discrepancies have led to frequent suggestions that television documentary occasionally deviates from accurate historical representations, rather escalating drama for entertainment purposes.

The cultural influence of television documentary has frequently been under public scrutiny. Such concerns date to the initial emergence of televised documentary within public spheres. Cultural controversy arose regarding the BBC's 1965 production, The War Game. Despite previous broadcasting approval, the BBC later concluded that the documentary was "too horrifying for the medium of broadcasting," thus, it was not publicly broadcast. Later remarks affirmed that the BBC took such an approach with concern for the potentially negative institutional and cultural influence arising from public televised broadcasting of The War Game.

Contemporary studies have been conducted with specific focus on evaluating the social and political influence of television documentaries. Feldman and Sigelman conducted a study in 1985, analysing the effect of the television docudrama, The Day After, presenting the aftermath that could unfold following a Soviet nuclear attack upon the Kansas City area. They concluded that the docudrama held influence upon other newspaper and television stories, particularly regarding discussions of arms limitations with the Soviet Union. The study also found that public concerns heightened regarding the United States' ability to survive following a major nuclear attack. Additionally, The Day After sparked debate about whether or not President Reagan should have increased public defence expenditure. Similarly, another study concluded that several recent social-issue documentaries, including Semper Fi, held "situated knowledge" and thus were influential within the United States in enacting law reform.

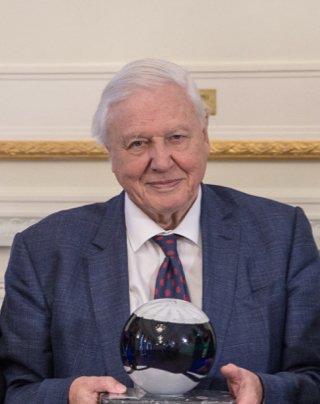
David Attenborough in 2018.

The advancement and contemporary formatting of popular television documentary productions has also drawn controversy in recent years. In 2014, famed documentary narrator, David Attenborough, expressed an opinion in which he lamented the contemporary state of television documentaries. He believed modern audiences to lack an interest in lengthy documentary series, rather favouring miniseries composed of two or three episodes. He suggested that these miniseries do not "deal with something properly." Instead, Attenborough longed for a "stronger commitment and belief" in one subject matter, facilitating extended documentary series production once more.

The emergence of streaming services into the cultural broadcasting mainstream throughout the 2010s in particular, has also sparked contemporary controversy surrounding the format and classification of televised documentaries. Subsequently, the Academy of Television Arts & Sciences (ATAS), a leading professional honorary organisation that champions the advancement of the television industry in the United States, has recognised documentaries published by streaming services as eligible for consideration for an Emmy Award. Televised media, broadcast via streaming services, has grown so much in popularity such that Netflix-produced television shows received a record 160 nominations in the 72nd Primetime Emmy Awards in 2020. This achievement was followed by streaming service rival HBO, who received 107 nominations in 2020. Notably, the 2020 grand prize for Outstanding Documentary or Nonfiction Series was won by ESPN's The Last Dance (2020) which was streamed on Netflix globally.

== Example channels ==
- Al Jazeera Documentary Channel
- Animal Planet
- CGTN Documentary
- Discovery Channel
- DOC: The Documentary Channel
- Docu TVE
- Documentary (TV channel)
- History
- National Geographic
- Science
- Smithsonian Channel
- World Channel

== See also ==
- Bill Nichols (film critic)
- Documentary film
- Documentary mode
- Filmmaking
- John Grierson
- List of documentary television channels
- Mockumentary
- Public-access television
- Sponsored film
- Walter Goodman (critic)
