= Sporn =

Sporn is a surname. Notable people with the surname include:

- Andrej Sporn (born 1981), former Slovenian alpine skier
- Jon Sporn (born 1997), Slovenian football midfielder
- Kalman Sporn (born 1971), American businessman
- Kieran Sporn (born 1966), former Australian rules footballer
- Michael B. Sporn (born 1933), American professor emeritus of pharmacology, toxicology and medicine at Dartmouth Medical School
- Michael Sporn (1946–2014), American animator who founded his New York City-based company, Michael Sporn Animation
- Pam Sporn, filmmaker and teacher
- Philip Sporn (1896–1978), Austrian electrical engineer, president and CEO of the American Gas and Electric Company
- Rachael Sporn OAM (born 1968), Australian former basketball player and three time Olympian
- Stane Sporn or Stane Šporn (born 1904), Yugoslav long-distance runner
- Trent Sporn (born 1982), former Australian rules footballer

== See also ==
- Leininger Sporn, highly prominent ridge in the northeast of the Palatinate Forest in western Germany
