= Big Enough (disambiguation) =

Big Enough is a song by Kirin J. Callinan.

Big Enough may also refer to:

- Big Enough (film), a 2004 documentary film by Jan Krawitz
- "Big Enough" (Ayiesha Woods song) (2006)
- "Big Enough", a 1988 song by Keith Richards from Talk Is Cheap
