= Milwaukee Rescue Mission =

Homeless shelter in Milwaukee, Wisconsin, US

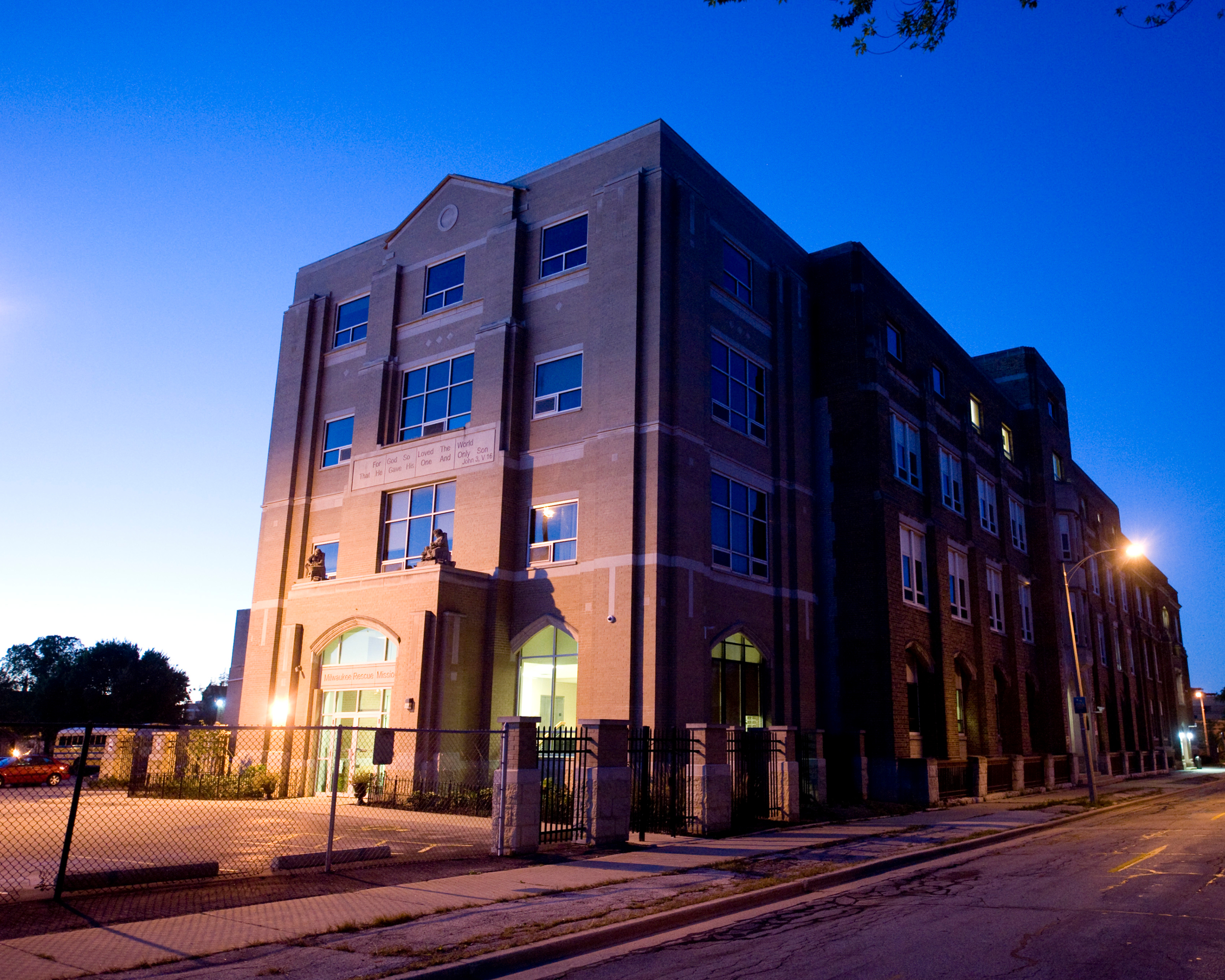
The Milwaukee Rescue Mission has been located at 19th and Wells since 1986.

The Milwaukee Rescue Mission (MRM) provides meals, shelter, education and addiction recovery services to struggling men, women and children. MRM's mission statement says:

Sharing God's love by caring for those who are poor in body, mind and spirit, to see lives transformed through Christ to hope, joy and lasting productivity.

Since 1893, MRM has helped hurting people restore their lives and their hope. On any given night there are nearly 1,000 homeless people in Milwaukee. They seek to meet those in need where they are by offering practical assistance like food (approximately 340,000 meals in 2024), clothing (nearly 81,000 items), and shelter (over 67,000 nights) to those in need. In addition, MRM offers trans-formative programs that equip struggling men, women, and children to get off the streets and turn their lives around for good. While practical assistance is important, MRM offers both short- and long-term programming that includes education, counseling, help in overcoming substance abuse, job training and much more. The organization addresses the root causes of problems, rather than stopping at simple temporary fixes. As a non-denominational Christian organization, it provides spiritual development and enrichment, all based on the good news of the Gospel; it professes that the Gospel message is the key to lasting change. The Milwaukee Rescue Mission is part of the Citygate Network.

== Location ==
The Milwaukee Rescue Mission has campuses located at 830 N 19th Street in the historic Milwaukee Girls' Trade and Technical High School building in the Avenues West neighborhood of Milwaukee and at 1530 W Center Street. Milwaukee holds the position of the second poorest city in the United States among cities of its size. The Milwaukee Rescue Mission has occupied the Central Campus at the corner of 19th and Wells Streets since 1986. Prior to that, the shelter was located in a building near the BMO Harris Bradley Center. The City of Milwaukee claimed eminent domain over that property, which served as a parking lot for the arena. In 2015, the organization acquired its North Campus, located on 15th and Center in the heart of the Lindsay Heights neighborhood. Lindsay Heights is located in the zip code 53206, featured in the award-winning documentary Milwaukee 53206 as the zip code claiming the highest rate of incarceration in the United States. Milwaukee Rescue Mission's North Campus currently houses its K-12th grade school, Cross Trainers Academy and community outreach programs. The Central Campus houses shelter and transitional living programs for men, women and children.

== Services ==
Due to the great need in the Milwaukee area, the Milwaukee Rescue Mission has a broad range of services, including the following:

- Safe Harbor for Men: Safe Harbor provides help for homeless men. For those with short-term, emergency needs, the Milwaukee Rescue Mission provides meals, shelter, clothing, counseling, education and job search resources. In addition to short term help, The Milwaukee Rescue Mission also offers transformational programs. that include addiction recovery, Bible studies, computer-based and instructor-led education programs, GED preparation and testing, work therapy and on-the-job training, personal mentoring, educational support, financial/legal guidance and assistance in securing employment and housing. Transitional living programming helps men secure employment, manage their finances, handle legal issues, find strength through Christian counseling and restore broken relationships.
- Joy House for Women and Children: Joy House provides housing and assistance for women and their families who are homeless. There are many reasons that women may find themselves homeless, but primary reasons include domestic violence, divorce, death of a spouse and job loss. In addition to emergency aid, Joy House cares for women in-depth programming equipping women with the real-world skills and spiritual guidance they need to prepare for an independent, stable and secure life. The programming includes: job search training, basic adult education, Christian counseling and education, parenting and life-skills classes, financial management principles and one-on-one case management.
- Cross Trainers Academy: Cross Trainers Academy was founded in 2006 to be an educational option for youth in the neighborhood. Without a solid education, compassionate mentors and a firm foundation, many living in poverty are likely to perpetuate the cycle of poverty and its frequent results: violence, substance abuse and homelessness. Study after study has shown that education is an incredibly important part of getting out of such situations. The Milwaukee Rescue Mission started Cross Trainers Academy with the express purpose of providing children with the opportunity for an excellent, Christian-based education that will equip them with academic, social, emotional and spiritual tools for life. In 2015, the school moved to its North Campus at 15th and Center streets. CTA has approximately 400 students enrolled with a 20:1 student/staff ratio. The school serves students from Kindergarten through 12th grade.

== Sponsorship ==
A list of event sponsors can be accessed on the Milwaukee Rescue Mission's site. The efforts of the Milwaukee Rescue Mission are made possible by generous gifts from individuals, churches, foundations and businesses.
