= Bill Nichols (film critic) =

American film critic and historian

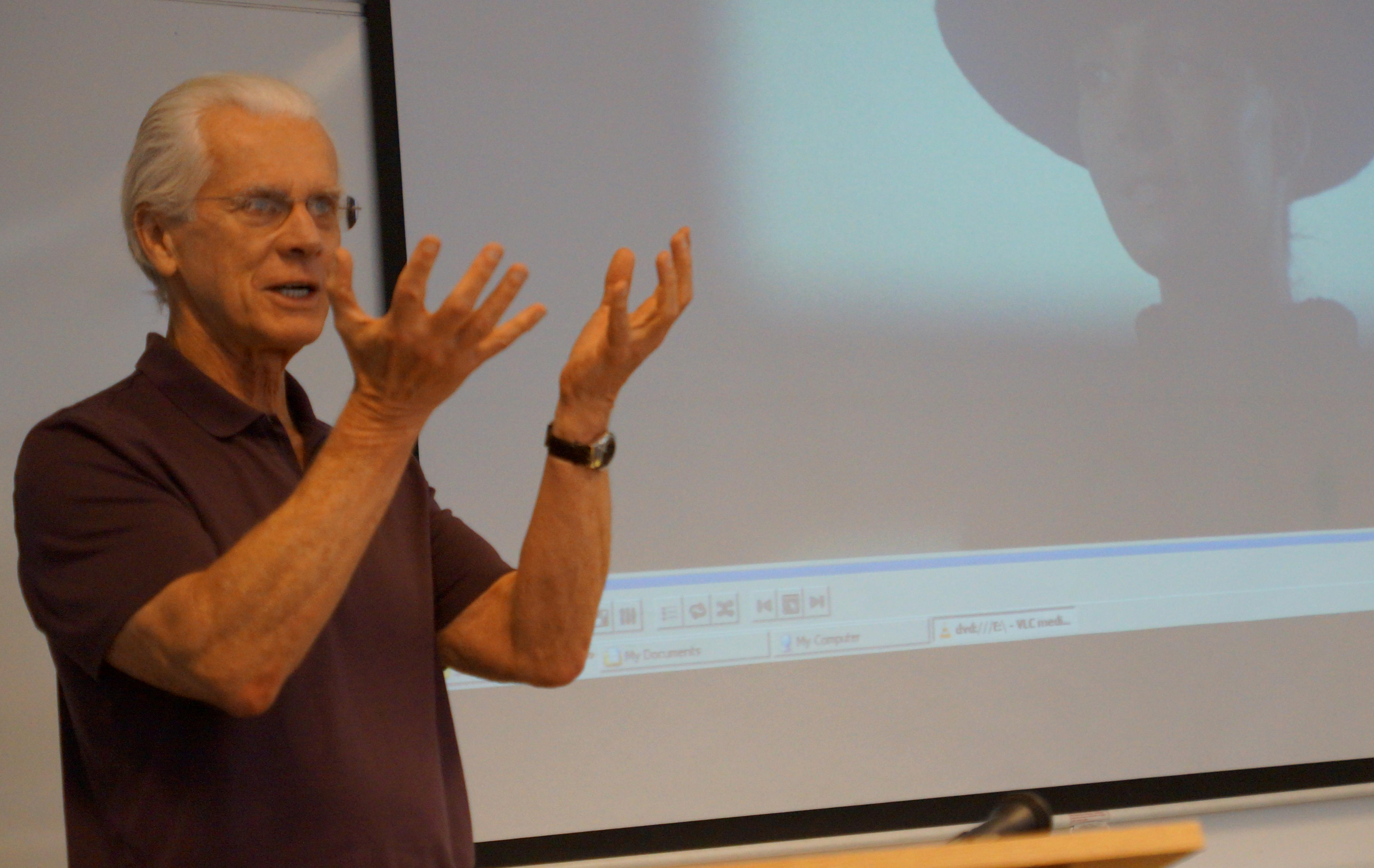
- Nichols at a film seminar, the Central European University in Budapest, June 2013
- Born: 1942 (age 83–84)
- Notable work: Introduction to documentary (2010) Engaging Cinema (2010) The Cinema's Alchemist: The Films of Peter Forgacs (2011)

Bill Nichols (born 1942) is an American film critic and theoretician known for founding the contemporary study of documentary film. His 1991 book, Representing Reality: Issues and Concepts in Documentary, applied modern film theory to the study of documentary film for the first time. It was followed by additional books and essays. The first of his two-volume anthology Movies and Methods (1976, 1985) helped to establish film studies as an academic discipline.

Nichols is Professor Emeritus in the Cinema Department at San Francisco State University and Chair of the Documentary Film Institute advisory board.

Nichols has lectured in numerous countries, served on film festival juries on different continents, consults regularly on a variety of filmmaking projects, and has published over 100 articles.

He is former president of the Society for Cinema and Media Studies, a former advisor to the American Film Institute and has served as Department Chair in Canada and the United States. Encyclopedia of the Documentary Film describes his place within film studies as "the most significant documentary scholar in the world". Nichols created a conceptual framework for the study and production of documentary film.

== Writings ==
Author

- Newsreel: Documentary Filmmaking on the American Left, New York : Arno Press, 1980.
- Ideology and the Image: Social Representation in the Cinema and Other Media, Bloomington: Indiana University Press, 1981. ISBN 978-0-253-18287-6
- Blurred Boundaries: Questions of Meaning in Contemporary Culture, Bloomington: Indiana University Press, 1994. ISBN 978-0-253-20900-9
- Representing Reality: Issues and Concepts in Documentary, Bloomington: Indiana University Press, 1991. ISBN 978-0-253-20681-7
- Introduction to Documentary, 3rd edition. Bloomington, Ind.: Indiana University Press, 2017. ISBN 978-0-253-02685-9
- Engaging Cinema: An Introduction to Film Studies. W. W. Norton & Company, 2010. ISBN 978-0-393-93491-5
- The Cinema’s Alchemist: The Films of Péter Forgács (co-editor Michael Renov). University of Minnesota Press, 2011. ISBN 978-0-8166-4875-7
- Speaking Truths with Film: Evidence, Ethics, Politics in Documentary, University Of California Press, 2016 ISBN 978-0520290402

Editor

- Movies and Methods: An Anthology, University of California Press, 1985. Vol. 1 ISBN 978-0-520-03151-7, Vol 2 ISBN 978-0-520-05409-7
- Maya Deren and the American Avant-Garde, University of California Press, 2001. ISBN 978-0-520-22732-3

== See also ==
- Paul Rotha
- Documentary mode
