= Lad, A Yorkshire Story =

2013 British drama film

Lad: A Yorkshire Story
- Directed by: Dan Hartley
- Written by: Dan Hartley
- Produced by: Dan Hartley; Richard B. Shean
- Starring: Bretten Lord; Alan Gibson; Nancy Clarkson; Robert Hayes
- Cinematography: David Mackie
- Edited by: Dawn Feather; Dan Hartley
- Music by: Samuel Sim
- Production company: Rogue Runner
- Release date: 2013
- Running time: 93 minutes
- Country: England
- Language: English
- Budget: £65,000

Lad: A Yorkshire Story is a 2013 British film detailing the coming-of-age of 13 year-old Tom, who goes off the rails after his father dies. Tom is given community service after committing an offence, the sentence being to work with a Yorkshire Dales park ranger repairing paths and building stiles. The film was released in 2013 after being adapted from a short film from 2011 by the same director.

The film was only given a limited release as its director, Dan Hartley, could not find a distributor. However, during the 2020 lockdowns caused by the COVID-19 pandemic, online downloads of the film soared to over 400,000 and the film garnered praise from viewers.

== Synopsis ==
Tom Proctor is a 13-year-old boy living in the Yorkshire Dales. One day, his father, who is a quarryman, unexpectedly dies, and when the bank threatens to foreclose on his deceased father's house mortgage, the family fear they will lose the quarry cottage.

In protest Tom borrows a tractor and sprays the local bank with manure, which gets him into trouble and he is made to do community service with Al, a Yorkshire Dales park ranger. At the same time, Tom and his mum worry about each other and Tom's older brother Nick, whom he idolises, joins the army.

== Cast ==
- Bretten Lord as Tom Proctor
- Alan Gibson as Al Thorpe
- Nancy Clarkson as Sarah Proctor
- Robert Hayes as Nick Proctor
- Liam Thomas as David Proctor
- Molly McGlynn as Lucy Thorpe
- Oliver Exley as Sean Ackerthwaite
- Nick Fawcett as Farmer Blight
- Mario Demetriou as PC Baxter
- John Hayes as Quarry foreman
- Rita Davies as Bookshop owner
- Alex Froom as Postman
- Richard Sails as Headmaster
- Mitch Low as New ranger
- Niall Thorpe as Tom's friend
- Giles Bowring as Lord Gisburn

== Production ==
The film was shot in and around the Yorkshire Dales, (within a 10-mile (16 km) radius of Settle) where Dan Hartley, the writer and director, grew up. It is partly autobiographical, with the character of Tom being based on Dan Hartley, and that of Al being based on a park ranger who Dan worked with in his teens. Hartley said he is from the area originally and he came back "into the community to make the film, and the cast is people who live here." He went on to say that many members of the cast had never acted before, including both lead characters, Bretten Lord and former soldier Alan Gibson. He said they held open auditions in Cumbria and North Yorkshire in 2011 and it "worked out really well using people who hadn't acted before."

One of the reasons why distributors were reluctant to sign up to distribute the film was the lack of a 'name' in the cast. In fact, prior to the filming of Lad, the two main actors had not acted professionally before. Alan Gibson, who played Al, the park ranger, claimed to have been a soldier in the SAS.

== Reception ==
Steve Morrissey, writing in the Radio Times gave the film three stars out of five saying that "[Bretten Lord] delivers a charismatic debut performance". The Video Librarian wrote, "based on his own 2011 short film, filmmaker Dan Hartley expands his original simple tale with atmospheric scenes shot in the hills and moors of the Dales; an affecting story of a brokenhearted child who experiences great loss and rapid change, this is recommended."

Sheila Intner from Library Journal commented that "splendid casting, wonderfully understated acting, and beautiful camera work contribute to the ups and downs that make Lad well worth watching.

The movie won awards for Best Film and Best Feature Narrative Film, at the Mexico International and Anchorage International Film Festival's respectively. Bretten Lord was named best child actor at the Hollywood International Family Festival.

The film became a surprise download/streaming success during the 2020 lockdowns. Over 1.5 million people had watched it on YouTube in 2020 and it had amassed over 400,000 in viewing figures on Amazon Prime. Whilst the film was shot on a budget of £65,000, Hartley acknowledges that he won't make any money off of the project. The film peaked at number five in the iTunes independent chart mere days after it was made available for nationwide release. Hartley remarked that "as the only self-distributed film to appear in the top 100 it's testament to the support of our fans and the terrific word of mouth the film has garnered."
