= Samuel Sim =

British composer, record producer, musician and songwriter

Samuel Sim is a British composer, record producer, musician and songwriter. His work includes concert music, recordings, arrangements and film and television scores. He writes in orchestral as well as electronic and contemporary idioms, and is known for his use of choir and vocal elements in his music.

Recent releases include the Ivor Novello Award nominated score for the series The Mill, the soundtrack for Home Fires, released 6 May 2016 by Sony Classical Records. and the music to The Halcyon released by Decca Records in January 2017.

== Biography ==
=== Film and television scores ===
2022

- Anne

==== 2021 ====
- Domina
- Innocent II
- The Feast
- The Bay: Season III

==== 2020 ====
- Maiden
- The Bay: Season II
- The Spanish Princess
- Murder in the Carpark

==== 2019 ====
- Anne (TV Mini-series)
- The Cure (Movie)
- The Bay
- The Victim
- The Dark Crystal: Age of Resistance (with Daniel Pemberton)

==== 2018 ====
- Maiden
- The Interrogation of Tony Martin (TV Movie)
- Innocent

2017

- Maigret in Montmartre
- Unspeakable
- Diana
- On a Knife Edge
- Paula
- Born to Kill
- Maigret: Night at the Crossroads
- The Halcyon

2016

- Maigret's Dead Man
- Home Fires – Season II
- Murdered by My Father
- Maigret Sets a Trap

2015

- Home Fires – Season I
- Coalition
- Chasing Shadows

==== 2014 ====
- The Mill – Season II
- Stop at Nothing

2013

- By Any Means
- Women Behind Bars
- A Touch of Cloth – Season II
- Ice Cream Girls
- Lad: A Yorkshire Story
- Salma
- Inside Death Row

==== 2012 ====
- In the Shadow of the Sun
- We Are Poets
- Fathers Day
- Of Two Minds
- Mad Dogs

2011

- Combat Hospital
- The Reckoning

2010

- The Deep
- Flak
- 10 Minute Tales

==== 2009 ====
- Emma
- The Damned United
- W.M.D.
- Snowblind
- Kröd Mändoon
- Iran and the West
- Ghosts of the 7th Cavalry

==== 2008 ====
- House of Saddam

==== 2007 ====
- Awake
- Only Human

==== 2006 ====
- Bobby
- Doogal

==== 2005 ====
- Dunkirk

== Soundtrack releases ==
- Emma – A recording of Sim's soundtrack for the 2009 BBC television drama of Jane Austen's Emma was released on 1 December 2009
- Mad Dogs – Original Television Soundtrack – Red Stamp Records – 2012
- The Mill – Original Television Soundtrack for Channel 4's drama series was released February 2015 on Red Stamp Records
- Coalition Original Soundtrack – Red Stamp Records – 2015
- Home Fires Soundtrack featuring the single "Siren" released 6 May 2016 by Sony Classical Records.
- The Halcyon – Original Television Soundtrack featuring the hit single "Hourglass" written and produced by Samuel Sim, feat. Tracy Kashi on Vocals was released by Decca Records in January 2017
- On a Knife Edge – Original Motion Picture Soundtrack released January 2018
- The Bay – Original Television Soundtrack released March 2022
- Domina – Original Television Soundtrack – Dubois Records – 2021

== Awards and nominations ==
Year	Award	Category	Film	Result	Ref.
2005	Biarritz International Festival of Audiovisual Programming	Best Music Original Musical Score	Dunkirk	Won	
2010	Royal Television Society	Best Music, Original Score	Emma	Nominated	
2010	Royal Television Society	Best Music, Original Titles	The Deep	Nominated	
2014	Royal Television Society	Best Music, Original Titles	By Any Means	Won	
2015	Ivor Novello Awards	Best Original Score	The Mill	Nominated	
2016	Royal Television Society	Best Music, Original Titles	Home Fires	Won	
2016	Royal Television Society	Best Music, Original Score	Home Fires	Won	
2018	Bafta Award	Best Music, Original Score	Born to Kill	Nominated	
2019	Royal Television Society	Best Music, Original Titles	The Bay	Won	
