= Khadijah Ibrahiim =

Literary activist, theatre maker and writer

Khadijah Ibrahiim FRSL
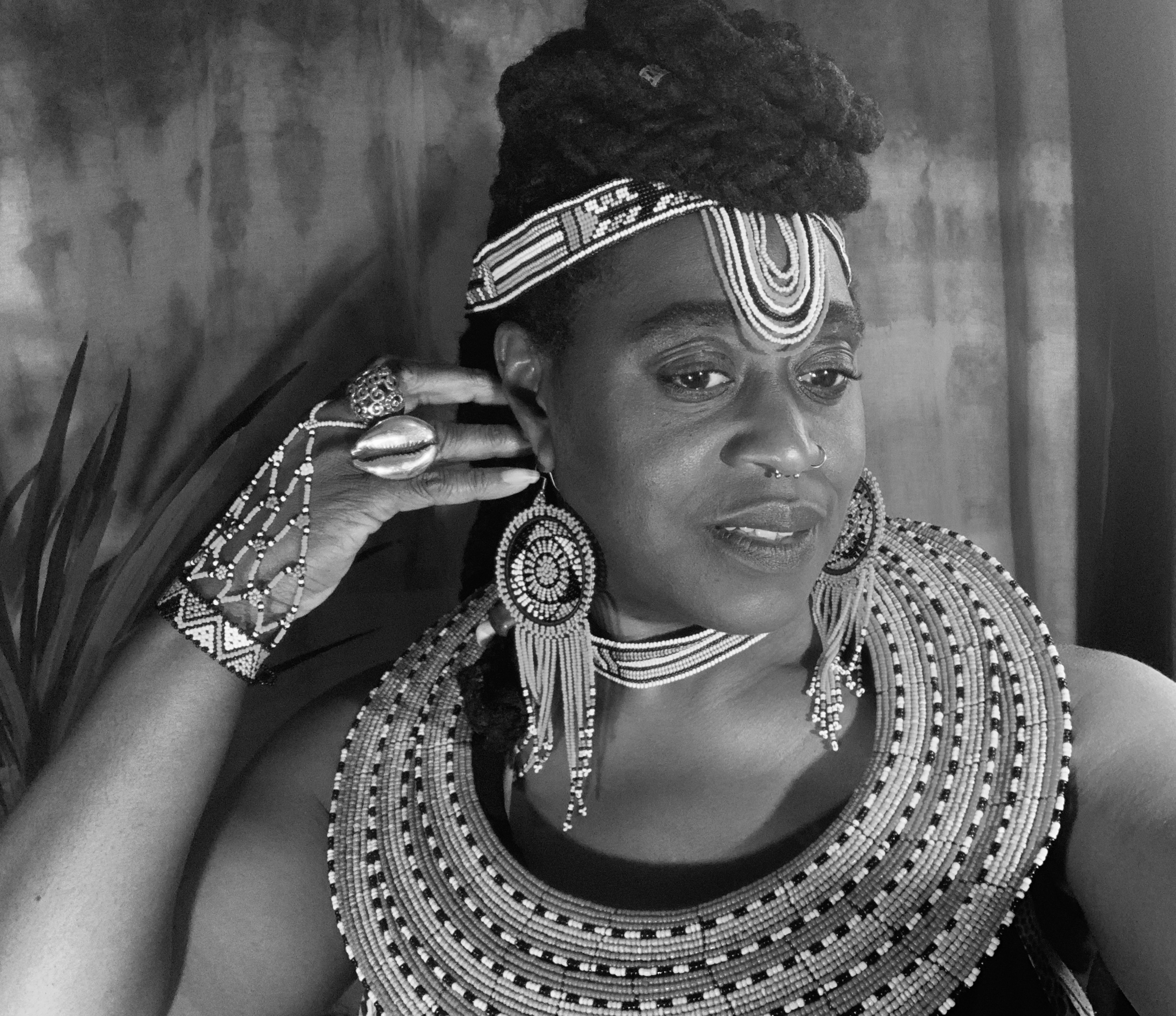
- Born: Leeds, England
- Education: University of Leeds
- Occupations: Literary activist, theatre maker and writer

Khadijah Ibrahiim FRSL is a literary activist, theatre maker and writer from Leeds, England. She is the founder and artistic director of Leeds Young Authors, and executive producer of the documentary We Are Poets. She and her work have appeared on BBC Radio 1Xtra, BBC Radio 3 and BBC Radio 4.

== Biography ==
Ibrahiim is of Jamaican parentage, her politically active grandparents were two of the 5,000 people who came to Leeds in the 1950s. She was born in Leeds and she would meet Jamaican musicians who visited her home. She attended the University of Leeds and has a master's degree in Theatre Studies. She has toured her work in America, Caribbean, Africa and Asia.

== Career ==
In 2003, she started Leeds Young Authors, running workshops in the Chapeltown area of Leeds funded by a small grant from the Arts Council. After a year, the money was gone but the enthusiasm remained, so the workers became volunteers.

Ibrahiim attended the Calabash International Literary Festival in Jamaica and she was one of the first international writers to attend the El Gouna Writers Residency in Egypt, 2010. In the following year, she was given the Leeds Black Award 2011 for outstanding contribution to arts. In 2013, she was one of several poets invited to Buckingham Palace, where the Queen and Prince Philip honoured the work of contemporary British poetry.

In 2017, she was creative associate for the theatre production Ode To Leeds at the West Yorkshire Playhouse. In 2008, she toured the USA with the Fwords Creative Freedom writers. She produces the Leeds Youth Poetry Slam Festival. Ibrahiim's work includes Dead and Wake, part of Connecting Voices, a collaboration between Leeds Playhouse and Opera North in 2020; The Promise of a Garden as associate director of the Performance Ensemble; Sorrel & Black Cake as writer and director with the Geraldine Connor Foundation; Symphonic Dancers, as writer and poet for Phoenix Dance. In 2019, Ibrahiim and two other poets were commissioned as part of the British Library, Leeds Libraries and Poet in the City collaboration Collections in Verse. She continued her work with the British Library and Leeds Libraries by hosting a spoken-word event with Suhaiymah Manzoor-Khan as part of the Unfinished Business: The Fight for Women's Rights project.

In 2020, during the COVID-19 pandemic, the Geraldine Connor Foundation organised an on-line event to celebrate Windrush Day. The event was hosted by Ibrahiim and academic Emily Zobel Marshall. Guests were the writer Colin Grant, poet Linton Kwesi Johnson, and Camille Quamina from Jamaica.

Ibrahiim's poetry has been published by Peepal Tree Press, which publishes international writing from the Caribbean, its diasporas and the UK.

Her work has appeared in university journals and poetry anthologies and on BBC Radio 4 Radio 3 and BBC Radio 1Xtra.

Ibrahiim was elected a Fellow of the Royal Society of Literature in 2024 and awarded an Honorary Degree from the University of Leeds in 2025.

== Publications ==
- Voices of Women (Yorkshire Arts, 2003)
- Hair (Suitcase Press, 2006)
- Rootz Runnin (Peepal Tree Press, 2008)
- Red: An Anthology of Contemporary Black British Poetry, edited by Kwame Dawes (Peepal Tree Press, 2010)
- Out of Bounds: British Black & Asian Poets, edited by Jackie Kay, James Procter, Gemma Robinson (Bloodaxe, 2012)
- Another Crossing (Peepal Tree Press, 2014)
- The Dreams of Those Who Stay Awake, edited by Khadijah Ibrahiim (First Story Limited, 2019)
- The Sea Needs No Ornament: A Bilingual Anthology of Contemporary Caribbean Women Poets, edited by Loretta Collins Klobah, Maria Grau Perejoan (Peepal Tree Press, 2020)
- More Fiya: A New Collection of Black British Poetry, edited by Kayo Chingonyi (Canongate, Edinburgh, 2022)

== Awards and recognition ==
Leeds Black Award 2011

In 2017 and 2019, Ibrahiim was shortlisted for the Jerwood Compton Poetry Fellowship.

In 2018, she was shortlisted for the Sue Rider "Yorkshire Woman of the Year" award for her contribution to the arts.

Ibrahiim was elected Fellow of the Royal Society of Literature (RSL) in 2024. She signed the RSL roll with Andrea Levy's pen. Her published collection Another Crossing was published by Peepal Tree Press in 2014.

== Private life ==
Ibrahiim has a daughter, Rheima Robinson, who is also a poet.
