= On a Knife Edge =

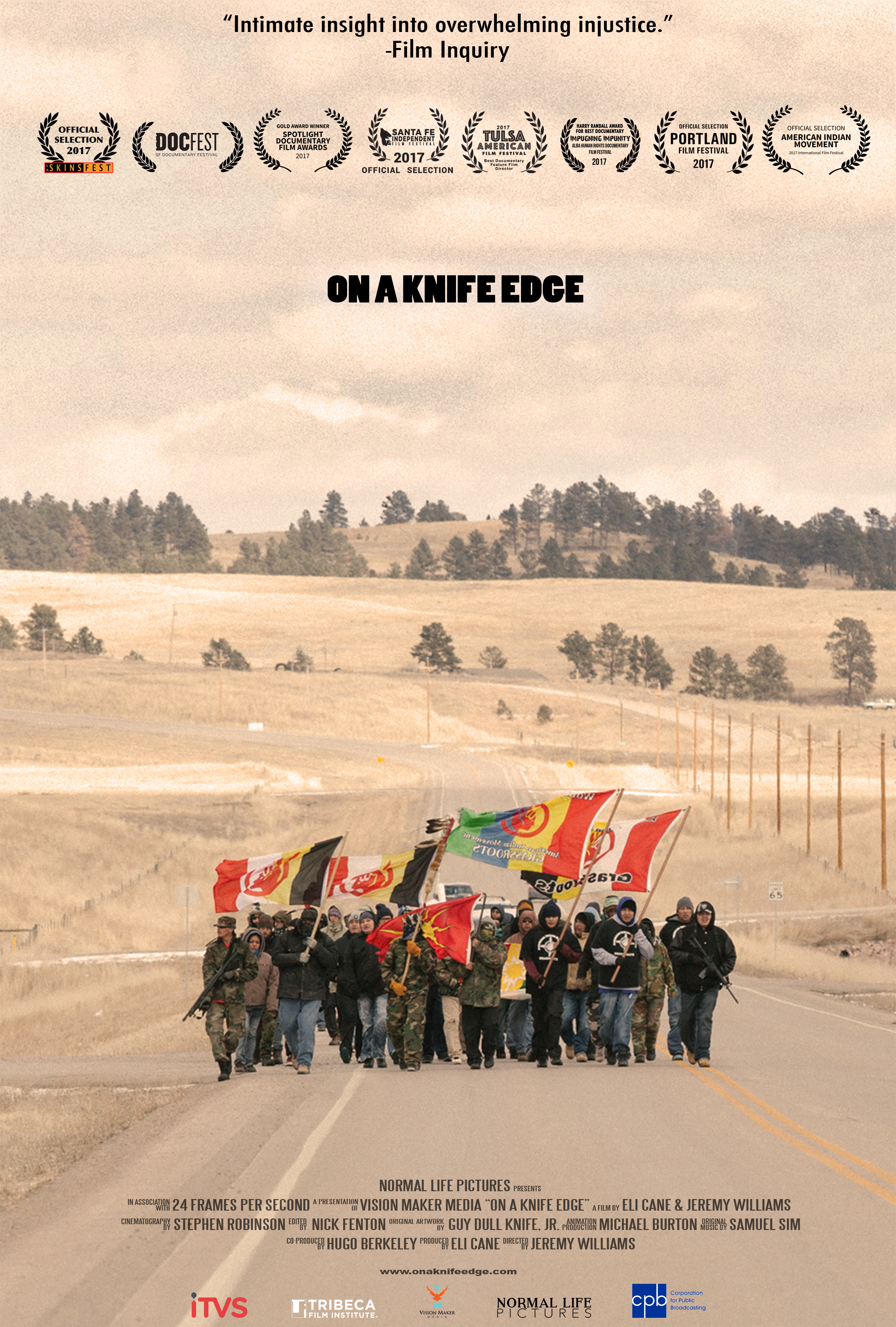
- Official film poster
- Directed by: Jeremy Williams
- Produced by: Eli Cane
- Cinematography: Stephen Robinson
- Edited by: Nick Fenton
- Music by: Samuel Sim
- Distributed by: Journeyman Films; America ReFramed
- Release dates: June 10, 2017 (SF Doc Fest); November 7, 2017 (United States)
- Running time: 89 minutes
- Country: United States
- Language: English

On a Knife Edge is a 2017 American documentary film directed by Jeremy Williams and produced by Eli Cane. The film premiered at the 2017 SF Doc Festival, and broadcast nationally on the World Channel show America ReFramed on November 7, 2017.

On a Knife Edge is shot in an observational style, following the lives of Guy Dull Knife Jr, and his son, George Dull Knife, as George prepares to become the next leader of his family and becomes politically active in his community. The film is notable for the sheer span of George's life that it covers, documenting a five-year period of George's adolescence. The film was shot on the Pine Ridge Reservation, in Whiteclay, Nebraska, Rapid City, SD, and at Standing Rock.

== Synopsis ==
The film chronicles the coming-of-age of George Dull Knife as he grows up on the Pine Ridge Reservation. He lives with his father and extended family outside of Kyle, SD and is a freshman at Little Wound High School. He is mostly concerned with avoiding the drugs, alcohol, and gangs that permeate life on the Reservation, but soon becomes involved in social justice campaigns combatting police brutality, illegal alcohol sales, and the Keystone XL Pipeline. A pivotal moment occurs when George is 15, after the alleged mutilation of Vern Traversie, a blind Lakota elder who went to Rapid City Regional Hospital for heart surgery in 2012 and emerged with what appeared to be the letters KKK cut into his torso. Amid the community outrage and public protests, George joins the American Indian Movement. Guy Dull Knife is a veteran of AIM from the 1970s, when their activity peaked with the Wounded Knee Occupation, and becomes a guide for George as he becomes more politically active. Together they form a security group, designed to protect protesters from law enforcement or counter-protesters at rallies and marches.

The film follows George's increasing involvement in AIM, with a particular focus on the illegal alcohol sales in Whiteclay, Nebraska. While it is illegal to sell or possess alcohol on the Pine Ridge Reservation, Whiteclay borders the reservation and until September 2017 sold the equivalent of over 4,000,000 cans of beer a year, despite its tiny population of just 12 residents. Much of George's coming of age is shown in the film through his growing role of leadership at AIM protests designed to shut down the alcohol sales at Whiteclay. Towards the end of the film, George becomes disillusioned with AIM and the activist lifestyle, due to repeated failures and the lack of impact their actions seem to have. His father convinces him to remain active, citing his family legacy of resistance to the US Government and describing it as their duty. The film ends at the DAPL protests, where George has recommitted to AIM and his family legacy.

Legacy and the family history are central to the way that Guy raises George and are recurring themes throughout the film. They are demonstrated through a series of animations which depict key moments in Dull Knife family history and are based on paintings created by Guy. Family history and contemporary context are told through these animations, which alternate with George's ongoing story.

== Production ==
Filming began in April 2010 and continued until December 2016. Production trips were conducted in an episodic way and generally lasted from a few days to several weeks, with a small crew, usually from one to three people.

Animations were created simultaneously and during post-production. Nebraska-based artist Michael Burton worked with Guy, creating the painted stop-motion animations in his Lincoln, NE studio.

The film is a coproduction of ITVS, Vision Maker Media, and Normal Life Pictures, Inc. It received additional funding from Tribeca Film Institute, Humanities Nebraska, and the South Dakota Humanities Council.

== Accolades ==
Year	Award	Category	Recipient	Result
2018	Native American Journalists Association - National Native Media Awards	TV – Best Coverage of Native America	Eli Cane and Jeremy Williams	1st Place
2017	Abraham Lincoln Brigade Archive Human Rights Documentary Film Festival	Harry Randall Award for Best Feature	Eli Cane and Jeremy Williams	Won
2017	Tulsa American Film Festival	Best Documentary Director	Jeremy Williams	Won
2017	Portland International Film Festival	Grand Jury Prize, Documentary	Eli Cane and Jeremy Williams	Won
2017	Spotlight Documentary Awards	Gold Award, June 2017	Eli Cane and Jeremy Williams	Won
