= Movies and Methods =

Book series edited by Bill Nichols

Movies and Methods is a book series edited by Bill Nichols, published by University of California Press.

Volume I was published in 1976, while Volume II was published in 1985.

== Reception ==
Dana B. Polan of Stanford University stated that, due to hitherto a lack of books that "treat film as an object worthy of serious analysis", the book therefore is a "welcome" work.
