= Hamza Perez =

American rapper

Hamza Perez is a Puerto Rican former American rap artist who converted to Islam. He has been ranked as one of the 500 most influential Muslims in the world by the royal strategic Islamic center. Hamza spends his time on the streets and jail cells spreading the message of Islam to at-risk youth and communities. He was also a member of the hip-hop group M-Team, a music group that consisted of Hamza and his brother Suliman Perez. They used hip-hop to spread their faith and religious message to other young people. Hamza is the founder of the S.H.E.H.U. Program (Services Helping to Empower and Heal Urban Communities) and one of the co-founders of the Light of the Age Mosque in Pittsburgh, PA. He has also worked with the interfaith poetry project Crossing Limits. In 2009, PBS released a movie entitled "New Muslim Cool" about his life, music, and community.

His conversion story is featured in "Latino Muslims: Our Journeys to Islam."

== See also ==
- New Muslim Cool
- Latino Muslims
- Black Muslims
- Islam in the United States
- Latin American Muslims
- Latino American Dawah Organization
