= Milwaukee Girls' Trade and Technical High School =

- Milwaukee Normal School-Milwaukee Girls' Trade and Technical High School
- U.S. National Register of Historic Places
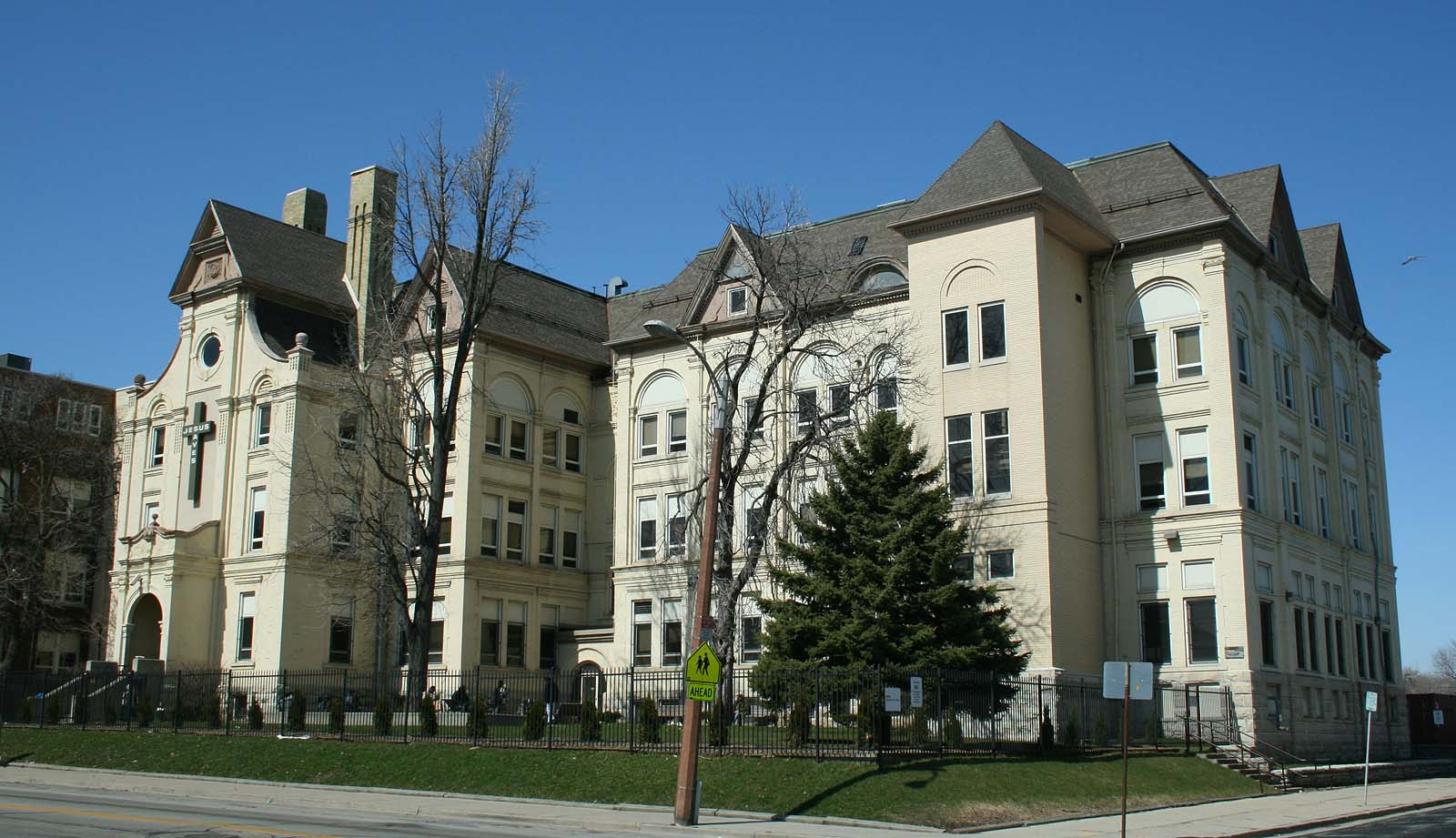
- Milwaukee Normal School-Milwaukee Girls' Trade and Technical High School
- Location: 1820 W. Wells St. Milwaukee, Wisconsin
- Built: 1885-1932
- Architect: E. Townsend Mix
- Architectural style: Queen Anne/Tudor Revival
- NRHP reference No.: 86000123
- Added to NRHP: January 16, 1986

Milwaukee Girls' Trade and Technical High School is a historic school complex located in Milwaukee, Wisconsin, United States, which housed the Milwaukee Normal School from 1885 to 1909 and the Girls' Trade and Technical High School from 1909 to 1954. The complex was added to the National Register of Historic Places in 1986.

== History ==
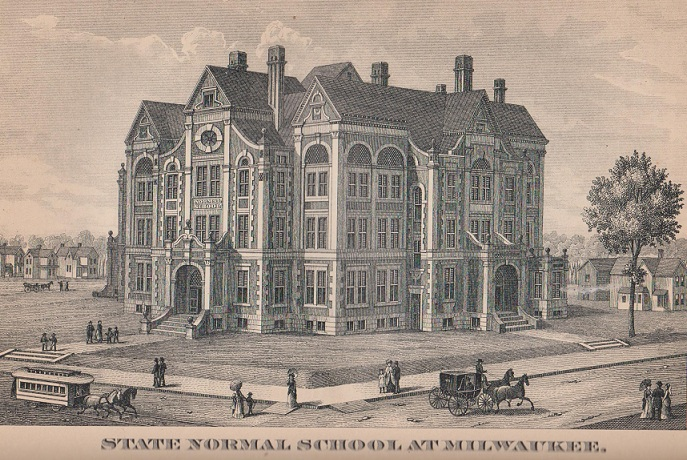
State Normal School, 1885

The site is made up of four adjoining structures built in stages. Built in 1885, the central and oldest structures of the complex are the former State Normal School (later the Wisconsin State College of Milwaukee and now the University of Wisconsin–Milwaukee), with the central section a Queen Anne design by master-architect E. Townsend Mix. The second structure was built in 1894 on the west side of the original school, with a similar design. This "normal school" was the fifth public teacher training school in the state, and was a valuable complement to Marquette and Concordia universities, which lacked teacher training programs. In 1909, the normal school moved to Downer and Kenwood, and eventually evolve into UW-Milwaukee.

The Milwaukee Public Schools bought the old normal school building and converted it to the Girls' Trade and Technical High School. This progressive school was an achievement of Lizzie Black Kander and Milwaukee's Social Democrats. Kander wanted young women to be equipped with skills which would get them gainful employment instead of menial jobs. The initial courses of study were dressmaking and millinery. In 1919, classes were added in shorthand, touch-typing, bookkeeping, and business calculations. The school complex was expanded in 1918 with a Tudor-Gothic wing designed by Van Ryn & DeGelleke, and again in 1932 in a similar style. After WWII enrollment declined as families wanted a broader education for their daughters, and the trade school was converted in 1955 to the Wells Street Junior High.

The junior high operated until 1979. In 1982, the complex was sold and converted to the Milwaukee Rescue Mission, a homeless shelter.
