= We Are Poets =

2012 British documentary film

- Directed by: Daniel Lucchesi and Alex Ramseyer-Bache
- Edited by: David Smith
- Music by: Samuel Sim, The Pattern Theory, Tom Stewart, Bob Bradley
- Production company: The Northern Film School at Leeds Metropolitan University
- Release date: 2012
- Running time: 84 minutes
- Country: United Kingdom
- Language: English

We Are Poets is a 2012 British documentary film directed by Daniel Lucchesi and Alex Ramseyer-Bache. It follows six young poets from Leeds Young Authors performance poetry group in Leeds on their visit to the international Poetry Slam Competition in Washington, D.C., United States. Leeds Young Authors was founded by poet Khadijah Ibrahiim.

It premièred at the Doc/Fest film festival in Sheffield's Showroom Cinema on 11 June 2011, where it won the Sheffield Youth Jury Award.

== Cast ==
- Khadijah Ibrahiim as herself
- Azalia Anisko as herself (poet)
- Genya Anisko as herself (Azalia's mum)
- Rheima Ibrahiim as herself (poet)
- Kadish Morris as herself (poet)
- Paulette Morris as herself (co-director, Leeds Young Authors)
- Saju Ahmed as himself (poet)
- Maryam Alam as herself (poet)
- Joseph Buckley as himself (poet)
- Saul Williams as himself (poet/musician)
- Rommi Smith as herself (poet coach)
- Ise Lyfe as hiumself (hip hop theatre artist)

== Reception ==
Peter Bradshaw wrote in The Guardian: "Reality TV gives the impression that egomania, humiliating losers and wittering on about your personal journey are essential factors in the process of nurturing talent. This refreshing documentary offers another way of thinking. It follows the work of Leeds Young Authors, a performance-poetry group for teenagers in the toughest parts of the city. Six of them are chosen to represent the UK in a US Poetry Slam in Washington DC, and the film-makers come along for the ride; they show young people who are very idealistic and fervently committed to poetry, drawing on the energies of rap, hip-hop and stand-up comedy. Perhaps nothing in the film quite matches the slo-mo sequence at the very beginning, but this is a worthwhile record."
