= School of Cinema at San Francisco State University =

SFSU School of Cinema
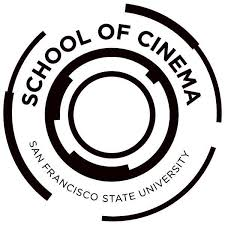
- Established: 1967
- Academic staff: 23
- Students: 950
- Undergraduates: 900
- Postgraduates: 50
- Location: San Francisco, California, United States
- Website: www.cinema.sfsu.edu

The School of Cinema is an academic unit in the College of Liberal & Creative Arts at San Francisco State University, a public research university in San Francisco. It has Bachelor of Arts, a Master of Arts, and Master of Fine Arts in cinema programs. These programs have been frequently included in the annual "Top 25 American Film Schools" rankings published by The Hollywood Reporter.

The curriculum combines film production, screenwriting, animation and critical theory in both its undergraduate and graduate programs. A wide range of courses in digital, interactive, and experimental production are offered at the school, as well as cinema history, theory, and criticism.

== History ==
The School of Cinema was founded amid the political activism and artistic experimentation of the 1960s. Originally part of the Broadcast and Electronic Arts Department, cinema faculty such as Jim Goldner successfully made the case to the university that filmmaking was both an art and industry, and that it needed to be housed in a separate department.

In the 1990s, a new facility was constructed, including a new shooting stage that expanded the department's post-production studios and labs, and beginning the transition from analogue to digital processes. A new screening room, the Coppola Theater (FA 101), equipped for both 16mm and 35mm projection and featuring a Dolby sound system, was named for former Dean of Creative Arts, August Coppola, whose efforts were primarily responsible for funding the new building. Digital upgrades to sound and editing labs have further modernized the department's production facilities.

In more recent times, filmmakers as diverse as Francis Ford Coppola and Ken Burns have given talks, master classes and screenings of their work. Alumni have also returned to the department to critique student work, to provide internships, and to continue the tradition of giving back to their community. Faculty in the department have long-standing relationships with the San Francisco Film Society and Bay Area Video Coalition, among many other San Francisco-based film production and cultural institutions.

As of November 2026, Students take classes from a diverse group of over 20 tenure-track by a tenured faculty committed to exploring all dimensions of film and media production and studies - from independent filmmaking to experimental animation to critical and cultural theory. Faculty continue to make films, write books on film and media culture, and give talks around the world on such diverse topics as Chinese cinema, digital culture, television aesthetics, experimental narrative, screenwriting and the politics of documentary film.

== Notable alumni ==
- Tory Belleci, filmmaker, special effects department
- Gloria Borders, sound engineer (Academy Award winner)
- Christopher Boyes, sound designer, Skywalker Sound (Academy Award winner)
- George Csicsery, documentary filmmaker
- Arthur Dong, documentary director, screenwriter, producer (Academy Award nominee)
- Anthony C. Ferrante, director, producer, writer
- Weston Green, digital filmmaker (Emmy Award winner, Webby honoree)
- Barbara Hammer, filmmaker (Lambda Literary Award)
- Masoud Jafari Jozani, director, screenwriter, producer
- Justin Kelly, director
- Delroy Lindo, actor, theater director
- Steven Okazaki, documentary filmmaker
- Marcy Page, producer, director
- Anthony Peckham, screenwriter, producer
- Jonas Rivera, producer, Pixar Animation Studios (Academy Award winner)
- Jay Rosenblatt, filmmaker
- Ethan Van der Ryn, sound editor (Academy Award winner)
- Steve Zaillian, screenwriter (Academy Award winner for Schindler's List)
