= New Muslim Cool =

- Directed by: Jennifer Maytorena Taylor
- Produced by: Jennifer Maytorena Taylor
- Starring: Hamza Perez
- Cinematography: David Sarasti Jon Shenk Mark Knobil
- Edited by: Kenji Yamamoto
- Music by: Chris Strollo; Soy Sos
- Release date: June 23, 2009
- Running time: 83 minutes
- Country: United States
- Language: English

New Muslim Cool is a 2009 documentary film directed and produced by Jennifer Maytorena Taylor. The film was initially released on POV and follows the life of Hamza Perez, a Puerto Rican American Rap artist who converted to Islam after he decided to quit his life as a drug dealer. Hamza spends his time on the streets and jail cells spreading the message of Islam to at-risk youth and communities. The film also features the hip-hop group M-Team, a musical collaboration between Hamza and his brother Suliman Perez. The duo utilize the medium of hip-hop to spread their faith and religious message to other young people. In the midst of his journey to establish a new religious community and a new family in the North side of Pittsburgh, Hamza is forced to face the reality of being an active Muslim in a post 9/11 America when the community's Mosque gets raided by the FBI.

== Plot ==
In the city of Pittsburgh where Hamza Perez is seen walking through the streets while narrating about his two recurring life prophecies that would come to him in dreams. One of his dreams was experiencing death at the age of 21, the second was him being in jail. Later he reveals both prophecies had come true. Hamza explains that at the age of 21 he became a Muslim, therefore he experienced a death of all his past doings. According to Hamza, one day while he was on the street smoking marijuana, a sheikh approached him to talk about Islam and that is when he knew things were going to change.

While Hamza visits his brother Suliman to cook Boricua Halal cooking (Puerto Rican Kosher cooking) the two brothers talk about their cultural hybridity and how they communicate through Arabic spanglish ebonics since they don't speak Arabic, English, or Spanish fluently. In a family gathering, Hamza and Suliman's mother Gladys expresses her hesitation about the religion since both brothers were brought up in a Catholic home and attended private Catholic school. Gladys reveals that Hamza's birth given name is Jason, and although she is still unsure about the religion Gladys has accepts the decision of her two sons. The two brothers travel to Harlem to conduct an interview for a radio station where they talk about their music and religious message. While still in New York, Hamza visits the projects where he reaches out to young since he works for a social service agency as an anti-drug counselor.

Back in Pittsburgh, Hamza begins to talk about plans to create a Mosque, school, and youth center for the newly established Muslim community. According to Hamza, many people traveled from different places to create a community away from drugs and alcohol, and to learn more about Islam. Hamza also reveals he has two children from a previous marriage and wishes to have a family again since there is no dating in Islam only marriage. In the next scene Rafiah describes how she met Hamza in a Muslim social network (naseeb.com) and decided to get married after courting through the internet. The wedding according to Hamza is a “clash of civilizations” since Hamza himself is Puerto Rican and Rafiah is African American. After the wedding Hamza and Rafiah travel to Massachusetts where she meets the rest of the family and learns more about Hamza's past as a drug dealer. When Hamza returns to Pittsburgh, he introduces the new community Mosque. Hamza also shows where the FBI has placed a hidden on a light post pointing directly towards the Mosque. Hamza continues to use his music as form of religious outreach in the streets of Pittsburgh, and explains that those who are experiencing oppression and hardship need something to relate to. Rafiah reveals she was apprehensive about Hamza's rapping career, however once listened to his music she enjoyed it. After two months of marriage Hamza and Rafiah decide to move into a new home. While preparing for a family bbq for the 4th of July Hamza expresses his worry stating that everything is going too good. Shortly after, that same day the FBI raids the new Mosque. Through news footage and an interview with a former reporter, it is established that the raid occurred on a Friday on the 4th of July during prayer hours. Hamza and other witnesses who were at the Mosque describe in detail the incident stating that the FBI forced everyone out at gunpoint. The explanation given to the media outlets to why the FBI went into the Mosque was in connection to the apprehension of an individual who had various felony charges and was staying at the Mosque for the evening. After the raid, Hamza shares his fear about being apprehended and what would become of his family.

Six months after the raid, Hamza is seen more involved in his home life since Rafiah began to work. Hamza has shifted his mentality from just an Islamic activists to a well-rounded family man following the teachings of Muhammad. Hamza has begun to closely read the word of Muhammad, giving him a new perspective in life and now seeks to collaborate with other religious groups. As part of his job, Hamza begins to teach regular classes at the county jail, dealing with various religious groups. Hamza also begins to collaborate with Carol Elkid, a Jewish woman who is part of an organization that encourages diverse groups of Jewish and Muslim youth to express themselves through poetry.

A year after the raid Rafiah is expecting a baby and the family is seen bonding over the news. Later on, the county jail abruptly revokes Hamza's security clearance along with two other Muslim clerics. Hamza is given no reason to why his clearance was revoked until months after when his attorney reveals that an interview Hamza gave before the release of an album in 2003 was brought into question. Hamza and his attorney continue to fight for his clearance. After one of the meeting with his attorney Hamza's wife goes into labor and gives birth to a baby boy. Hamza continues to work with at risk-youth and meets with an anti-drug committee at the housing projects in Pittsburgh to talk about a program for recovering drug dealers. Hamza also continues to record new tracks with his brother. The film concludes with Hamza being able to obtain his clearance to the county jail.

== Production ==
During the time Jennifer Maytorena Taylor spent teaching in Argentina and Brazil, she witnessed first hand friends and family coping with the transition of a military dictatorship to elected governments. What stood out to her was the power that pop-culture had as a coping mechanism. She realized how it helped individuals and communities from different countries to express themselves in a unique way.

Closely after 9/11, while working with PBS in the bay area, she came across what she called a “thriving Muslim hip-hop scene” in Oakland. There she came across a diverse group of Muslim men and women including converted Muslims and those who were born into the faith. The group collaborated with one another to create a culture that expressed their beliefs as Muslim while also reinforcing their “American-ness.” Jennifer made the connection with the young adults she met in Oakland with what she experienced in Argentina and Brazil a decade before. She discovered that both communities used pop-culture to cope with post traumatic events. Initially when Jennifer arranged her production team, their plan was to produce a survey-like film on the up-and-coming American-Muslim culture involving a group of young adults working alongside a small Muslim hip-hop label. It was going to follow the way that these young adults would utilize their resources to spread their faith and pop-culture.

When the production decided to focus on Hamza and his family's day-to-day life, the film took a different route. “Part of the magic of making a long-form documentary is not knowing where it will end up. Inevitably, though, you discover you’ve been profoundly changed, for the better, by the journey,” quotes Jennifer in her statement for the film on her POV filmmaker statement.

Su'ad Abdul Khabeer, an artist and academic whose work focuses on the intersections of race and ethnicity in America and later wrote a book called Muslim Cool: Race, Religion and Hip Hop in the United States examining the relationship of Hip Hop and American Muslims, was a senior project advisor on the film.

=== Cast ===
- Hamza Perez (Rap Artist/Activist)
- Suliman Perez (Brother)
- Gladys Perez (Mother)
- Rafiah Daughtry (Wife)

=== Funding ===
The film was funded by Latino Public Broadcasting, Ford Foundation, National Endowment for the Arts, Nathan Cummings Foundation, Sundance Documentary Fund, Center for Asian American Media, LEF Foundation, Anthony Radziwill Fund/Independent Feature Project, Wallace Alexander Gerbode Foundation, Hartley Film Foundation, Paul Robeson Fund, and the Nu Lambda Trust.

=== Release ===
New Muslim Cool premiered on PBS June 23, 2009. It is currently streaming on Hulu and Netflix.

=== Awards/Festivals ===
Featured on PBS television series POV as the Opening Night Selection. Received the Freedom award at the Al Jazeera International Film Festival Nominated for the San Francisco International Film Festival in 2009 Was a selection for the Rooftop Film Festival and the Lincoln Center Independents Night, co-sponsored by Human Rights Watch Film Festival.

=== Reception ===
Bakari Kitwana from The Huffington Post stated that the film New Muslim Cool gives the audience a glimpse of a new generation of Americans with intricate interweaving identities calling it a “journey full of collisions -- mainly because the very act of shining a spotlight on the ways race, politics, religion and generational rifts have evolved.”

Jonathan Curiel from the San Francisco Chronicle stated that by the end of New Muslim Cool, the audience is able to experience the difficulty of being a young Muslim in America.

Ginia Bellafante from The New York Times states that, “New Muslim Cool possesses a kind of beauty that sneaks up on you, ” and “the film is an opportunity to access a closer view of human decency.”

== See also ==
- Latino Muslims
- Hamza Perez
