= Documentary mode =

Conceptual scheme detailing the types of documentary films

Documentary mode is a conceptual scheme developed by American documentary theorist Bill Nichols that seeks to distinguish particular traits and conventions of various documentary film styles. Nichols identifies six different documentary 'modes' in his schema: poetic, expository, observational, participatory, reflexive, and performative. While Nichols' discussion of modes does progress chronologically with the order of their appearance in practice, documentary film often returns to themes and devices from previous modes. Therefore, it is inaccurate to think of modes as historical punctuation marks in an evolution towards an ultimate accepted documentary style. Also, modes are not mutually exclusive. There is often significant overlapping between modalities within individual documentary features. As Nichols points out, "the characteristics of a given mode function as a dominant in a given film…but they do not dictate or determine every aspect of its organization." (Nichols 2001)

== Nichols' documentary modes ==
=== Poetic mode ===
Early documentary filmmakers, bolstered by Soviet montage theory and the French Impressionist cinema principle of photogenie, appropriated these techniques into documentary filmmaking to create what Nichols would later call the poetic mode. Documentary pioneer Dziga Vertov came remarkably close to describing the mode in his "We: Variant of a Manifesto" when he proclaimed that "kinochestvo" (the quality of being cinematic) is "the art of organizing the necessary movements of objects in space as a rhythmical artistic whole, in harmony with the properties of the material and internal rhythm of each object." (Michelson, O’Brien, & Vertov 1984)

The poetic mode of documentary film tends toward subjective interpretations of its subject(s). Light on rhetoric, documentaries in the poetic mode forsake traditional narrative content: individual characters and events remain undeveloped, in favor of creating a particular mood or tone. This is particularly noticeable in the editing of poetic documentaries, where continuity is of virtually no consequence at all. Rather, poetic editing explores "associations and patterns that involve temporal rhythms and spatial juxtapositions." (Nichols 2001) Joris Ivens’ Regen (1929) is paradigmatic of the poetic mode, consisting of unrelated shots linked together to illustrate a rain shower in Amsterdam. That the poetic mode illustrates such subjective impressions with little or no rhetorical content, it is often perceived as avant-garde, and subsequent pieces in this mode (Godfrey Reggio’s Koyaanisqatsi (1982) for example,) are likely to be found within that realm.

=== Expository mode ===
Documentary forefather John Grierson offers an explanation for the move away from poetic documentary, claiming filmmakers, "got caught up in social propaganda …We got on to the social problems of the world, and we ourselves deviated from the poetic line." (Sussex 1972) The expositional mode diverges sharply from the poetic mode in terms of visual practice and story-telling devices, by virtue of its emphasis on rhetorical content, and its goals of information dissemination or persuasion.

Narration is a distinct innovation of the expositional mode of documentary. Initially manifesting as an omnipresent, omniscient, and objective voice intoned over footage, narration holds the weight of explaining and arguing a film’s rhetorical content. Where documentary in the poetic mode thrived on a filmmaker’s aesthetic and subjective visual interpretation of a subject, expositional mode collects footage that functions to strengthen the spoken narrative. This shift in visual tactics gives rise to what Nichols refers to as "evidentiary editing," a practice in which expositional images "...illustrate, illuminate, evoke, or act in counterpoint to what is said…[we] take our cue from the commentary and understand the images as evidence or demonstration…" (Nichols 2001: 107) The engagement of rhetoric with supporting visual information founded in the expositional mode continues today and, indeed, makes up the bulk of documentary product. Film features, news stories, and various television programs lean heavily on its utility as a device for transferring information.

=== Participatory mode ===
In the participatory mode "the filmmaker does interact with his or her subjects rather than unobtrusively observe them." This interaction is present within the film; the film makes explicit that meaning is created by the collaboration or confrontation between filmmaker and contributor. Jean Rouch's Chronicle of a Summer, 1960, is an early manifestation of participatory filmmaking. At its simplest this can mean the voice of the filmmaker(s) is heard within the film. As Nichols explains "what happens in front of the camera becomes an index of the nature of interaction between filmmaker and subject." According to Nichols (2010), in the participatory mode of documentaries, “the filmmaker becomes a social actor (almost) like any other (almost because the filmmaker retains the camera and with it a degree of potential power and control over events)” (p. 139.) Through interviews, the filmmaker’s voice is shown as it combines contributing material about the story that they are trying to tell. An example of this is the machine invented by Errol Morris called the Interrotron. This machine allows for the subject to engage with the director directly while still being able to look into the lens of the camera.

=== Observational mode ===
The observational mode of documentary developed in the wake of documentarians returning to Vertovian ideals of truth, along with the innovation and evolution of cinematic hardware in the 1960s. In Dziga Vertov's Kino-Eye manifestoes, he declared, "I, a camera, fling myself along…maneuvering in the chaos of movement, recording movement, startling with movements of the most complex combinations." (Michelson, O’Brien, & Vertov 1984) The move to lighter 16mm equipment and shoulder mounted cameras allowed documentarians to leave the anchored point of the tripod. Portable Nagra sync-sound systems and unidirectional microphones, too, freed the documentarian from cumbersome audio equipment. A two-person film crew could now realize Vertov’s vision and sought to bring real truth to the documentary milieu.

Unlike the subjective content of poetic documentary, or the rhetorical insistence of expositional documentary, observational documentaries tend to simply observe, allowing viewers to reach whatever conclusions they may deduce. Pure observational documentarians proceeded under some bylaws: no music, no interviews, no scene arrangement of any kind, and no narration. The fly-on-the-wall perspective is championed, while editing processes use long takes and few cuts. Resultant footage appears as though the viewer is witnessing first-hand the experiences of the subject: they travel with Bob Dylan to England in D.A. Pennebaker's Dont Look Back [sic] (1967,) suffer the stark treatment of patients at the Bridgewater State Hospital in Frederick Wiseman's Titicut Follies (1967,) and hit the campaign trail with John F. Kennedy and Hubert Humphrey in Robert Drew’s Primary (1960.)

=== Reflexive mode ===
The reflexive mode considers the quality of documentary itself, de-mystifying its processes and considering its implications. It also includes filmmakers within the film. In Dziga Vertov’s Man with a Movie Camera (1929,) for example, he features footage of his brother and wife in the process of shooting footage and editing, respectively. The goal in including these images was, "to aid the audience in their understanding of the process of construction in film so that they could develop a sophisticated and critical attitude." (Ruby 2005) Mitchell Block’s ...No Lies (1974,) functioned in a notably different manner, as it reflexively and critically questioned the observational mode, commenting on observational techniques and their capacity for capturing authentic truths. In this way, the reflexive mode of documentary often functions as its own regulatory board, policing ethical and technical boundaries within documentary film itself.

The technique of using reenactment is an aspect of the reflexive mode of documentary. Allowing the director to show the audience their vision, or help visualize the vision of the interview subject of a particular event is direct communication with the audience. Errol Morris implemented the use of reenactment footage in the documentary "The Thin Blue Line" where Morris visualized the events of a man who was falsely accused of the killing of a police officer. Because there was no actual footage of the events that took place, Morris felt it was best to incorporate visual aids to help the audience have a better understanding of the situation. Although reenactments can be an important tool to use for a director to incorporate their vision, it heavily strays away from the Cinéma vérité style of documentary and is frowned upon by some documentary purists.

=== Performative mode ===
The performative mode, the final mode Nichols discusses, is easily confused with the participatory mode, and Nichols remains somewhat nebulous about their distinctions. The crux of the difference seems to lie in the fact that where the participatory mode engages the filmmaker to the story but attempts to construct truths that should be self-evident to anyone, the performative mode engages the filmmaker to the story but constructs subjective truths that are significant to the filmmaker themself. Deeply personal, the performative mode is particularly well-suited to telling the stories of filmmakers from marginalized social groups, offering the chance to air unique perspectives without having to argue the validity of their experiences, as in Marlon Riggs’ 1990 documentary Tongues Untied about his experiences as a gay black dancer in New York City. The departure from a rhetoric of persuasion allows the performative film a great deal more room for creative freedom in terms of visual abstraction, narrative, etc.

Stella Bruzzi (2000), by contrast, holds a broader view of the performative mode. Inspired by J. L. Austin’s notion of the performative, which Nichols avoids, Bruzzi argues that documentary films are by default performative because they are “inevitably the result of the intrusion of the filmmaker onto the situation being filmed.” In particular, Bruzzi considers documentaries that foreground the “artificialisation by the camera” perfect examples of the performative mode. Hongjian Wang (2016) extends the discussion of the performative mode by Nichols and Bruzzi to the “performing camera,” which documents by reenacting the subjective perspective of the subjects (not necessarily that of the filmmaker) in the documentary films. By “performing” the point of view of the subjects, the performative documentaries put the audience in the positions of the subjects. Wang further distinguishes between “the empathetic performative mode,” which prompts audience identification with the subjects, and “the critical performative mode,” which provokes the audience to feel disgusted by, angry at, and critical about the subjects.

With the filmmaker visible to the viewer and free to openly discuss their perspective in regard to the film being made, rhetoric and argumentation return to the documentary film as the filmmaker clearly asserts a message. Notable directors in this documentary mode include Michael Moore.

The performative mode is also manifested in ethnographic film, such as "Incidents of Travel in Chichen Itza" by Jeff Himpele and Quetzil Castaneda. In this visual ethnography of cultural event of the spring equinox involving new age tourism at a sacred Maya site in Mexico, the ethnographers both document the event and provide an ethnographic questioning of the meanings that are projected on the physical heritage objects that attract 50,000 tourists to the equinox at Chichen. In this film, unlike the performative documentaries of Michael Moore in which there is a specific take away message and argument, the ethnographic filmmakers create an open-ended, polyphonic film in which the audience is provided greater opportunity to define the meanings, messages, and understandings of what the film represents. In general, documentaries, especially educational documentaries are scripted such that the audience is persuaded to accept a specific lesson or message, the performative mode of documentary is used to break from a monological or monotone understanding not only through the use of dialogical principles of dialogical anthropology, but of experimental ethnography. The Himpele and Castaneda therefore create an ethnographic documentary that expands the idea of experimental ethnography as a set of principles for writing a text to producing and postproducing ethnographic film.

== Documentary modes and narrative structure ==
In her book Looking Two Ways (1996), Toni de Bromhead criticises Nichols for his focus on documentary as a rational discourse. She claims that documentary reaches for "hearts and souls not just minds" and that central to documentary story telling is "emotional response and empathy". She contrasts Nichols’ rational journalistic view with what she refers to as the cinematic qualities of documentary. For her, the cinematic is experiential, emotive, expressive and celebrates subjectivity. While the journalistic view focuses on analysis, learning, information and objectivity. The cinematic uses creative cinematic devices, values the expression of opinion, foregrounds the point of view of the filmmaker and creative treatment is expected. On the other hand the journalistic, rational approach is founded upon checkable facts, has recourse to experts and eye witness testimony, the validity of filmmakers opinion is questioned and creative treatment rejected.

De Bromhead wants to move away from problems of "objectivity and truth" and focus on issues of narrative and its "relationship to the represented". She understands that documentary’s "claim to the real" is subjective i.e. that it can never be truly objective, that it is always mediated by the subjectivity of the filmmaker. In doing so De Bromhead makes a case for a kind of documentary storytelling that cannot be constructed through words alone but weaves together image, sound, action and structure to produce meaning. She says that in contrast to Nichols, whose position appears to be that documentary is first and foremost informative, the real aim of documentary story telling is filmic pleasure. The story for her is an interplay between the filmic self and objective world as mediated by the filmmaker. De Bromhead presents her own ‘modes’ of documentary. Where Nichols concerns are broad and include history, style, technology & practice. Her concern is purely with properties of narrative structure. For example she states that; "observational is not a narrative form but a narrative style".

== De Bromhead’s documentary modes ==
=== Linear mode ===
Classic or Hollywood storytelling; character-based, follows standard three-act structure, based around conflict and resolution as a storytelling arc. Examples: Primary (1960) - Drew and Leacock.
Detective storytelling; the story is based around the process of an investigation and the obstacles faced by the filmmaker. In some cases the failure to make the film becomes the story of the film. Examples: Films by Michael Moore & Nick Broomfield.

=== Discursive mode ===
Discursive storytelling; gives priority to information, facts and logic, typical of current affairs documentaries, political documentaries, may give more space to cinematic concerns than purely journalistic filmmaking, often utilizes archive footage to illustrate the story. Examples: The War On Democracy (2007) - John Pilger & Rosie the Riveter (1980) – Connie Field.

=== Episodic mode ===
Episodic storytelling; which juxtaposes situations that have no narrative or causal relations, meaning is produced by the juxtaposition of the episodes, often ordered around one dominant theme or idea (e.g. the seasons). Examples: Nanook of the North (1922) - Robert Flaherty & Hospital (1970) - Frederick Wiseman.

=== Poetic mode ===
Poetic storytelling; is built up around audio visual poetic associations, films avoid following a specific storyline or conventional narrative logic, utilizes similar structures to poetry such as metaphor and disjunction. Examples: Listen to Britain (1942) - Humphrey Jennings & Rain (1929) - Joris Ivans.

=== Hybrid mode ===
The Diary Film; the linear logic of passing time is used to structure the narrative in either linear or episodic form. Examples: Tarnation (2003) - Jonathan Caouette.
The Road Movie; the linear logic of a physical journey is used to structure the narrative in either linear or episodic form. Examples: Don’t Look Back (1966) - D.A. Pennebaker.

== Documentary modes and interactive storytelling ==
Research into the recent and rapid evolution of the documentary genre has recently started to recognise interactive documentary or ‘iDocs’ as a field of distinct practice. In 2012, the journal ‘Studies in Documentary’ devoted an entire issue to a debate on the subject and in doing so the journal attempted to frame the debate and ask questions about this new field of study.

A broad definition of interactive documentary would include any attempt to document the real that utilises digital technology and forms of interactivity either in the form of delivery technology or through production processes. Aston & Gaudenzi (2012) argue that in fact interactive documentaries are not the result of a linear evolution of the documentary genre. But a distinct and separate mode of practice that goes beyond simple representation of the real, moving towards one that constructs the real through an immersive and enacted user experience.

While it is generally accepted that Aston & Gaudenzi's (2012) formulation is still contested, its usefulness lies in that the discussion emerges as a response to Nichols (1992) and de Bromhead's (2009) debate on the subject of documentary modes of representation. Such a trajectory offers a clear historical relationship to the notion of a documentary tradition and provides a basis for describing a boundary around these new formations of practice.

Aston & Gaudenzi (2012) offer four modes for understanding the nature of interactive documentary; the conversational mode as a conversation with a computer that is typified through forms of game-play, the hypertext mode as means of structuring user experience through a series of branching choices; the participative mode as two-way conversation between author and users that actively involves the user in production of material; the experiential mode as a way of utilising space and embodiment to structure the user experience particularly where the experience of the real and the virtual become blurred.
