= Incidents of Travel in Chichen Itza =

Incidents of Travel in Chichén Itzá is an ethnographic film (ethnographic documentary). Jeff Himpele and Quetzil E. Castañeda, filmmakers and producers. Production 1995 and 1997. Postproduction release: 1997.

This ethnographic film can be considered as a combination of the documentary film styles that Bill Nichols calls the participatory and the performative modes. While shooting the film, the filmmakers emphasized techniques of cinéma verité as pioneered in anthropological films by Jean Rouch. It has become a classic film text in the anthropology of tourism for its portrayal of the economic, social, cultural and political conflicts surrounding a major international tourism destination based on archaeological heritage. It is also a classic in the anthropology of religion and used as a vivid ethnographic account of New Age spiritualists and their practices.

== Film Locations ==
This ethnographic film was shot entirely on location at the archaeological and tourism site of Chichén Itzá and the nearby Maya Indian community of Pisté, Yucatán, México, during the spring equinox of 1995 and 1997. The film was shot during the equinox event at Chichen Itza and includes interviews and footage with New Age Spiritualists, State archaeology authorities, secular tourists, artisans, venders, local political leaders.

== Ethnographic Analysis of the Spring Equinox at Chichen Itza ==
The equinox event is a state-sponsored tourism ritual and celebration of the Maya. In 1928 after reconstructing the main pyramid of Chichén Itzá, which is called the Castillo (or Castle) and the Pyramid of Kukulcan, archaeologists noticed a peculiar phenomena involving the setting sun and the pyramid. Specifically, the setting sun casts shadow of the northwest corner of the pyramid onto the balustrade of the north staircase. Beginning in 1974 this began to be interpreted as the symbolic descent of K'uk'ulcan. The name of this god is often translated as Feathered Serpent but is a literal rendition in Maya of the Nahuatl name Quetzalcoatl.

Beginning in 1984 the State Government of Yucatán, Mexico, in collaboration with the federal National Institute of Anthropology and History, began to develop a tourist ritual celebration that included traditional Yucatec dance called Jarana, reconstructed pre-columbian dances and music, classical Yucatec guitar trios and an explanation of the equinox phenomenon according to the most prevalent and dominant archaeoastronomical interpretation. Performers included both professionals and student groups ranging in age from children to adult dance and music groups throughout the state. It was a general celebration of Maya and Yucatecan cultures.

Following the first nationally televised vernal equinox in 1984 and the publications of new age maya books such as José Argüelles, The Mayan Factor, this event began to attract various types of new age religious groups, including contemporary Mexican Gnostics, Aztec Revivialists, US New Age Spiritualists, and other fringe sects.
See https://www.flickr.com/photos/der/211080687/in/photostream/
Sources: Quetzil Castaneda, Chapter 6, "Vernal Return and Cosmos: That Serpent on the Balustrade and the New Age Invasion." In the Museum of Maya Culture, 1996.

== Description of the Ethnographic Film ==
This original ethnographic video depicts how New Agers, the Mexican state, tourists, and 1920s archaeologists all contend to “clear” the site of the antique Maya city of Chichen Itza in order to produce their own idealized and unobstructed visions of “Maya” while the local Maya themselves struggle to occupy the site as vendors and artisans.

The setting is the spring Equinox when a shadow said to represent the Maya serpent-god Kukulkan appears on one temple pyramid. As more than 40,000 New Age spiritualists and secular tourists from the United States and Mexico converge to witness this solar phenomenon, the video depicts the surrounding social event as a complicated entanglement of expected dualisms concerning tourism. Going beyond previous films that reduce tourism to neo-colonial and exoticizing social relations, this video portrays a Maya cultural site where US New Agers — rather than local Mayas — appear as exotic ritualists who are on display for other secular tourists and for local Mayas.

While the video does examine representations of Mayas by visiting New Agers as part of globalizing discourses on the exotic and evolution, it also shows how during the ongoing economic crisis resident Mayas struggle against the Mexican state — rather than against tourists — that regularly “sweeps” them from the tourist zone in order to anchor the nation in an image of pure antiquity.

This video also asks what kind of fieldwork is possible at such a spectacle and it questions the status of ethnographic authority as people from the various groups converging on the event, including the anthropologist-videomakers, ironically trade positions as well as compete to speak about the Maya.

Luis Vivanco analyzes the ethnographic film as an example of cinéma verité filmmaking among anthropological and documentary films. Vivanco also discusses the film's portrayal of religious pilgrimage for its contribution to the anthropological study of tourism, heritage, and travel. (See L. Vivanco, "Performative Pilgrims and the Shifting Grounds of Anthropological Documentary" In Representing Religion in World Cinema (2003) edited by S. Brent Plate and published by Palgrave MacMillan, pgs. 159-177).

== Film Festivals, Screenings, Awards ==
- Society for Visual Anthropology Film Festival, Award 1997
- Margaret Mead Festival, 1997
- Royal Anthropological Institute, Material Culture and Archaeology Prize, 1998
- Latin American Studies Association Film Festival, (Washington DC) 2001
- Latin American Studies Association, selection September 2001
