= Pam Sporn =

Bronx-based filmmaker and teacher)

Pam Sporn is a filmmaker and teacher. Her documentaries have won several film festival awards.

== Career ==
Her work has covered such topics as Cuban cigar rollers, an annual dance, and the story of a family that emigrated from Cuba to the United States, as well as "homelessness, teen pregnancy and police brutality."

== Films ==
- "Disobeying Orders: GI Resistance to the Vietnam War"
- "Cuban Roots, Bronx Stories"
- "Con El Toque de la Chavetta" ("With the Stroke of the Chavetta")
- "Recordando El Mamoncillo" ("Remembering the Mamoncillo Tree")
- "Detroit 48202: Conversations Along a Postal Route"

== Awards ==
- 1997 BRIO award
- 2007 BRIO award
- 2008 Cine Las Americas International Film Festival's Jury Award for Best Documentary Short for "Con El Toque de la Chavetta" ("With the Stroke of the Chavetta")
- 2010 BRIO award
