= Big Enough (film) =

- Directed by: Jan Krawitz
- Produced by: Jan Krawitz
- Cinematography: Thomas Ott, Ferne Pearlstein
- Music by: Kim Falk
- Release date: 2004
- Country: United States
- Language: English

Big Enough is a 2004 documentary film about Anu Trombino, Karla and John Lizzo, Len and Lenette Sawisch, and Sharon and Ron Roskamp, who are all typical Americans in every respect, except that they are dwarfs. Twenty years after her first film, Jan Krawitz finds out what has happened to her subjects.

Big Enough was met with high critical acclaim, receiving an Independent Filmmaker Award from the Carolina Film & Video Festival and was aired as part of PBS's Point of View series in 2005.
