= Milwaukee 53206 =

- Directed by: Keith McQuirter
- Produced by: Keith McQuirter, Katie Taber
- Cinematography: Derek Wiesehahn
- Edited by: Jason Pollard, Paul Lovelace
- Music by: Timothy Bright
- Production companies: Transform Films, Inc
- Release date: 2016
- Running time: 55 minutes
- Country: United States
- Language: English

Milwaukee 53206 is a feature documentary directed and produced by Keith McQuirter. The film explores the impact of mass incarceration on families in the ZIP Code 53206 in Milwaukee, Wisconsin, an area that, at the time of production, had one of the highest incarceration rate for African American men in the United States.

Through the stories of three residents, the documentary explores the effect that mass incarceration has on individuals and families in Milwaukee's ZIP code 53206, an area with one of the highest incarceration rates for African American men in the United States. The film uses this local lens to illuminate the broader, national impact of mass incarceration on communities across the country.

== Synopsis ==
The film centers on families grappling with the long-term effects of incarceration. Among the stories is Beverly Walker, a mother of five whose husband, Baron Walker, has spent more than two decades behind bars. Chad Wilson, a young man recently released from prison, works to rebuild his life while confronting the stigma and obstacles of reentry. Dennis Walton, co-director of Milwaukee's Fatherhood Initiative, draws from his own experience in the justice system to lead community efforts that support men, parents, and families affected by incarceration. In a neighborhood deeply impacted by incarceration, Dennis fights to strengthen the 53206 community against overwhelming odds.

== Release and broadcast ==
The film premiered in 2016 and later aired nationally on the PBS series America ReFramed via the WORLD Channel. On November 17, 2016, Milwaukee 53206 was screened on Capitol Hill for members of Congress and their staff.

== Awards ==
- Winner Best Documentary, Urbanworld Film Festival (2017)

== Impact ==
Milwaukee 53206 raised awareness of Wisconsin’s parole system by highlighting the case of Baron Walker, who was sentenced in 1996 to 60 years for being party to two armed robberies in which no one was physically harmed. Although eligible for parole, Walker was denied release seven times under changing state policies. Attorney Craig Mastantuono, after learning about Baron Walker's case, took it on pro bono and filed a post-conviction motion to modify his sentence. Walker was released in August 2018 after serving more than 22 years in prison.

== See also ==
- Mass incarceration in the United States
- Criminal justice reform in the United States
- Truth-in-sentencing
- Parole in the United States
- Racial inequality in the United States
- America ReFramed
