= Sheffield DocFest =

Documentary festival in Sheffield, England

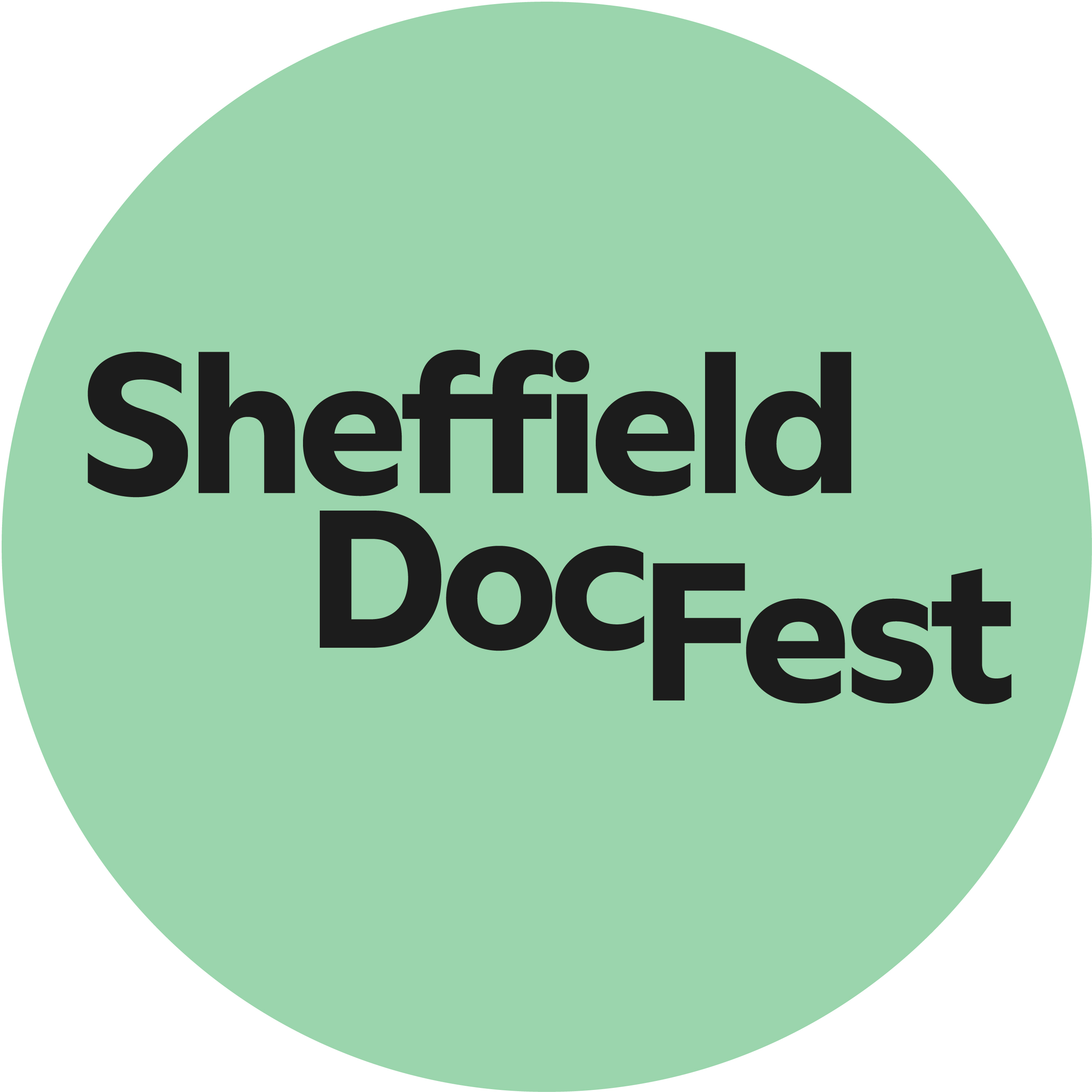
- Opening film: Tish (2023)
- Location: Sheffield, England
- Founded: 1994
- Awards: Sheffield DocFest Awards
- Directors: Mimi Poskitt, Managing Director & Raul Niño Zambrano, Creative Director
- No. of films: 122 (2023) (86 features) (36 shorts)
- Festival date: 18 June 2025 to 23 June 2025
- Website: sheffdocfest.com

Sheffield DocFest (formerly styled Sheffield Doc/Fest; abbr.Sheffield International Documentary Festival or SIDF) is an international documentary festival and industry marketplace held annually in Sheffield, England.

The festival revolves around film screenings, interactive and virtual reality exhibitions, talks & sessions, marketplace and talent for the funding and distribution of documentaries and development of filmmakers, live events, and its own awards.

Since its beginning in 1994, DocFest has become the UK's biggest documentary festival and the third largest in the world. Public service broadcaster BBC have described it as "one of the leading showcases of documentary films".

== Description ==
Over the years, the festival has been held at more than 20 other venues across Sheffield and the surrounding area, including the Light Cinema, Sheffield Town Hall, Sheffield City Hall, and the DocFest Exchange on Tudor Square, developed with the Wellcome Trust. Fun is a key element, and the festival holds many parties. The festival has gained popularity steadily over recent years. DocFest screenings help many films to achieve a wider audience by attracting distribution and further screening opportunities for the films it shows.

Sheffield DocFest's "Marketplace & Talent" segment is a major part of the festival, which includes the MeetMarket for films and series to achieve funding and distribution, "Alternate Realities Market" for interactive and virtual reality projects, live pitches, and other training initiatives.

Interactive, immersive and virtual reality documentary is also a central element of the festival with interactive exhibitions and commissioned works scattered across the city, and the Alternate Realities Summit taking place over an entire day of the festival.

In addition to the festival days in June, Sheffield DocFest presents year-round workshops, screenings, labs and mentoring opportunities both in the UK and internationally.

== History ==
In 1990, Peter Symes of BBC TV Features Bristol had the idea of creating a forum for British documentary filmmakers to debate and discuss their craft. In 1993, he set up a festival board which included representatives from Channel 4, United Artists, Discovery Channel, Central Independent Television and Granada Television. They chose to hold the festival in Sheffield, an English industrial town which was just beginning to develop a media and cultural sector.

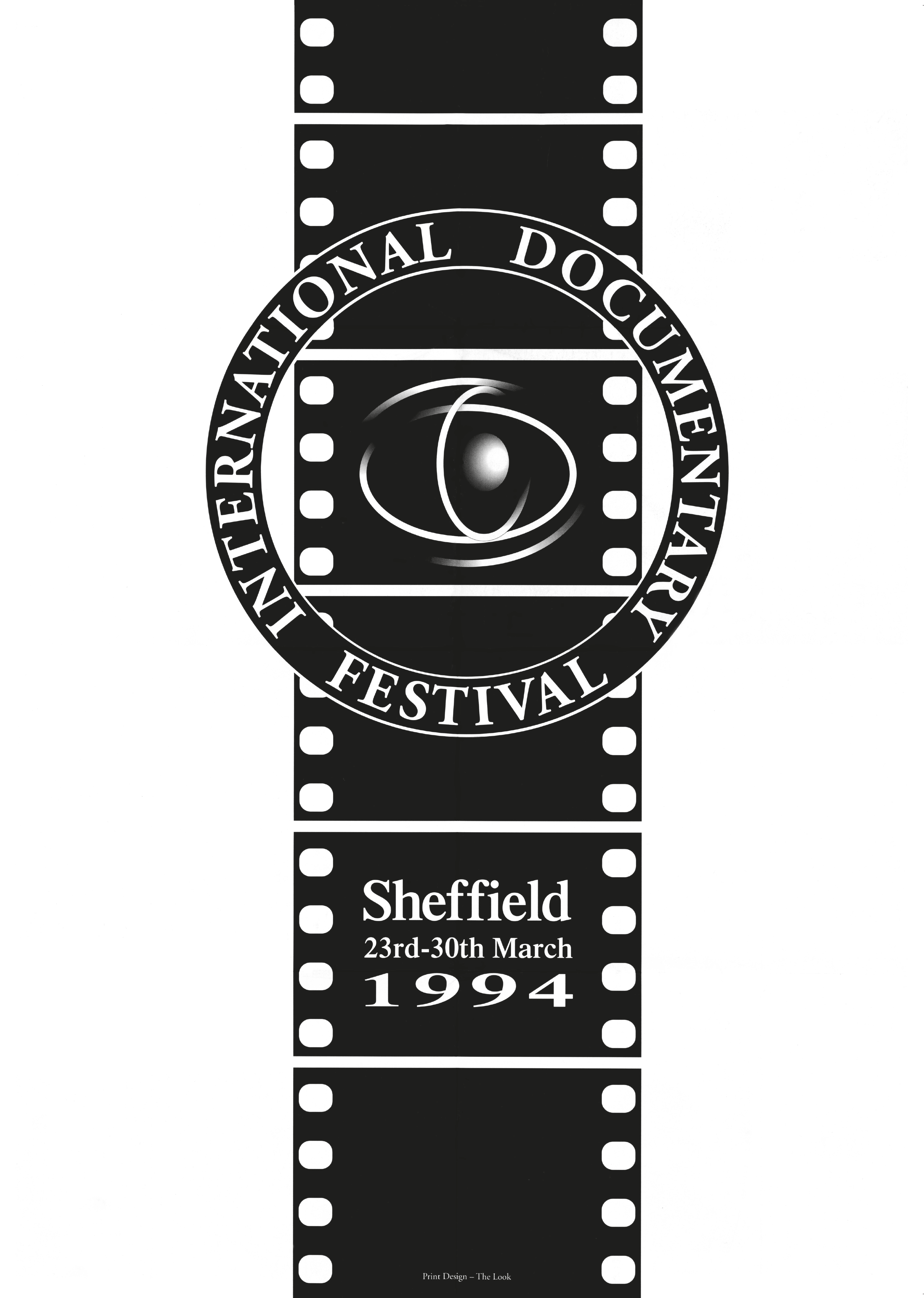
Front-side of the promotional poster for the inaugural edition of Sheffield DocFest.

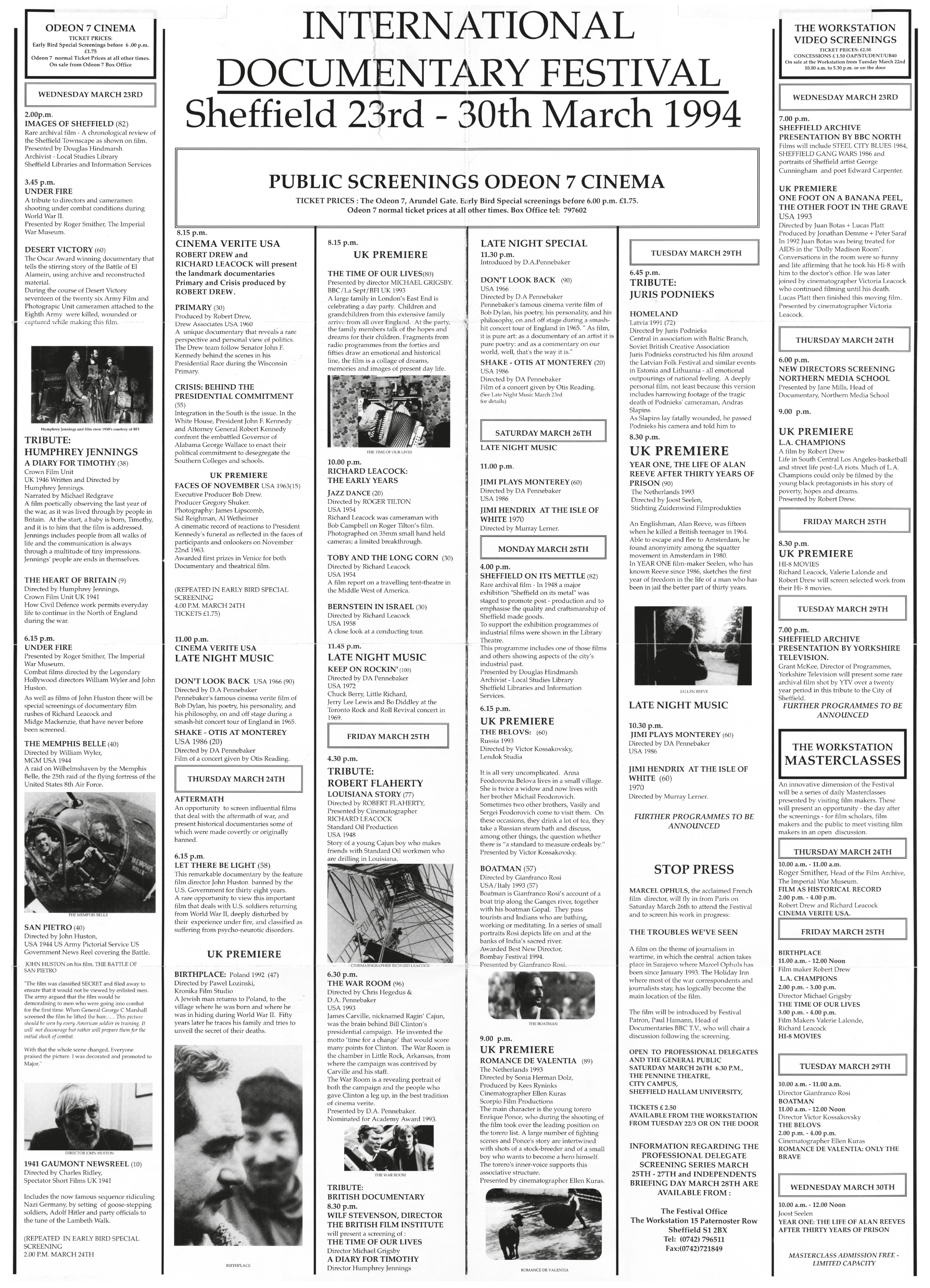
Reverse-side of the promotional poster for the inaugural edition of Sheffield DocFest, showing the full festival programme of screenings and events.

The first Sheffield International Documentary Festival was held in 1994, formatted as an international film festival and conference for documentary professionals. It included a film programme, one or two masterclasses, and a party. It lasted two days and mainly attracted London-based filmmakers and producers, plus several international commissioners and distributors.

Over the next eight years, the festival continued, with around 475 to 700 delegates attending, and total audiences reaching around 2000. The Festival became an opportunity for London-based independent filmmakers to talk to commissioners at the BBC and Channel 4, who were otherwise difficult to reach. Success at the Festival might mean landing a job for the coming year.

In 2005, DocFest attracted more than 600 mostly UK delegates and enjoyed almost 9,000 screening and session admissions. However, with changes in the factual television marketplace, it was time for DocFest to move from a primarily craft-based event and increase its marketplace activity. The chairman at the time, Steve Hewlett, visited the Australian International Documentary Conference (AIDC) where he met its director Heather Croall, who had a background in filmmaking and had founded the cross-platform storytelling event DigiDocs. He invited Croall to come and work for the festival, where she was subsequently Festival Director and CEO until early 2015, turning around the Festival's fortunes.

The 1990s rise in international co-productions meant that British producers could no longer rely solely on one big broadcaster for their entire budget, and instead had to look abroad to piece together financing for their films. To internationalise the Festival and help filmmakers achieve this financing, Croall introduced the MeetMarket pitching forum, where filmmakers pitch their ideas to funders in one-to-one meetings. MeetMarket was developed with the help of Karolina Lidin, Marketplace Executive Producer since 2008. In 2003, she developed the very first MeetMarket with Croall at AIDC, which was later brought to Sheffield in 2006.

Croall also introduced the digital-focused Summit and Crossover Market, now Alternate Realities Talent Market, which – like the MeetMarket – pairs buyers and commissioners with game designers, technologists, producers, digital agencies and filmmakers, all looking to tell stories in the interactive realm.

In 2007, Hussain Currimbhoy joined as programmer.

DocFest was an early advocate of crowdfunding as a source of finance for documentary filmmakers, and in 2010 staged its first festival-based crowdfunding pitching event, which was also an industry first. The campaign was launched on Indiegogo with a goal to raise $25k for the Festival to help stage special events. They exceeded their target.

In 2011, the Festival moved from November to June, to better fit into the industry calendar and ensure better weather and lighter evenings for visitors.

From 2012, selected highlights from the Festival have often played at the BFI Southbank in London. The Festival began producing its own film projects, including From the Sea to the Land Beyond in 2012 and The Big Melt in 2013.

From 2014, the Festival became recognised by the Academy Awards as an Oscar-qualifying festival in the Best Documentary (Short Subject) category with the DocFest Short Doc Award Winner eligible to enter for consideration. Many DocFest Short Doc Award-winning films have gone on to be shortlisted for Oscars.

In 2014, DocFest presented films including Beyond Clueless and Love Is All at Latitude Festival, with Sigur Ros scored archive film The Show of Shows: 100 Years of Vaudeville, Circuses and Carnivals, Montage of Heck, Sounds of the Cosmos and a number of shorts also featured in 2015. This partnership continued, and in 2017 DocFest brought a selection of virtual reality projects to Latitude for the first time, alongside a curated programme of shorts.

In 2014, there were some high-level staff changes. Deputy Director Charlie Phillips left to head up the documentary arm of The Guardian, with director of Berwick Film & Media Arts Festival Melanie Iredale taking up the position. Director of Programming, Hussain Currimbhoy, left for Sundance Film Festival, with former Executive Content Adviser at Independent Television Service (ITVS) Claire Aguilar becoming Head of Programming & Industry Engagement. Croall returned to Australia to become the Artistic Director and CEO of the Adelaide Fringe.

Following Heather's departure, Crossover Labs Director Mark Atkin stepped in as acting director for the 2015 Festival, before Liz McIntyre of Discovery Networks joined as CEO & Festival Director from 1 September 2015.

During McIntyre's appointment, the Festival championed diverse and pluralist voices, inclusiveness and accessibility, for example creating a crèche service and introducing British Sign Language interpreted talks, Dementia-friendly screenings, Doc/Dinner for championing diverse talent within the industry, and the From Door to Doc scheme, affording reduced rate entry to screenings for hard-to-reach areas of Sheffield.

In 2016, there were high-level staff appointments. Luke Moody, formerly of BRITDOC (now Doc Society) joined as Director of Film Programming, replacing Head of Programming & Industry Engagement Claire Aguilar. Former Dogwoof Distribution Manager Patrick Hurley joined as Head of Marketplace & Talent, replacing Marketplace Manager Anna Parker. From BBC, Dan Tucker joined as Curator of Alternate Realities.

In 2018, following the delivery of the 25th anniversary Festival, Liz McIntyre stepped down as CEO & Festival Director. Deputy Director Melanie Iredale stepped up as Interim Director to lead the 2019 edition, whilst the organisation began the search for a new director. Following the 2019 edition, Director of Film Programming Luke Moody resigned, challenging tensions between the board and the programme's internationalism in comments made to BFI's Sight & Sound magazine.

In 2019, it was announced that the organisation had successfully applied for charitable status. After 26 years operating as a subsidiary of Sheffield Media & Exhibition Centre (SMEC), the organisation became an independent registered charity. At the same time, it was announced that Chair of the Board of Trustees, Alex Graham, would step down following more than nine years of service and that former co-director of Portuguese film festival DocLisboa, Cíntia Gil, would join the Festival as Director. Regarding the move to charitable status, Gil said "To become a charity is an opportunity that will provide us with the space for public service, both in the interest of filmmakers, artists and the public...Sheffield Doc/Fest is a festival committed to the values of freedom, social engagement and collective development of the arts, therefore the purpose of our work becomes even clearer with this new status."

Gil oversaw the curation of the 2020 Festival which was due to take place in June of that year, but was cancelled in its original form due to the COVID-19 pandemic. Some of the film programme moved to online screenings with the Festival's pitching forums, the MeetMarket and Alternate Realities Talent Market, also taking place online. The Festival also committed to hosting a series of Autumn film screenings and community engagement activities in Sheffield, when cinemas reopened in late 2020.

In 2020, the Festival appointed Alex Cooke as Chair of the Board of Trustees. Cooke is CEO & Executive Producer and one of the co-founders of Renegade Pictures. From 1997 to 2001 she was the Festival Programmer for Sheffield DocFest, programming films and masterclasses.

Despite the pressures of programming during a pandemic, the Festival returned to cinemas for its 28th edition in June 2021. Then in August 2021, it was announced that, following two years as Festival Director, Cíntia Gil had stepped down. Director of Partnerships Sylvia Bednarz acted as Interim Managing Director as the Festival moved towards planning for the 2022 edition.

Later in 2021 the Festival appointed Clare Stewart, former director of Sydney Film Festival (2007–2011) and BFI London Film Festival (2012–2018), as Interim CEO. Stewart joined to steer the 2022 Festival and work alongside the Board of Trustees to develop 'a new, long-term strategy for the Festival', which included the introduction of a new joint-leadership model, developing the roles of Managing and Creative Director to lead the Festival. Under Stewart's leadership, the Festival appointed Raul Niño Zambrano, previously Senior Film Programmer of IDFA, as Head of Film Programmes and the Festival celebrated a predominantly in-person edition following the pandemic. After the 2022 Festival, Zambrano was promoted to Acting Creative Director, as the Festival began its search for a Managing Director.

Following Stewart's term as Interim CEO, the Festival appointed Annabel Grundy, formerly of BFI, as Managing Director to work alongside Zambrano under the joint-leadership model developed by Stewart. In the weeks before the 2023 Festival, in which the organisation celebrated its 30th edition, Zambrano was promoted to the permanent role of Creative Director "following a successful year as Acting Creative Director". In February 2024, DocFest announced Mimi Poskitt as DocFest's new Managing Director.

== List of festivals ==
=== 2025 ===
The 32nd Sheffield DocFest took place between 18-23 June 2025. The Film programme comprised 116 films (82 features and 34 shorts) selected from over 2753 entries. The lineup featured 51 world premieres, 16 international premieres, eight European premieres, and 39 UK premieres from 68 countries. The latest productions joining the line up include the World Premieres of Live Aid at 40 – When Rock’N’Roll Took on the World and Trade Secret, a gripping expose of the polar bear fur trade.

=== 2023 ===
The 30th Sheffield DocFest took place between 14–19 June 2023. The Film programme comprised 122 films (86 features and 36 shorts), including 38 World Premieres, 19 International Premieres, 10 European Premieres, 47 UK Premieres and 8 retrospective films, from 52 countries of production with 43 languages represented. 15 projects were exhibited in the Alternate Realities programme, and 48 projects were presented in the MeetMarket pitching forum. The Festival expanded its offering to include a theatre production, live podcast events, as well as premieres of new TV series.

The World Premiere of Paul Sng's Tish opened the Festival at Sheffield City Hall, the film had previously pitched at the 2021 MeetMarket. The Festival also celebrated the work of renowned Iranian filmmaker Rakhshan Banietemad as Guest of Honour, screening a retrospective of her work as well as the World Premiere of her short film Narratives ad Hominem. To complement the retrospective, the Festival also screened a selection of titles which offered different perspectives on Iran, including films by Mania Akbari and Mehran Tamadon.

The Talks & Sessions programme welcomed guests such as Munya Chawawa, David Olusoga, Rose Ayling-Ellis, Laura Whitemore and David Harewood. Following the success of the 2022 talent initiative led by Asif Kapadia, the Festival welcomed filmmaker Kevin Macdonald as mentor for the Filmmaker Challenge 2023. The initiative challenged six early-career filmmakers to make a documentary in one day, drawing from the Festival's tagline for the 30th edition 'Sparking Curiosity'.

=== 2022 ===
The 29th Sheffield DocFest took place between 23–28 June 2022, and was the first predominantly in-person edition since the pandemic, and saw industry delegates taking meetings and participating in pitching sessions in-person for the first time since 2019. The Festival attracted 25,424 in-person admissions and 4,899 online admissions, and welcomed 2,188 delegates from 69 countries.

The Festival opened with the UK premiere of Moonage Daydream by Brett Morgan at Sheffield's City Hall, where Ziggy Stardust performed 50 years prior. The programme included 135 films from 55 countries, 38 world premieres, 22 international premieres, 11 European premieres and 46 UK premieres. 29 projects were exhibited in the Alternate Realities programme, and 39 projects were pitched at the MeetMarket. The Festival saw the World Premiere of Werner Herzog's The Fire Within: A Requiem for Katie and Maurice Krafft; Yorkshire title A Bunch of Amateurs by Kim Hopkins won the Audience Award, Sansón and Me by Rodrigo Reyes took the top prize in International Competition, and Rosa Ruth Boesten's Master of Light which had previously pitched at the MeetMarket in 2019, won the First Feature Competition award.

Award-winning filmmaker Asif Kapadia was welcomed as Guest Curator for 2022, and curated a selection of films for the programme which had had significant impact on his journey as a filmmaker. Kapadia also spearheaded a talent initiative which challenged six filmmakers to make a short documentary in and around Sheffield, during the festival. The initiative was supported by Amazon Studios, Canon and The Kurious.

As part of its Special Programmes section, the 2022 Festival celebrated the work of Ukrainian documentary makers and kicked off the British Council and Ukrainian Institute's UK/Ukraine Season of Culture. The programme Ukraine focus: 'Password: Palianytsia' included a selection of films by Ukrainian filmmakers that were due to screen at Docudays UA festival, which was postponed due to the Russian invasion on Ukraine, a Docudays UA curated screening and talk, a delegation of 24 visiting Ukrainian-filmmakers supported by British Council, amongst film events.

Notable guests featured in the Talks & Sessions programme included: Pratibha Parmar, Asif Kapadia and editor Chris King, Nainta Desai, Charlie Craggs, Ellie Simmonds, Will Young and Clive Myrie.

The Community Programme made links across the Film, Alternate Realities, and Industry programmes, and collaborated with local audiences to broaden engagement across the Festival. Amongst its events, the programme included a group walk and discussion on the right to roam and the UK's history of trespass, an art therapy workshop, and also saw the Festival support 12 first-time, local filmmakers with free passes to attend the Festival.

=== 2021 ===
The 28th Sheffield DocFest took place between 4–13 June 2021, in a hybrid format online, physically in Sheffield, and in 16 partner cinemas across the UK. In-person film screenings in Sheffield took place in Showroom Cinema and in the historic 1920s cinema Abbeydale Picture House. Exhibitions took place across S1 Artspace, Site Gallery and the Sheffield Hallam University Performance Lab.

The Festival opened with the European premiere of Summer of Soul by Questlove, and closed with the World Premiere of The Story of Looking by Mark Cousins which had previously pitched at the MeetMarket. The programme, led by Gil, included: 191 films from 2431 submissions, 49 world premieres, 20 international premieres, 10 European premieres, and 45 UK premieres across 64 countries with 47 languages represented.

The film programme included a guest curated retrospective on Black British Cinema which saw curatorial contributions from Mark Sealy, We Are Parable, Campbell X (dir. Stud Life), Judah Attille, Karen Alexander and George Amponsah. The film programme also welcomed a new Northern Focus strand for 2021, curated by the Festival's then Industry Programme Producer Manon Euler, Film Programme Coordinator Owen Jones and Film Programme Producer Mita Suri. The strand spotlighted films and filmmakers from the northern counties of England and included amongst its selection Kim Flitcroft's Tales from a Hard City, a documentary set in Sheffield which first premiered at the Festival in 1995.

Speakers in the Festival's Talks & Sessions programme included David Olusoga, Lydia Lunch, Mark Cousins, Betsy West and Julie Cohen amongst others.

The DocFest Exchange programme, supported by the Wellcome Trust, explored the world through a non-human centred lens. The programme was curated by Jamie Allan and drew influences from the evolutionary theory that life evolved through symbiosis, organisms coming together to form other organisms. The programme included talks and workshops, as well as film screenings including titles from the Karrabing Film Collective an indigenous filmmaking group from the Northern Territory, GUNDA by Viktor Kossakovsky, as well as a one-off 35mm screening of Claude Nuridsany and Marie Pérennou's 1996 documentary Microcosmos.

The Festival also developed its Community Programme in partnership with people, artists and organisations based-in or from Sheffield. The programme featured 9 dedicated community screenings, 3 live performances, 6 online workshops and 1 in-person workshop. The Festival partnered with Sheffield-based Migration Matters Festival, the UK's largest festival about Sanctuary and refugees, to bring free mobile broadband and online festival passes to refugees and those seeking asylum in Sheffield. The Community Programme offered free or discounted tickets to those who needed support to attend and from low-income background, in an effort to tackle social isolation.

=== 2020 ===
The 27th Sheffield DocFest was due to take place between 4–9 June 2020. However, due to the COVID-19 pandemic, it was cancelled in its original form and some of the planned films and activities moved to an online format.

The programme included 115 films, from 50 countries, representing 49 spoken languages; 31 world premieres, 15 international premieres, 5 European premieres and 40 UK premieres; 20% of the programme featured first-time filmmakers. Films were available to watch online on the Festival's video-on-demand platform Doc/Player for industry delegates, and a selection of titles were made available to UK audiences via the Sheffield Doc/Fest Selects streaming platform.

The Festival's Q&As, panels and industry sessions all moved to a virtual format, and an Artist Spotlights series launched online to highlight makers and projects selected in the Alternate Realities programme. The Festival's pitching forums, the MeetMarket and Alternate Realities Talent Market, also took place online.

During the Autumn of 2020, when cinemas temporarily reopened following lockdown, the Festival hosted a number of weekend screenings and Q&As to bring films from the official selection to audiences in Sheffield.

=== 2019 ===
The 26th Sheffield DocFest was held between 6–11 June 2019, and attracted 28,098 admissions, up 9% from the previous year, with 3,489 industry delegates visiting from 59 countries.

The festival opened at Sheffield City Hall with the UK premiere of Diego Maradona by Asif Kapadia. The programme featured more than 200 documentaries with 36 world premieres, 19 international, 12 European and 91 UK premieres. The films were chosen from a submission pool of 2548 from 52 countries around the world. Programme included "The Rest by Ai Weiwei, Nomad: In the Footsteps of Bruce Chatwin by Werner Herzog, Midnight Family by Luke Lorentzen, Earth by Nikolaus Geyrhalter, One Child Nation by Nanfu Wang, About Love by Archana Atul Phadke, and For Sama by Waad Al-Kateab and Edward Watts.

Alternate Realities programme featured 28 projects and included Subconscious Sensibilities – an exhibition of virtual and augmented reality, games, interactive documentaries and large-scale digital installations at Site Gallery. "Converging Sensibilities" at the Hallam Performance Lab was a collection of 360° documentaries presented as a VR Cinema. VR experiences at the festival included: "Echo" by Georgie Pinn, "Le Lac" by Nyasha Kadandara, "Algorithmic Perfumery" by Frederik Duerinck, and "Spectre" by Bill Posters and dr. Daniel Howe – a Sheffield DocFest commission, in partnership with Site Gallery, British Council and MUTEK, with support from Arts Council England.

More than 200 speakers shared their own experiences at the 26th Sheffield DocFest. The Talks & Sessions programme included: Werner Herzog, Paul Greengrass, Jenn Nkiru, Asif Kapadia, Chidera Eggerue, Stacey Dooley, Rodney P, Michael Dapaah, Jeremy Deller and Paddy Wivell. Industry sessions programme included "My Big Break" featuring Roxy Rezvany, Ellie Flynn and Eliza Capai discussing their career highs and lows; and "Breaking the Class Ceiling" with Danny Leigh, Fiona Campbell, Kieran Yates, Billy Porter, Mia Bays and Paul Sng exploring barriers for entry to the industry.

More than 300 Decision Makers from more than 30 countries attended the 2019 Festival, including executives from Netflix, Arte, BBC, Channel 4, Cinereach, Doc Society, Dogwoof, Altitude, Submarine Entertainment, ESPN, National Geographic, POV, RYOT, Artangel, Passion Pictures and Pulse Films. Over two days, 87 teams took approximately 1,650 match-made meetings with the Decision Makers in the MeetMarket and Alternate Realities Talent Market.

=== 2018 ===
The 25th edition of Sheffield DocFest was held between 7–12 June 2018.

=== 2017 ===
The 2017 event took place from 9–14 June. A record total of 72,146 audiences attended, including 3,397 industry delegates who travelled from 54 countries, 36,008 public audiences, and virtual audiences experiencing the Festival through livestream.

The film programme hosted a record 182 films with 35 world premieres, 21 international, 24 European and 73 UK premieres. The film programme boasted premieres including: Daisy Asquith's Queerama, the Opening Night Film, scored by John Grant; Laura Poitras' new Julian Assange documentary Risk; Whitney 'Can I Be Me' from Nick Broomfield; and Winnie from Pascale Lamche, which originated in DocFest's MeetMarket.

The Alternate Realities programme featured 26 projects, 12 of which had world premieres, 1 international, 5 European and 8 UK. VR experiences at the festival included: Chasing Coral: The VR Experience, presented in a 360 dome, which accompanied the feature documentary in the film programme; Unrest VR, which accompanied the feature film Unrest; and Future Aleppo by Alex Pearson and Marshmallow Laser Feast, a commission by DocFest, in partnership with FACT, and with support from Arts Council England.

The Talks & Sessions programme included big-name speakers Lenny Henry, Peter Greenaway, Ian Hislop, Stacey Dooley, Nick Broomfield and Louis Theroux. Industry sessions included: a panel about making your film Oscar-ready, featuring Tom Oyer from the Academy of Motion Picture Arts and Sciences; a sessions with God's Own Country director Francis Lee for the Northern Talent Talk; a free public interview with YouTube sensation Elijah Quashie aka The Chicken Connoisseur; and two sessions with editor Walter Murch.

In 2017, the reinvention of all film strands to concisely represent the creative vision of the Festival was seen. The new strands featured in 2017 were: Doc/Vision, Doc/Adventure, Doc/Expose, Doc/Love, Doc/Think, Doc/Rhythm, Focus/Industry, featuring work-in-progress pieces, and Focus/India, featuring a collection of documentaries from that year's focus country of choice, to mark 70 years after Partition.

Also in 2017 was the use of new venue, The Light Cinema on the Moor, offering 3 luxury cinema screens.

Following the 2017 Festival, nine virtual reality works from the Alternate Realities exhibition were chosen to tour Latin America as part of DocFest's Realidades Alternativas tour with support from British Council. The tour visited festivals DocMontevideo in Uruguay, DocSP in Brazil, and Noviembre Electrónico in Argentina.

Notable screenings and events included:

- The world premiere Opening Night Film Queerama from director Daisy Asquith and with a soundtrack from John Grant, Alison Goldfrapp, and Hercules & Love Affair, chronicling 50 years after the decriminalization of homosexuality in the UK through the BFI archive. The Opening Night event included a Q&A with Asquith and Grant, hosted by Campbell X, and a performance from Grant
- Closing Night honoured MP Jo Cox with Closing Night Film Jo Cox: Death of an MP by director Toby Paxton, a discussion about her legacy, and a Great Get Together held on Tudor Square to encourage Festival-goers and the public to unite and remember
- A livestream of the UK Premiere of Nick Broomfield's Whitney 'Can I Be Me', featuring a Q&A with Broomfield and radio presenter Sarah-Jane Crawford, and a live tribute performance by Michele John, all broadcast live to 130 cinemas across the UK
- The return of Desert Island Docs, featuring Northern film star Maxine Peake as she discussed her favourite documentaries and the influence they hold on her life and work
- Joe Cocker: Mad Dog with Soul saw a sold-out screening in the iconic Leadmill, where Joe Cocker frequently performed
- The introduction of Docs 'til Dawn, showcasing rare cult documentaries after midnight. 2017's Docs 'til Dawn programme included Adam Curtis' HyperNormalisation, with an introduction from Curtis himself
- A retrospective looking back 50 years at 1967: The Summer of Love and Discontent, featuring films such as Allan King's Warrendale, Far from Vietnam produced by Chris Marker and directed by French New Wave filmmakers Jean-Luc Godard, Alain Resnais, Agnès Varda, Joris Ivens, William Klein and Claude Lelouch, and a rare screening of Edouard 'Yves' de Laurot's Silent Revolution/Black Liberation
- Immersive live cinema for the European premiere of Florian Habicht's Spookers, shown in the 1920s Abbeydale Picture House and featuring a fright-night cast of performers staged in the building
- The world premiere of Jamaican Dancehall competition film Bruk Out! from director Cori Wapnowski, including a follow-up dancehall dance class held by the film's protagonist Ale Camara at the DocFest Exchange on Tudor Square and the Channel 4 Party at Code featuring a performance from dancers featured in the film
- A work-in-progress special preview of 8 Minutes from the Alexander Whitley Dance Company, combining contemporary dance with NASA visuals from BAFTA-winning artist Tal Rosner, ahead of the Sadler Wells premiere in July
- The Alternate Realities Summit returned with a full day of panel sessions and keynote speakers, featuring Google's Jessica Brillhart, The Guardian's VR Deputy Editor Nicole Jackson, Amnesty International UK's Che Ramsden, and Robin McNicholas from Marshmallow Laser Feast on using the latest technology to create projects like Future Aleppo and including a surprise Skype from Future Aleppo's 13-year-old inspiration Syrian refugee Mohammed Kteish
- The European premiere of VR installation Munduruku: The Fight to Defend the Heart of the Amazon by Grace Boyle (The Feelies), James Manisty (Alchemy VR) and Pete Speller (Greenpeace), which went on to win the Alternate Realities Audience Award at DocFest 2017, and then further tour Latin America with DocFest's international VR tour 'Realidades Alternativas' with support from British Council
- Live VR experience DOOM ROOM hosted in Theatre Delicatessen mixed performance art with virtual reality in a UK premiere from Danish artist Mads Damsbo (source)
- The return of DocFest Exchange developed with Wellcome, offering elements of the film, Alternate Realities, and talks programmes for free to the public
- Years and Years frontman Olly Alexander on his new documentary Growing Up Gay and his personal struggle with mental health in the LGBTQ+ community
- Nick Broomfield in conversation with Louis Theroux for The BBC Interview, held at the sold-out Crucible Theatre
- The introduction of the Craft Summit presented by Documentary Campus, featuring industry heavyweights that dissect the art of documentary filmmaking. Speakers included editor Walter Murch, Field of Vision's Charlotte Cook and Ben Steele on serialised documentaries, Balz Bachmann and Nainita Desai on composing, and directors from the 2017 film programme Julia Dahr (Thank You for the Rain), Shaul Schwarz (Trophy) and Egil Håskjold Larsen (69 Minutes of 86 Days) on directing and cinematography

=== 2016 ===
The 2016 event took place from 10–15 June. A total of 32,769 audiences attended, including 3,534 industry delegates who travelled from 60 countries, and 29,235 public audiences, both figures a record increase on 2015.

The film programme hosted a record 160 films with 27 world premieres, 15 international, 19 European and a whopping 52 UK premieres from 49 different countries. Audiences were attracted to big filmmaking names from the documentary world including US director Michael Moore – whose film Where to Invade Next opened the Festival – Louis Theroux, Palme d'Or winning director Ken Loach, and legendary filmmakers D. A. Pennebaker and Chris Hegedus.

Women and LGBT+ subjects feature prominently throughout the Festival's selection, making up two of the festival's strands, plus a retrospective honouring Chantal Akerman. The speakers represented in the Talks & Sessions programme were 45% female.

The newly renamed Alternate Realities programme featured 14 immersive media experiences in Millennium Gallery, and 12 virtual reality documentaries in Site Gallery, The Space and Union Street. The Alternate Realities Summit was a day-long event with a focus on virtual reality, artificial intelligence, and mixed reality. The morning session saw a keynote from Ramona Pringle and Bina48, an artificially intelligent robot, while the afternoon session saw a keynote from Google's Jessica Brillhart. Also, 2016 saw the inaugural Alternate Realities Commission, supported by site Gallery and Arts Council England. Darren Emerson's Indefinite (previously Invisible) won the £5,000 prize and had its World Premiere at the Festival. Indefinite, about the detention of immigrants in Britain, was later featured by The New York Times.

In 2016, came the introduction of the DocFest Exchange on Tudor Square developed with Wellcome, which hosted a series of public talks, including an interview with This is England director Shane Meadows.

Notable screening and events included:

- The UK premiere of Michael Moore's Where to Invade Next opened the Festival at Sheffield City Hall, attended by Moore for a post-screening Q&A which was live streamed to more than 120 cinemas nationwide.
- The UK premiere of The Seasons in Quincy: Four Portraits of John Berger closed the Festival with a sell-out screening at Showroom Cinema, attended by directors Tilda Swinton and Bartek Dziadosz
- Live performances accompanied film screenings including: a performance by protagonist and famous street dancer Storyboard P following the world premiere of Storyboard P, a stranger in Sweden; a solo set by Princess Shaw following the UK premiere of Presenting Princess Shaw; and Where You're Meant to Be was screened in Abbeydale Picture House, followed by a set from Arab Strap's Aidan Moffat and the Bothy Ballad singers.
- Following the UK premieres of Strike a Pose and Kiki, the Vogue, Strike a Pose Party invited Madonna backup dancer Kevin Stea, New York ballroom leader Twiggy Pucci Garcon, and a house of voguers to O2 Academy
- USC Shoah Foundations' New Dimensions in Testimony had its World pwemiere as part of the Alternate Realities Exhibition, showcasing groundbreaking technology in natural language processing software through a hologram of Holocaust Survivor Pinchas Gutter. The project was awarded both the Alternate Realities Interactive Award and Audience Award for Interactive Project. It was also featured in the Alternate Realities Summit, with creator Dr Stephen Smith presenting a keynote, joined by Gutter himself on stage
- Sir David Attenborough came to the Festival for the first time, seeing a sold-out talk at the Crucible Theatre, which was live broadcast to the Outdoor Screen on Tudor Square
- Ken Loach held a packed Q&A following Versus: The Life and Films of Ken Loach
- D. A. Pennebaker was honoured with a retrospective, and also attended the UK premiere of his film Unlocking the Cage. The legendary documentary maker was also featured in conversation with collaborator Chris Hegedus at the Crucible Theatre
- Joanna Lumley delivered a packed talk at Crucible Theatre
- Snooker legend Ronnie O'Sullivan returned to the Crucible Theatre, where he has won five World Championship titles, to discuss his favourite documentaries

=== 2015 ===
The 22nd Festival ran for six days, 5–10 June. More than 20 venues were used to host films, sessions, interactive exhibitions and networking events, with the full programme announced on the morning of the general election on 7 May. A record number of audiences attended the festival, with 3,422 festival delegates and 27,917 members of the public.

A total of 148 films was shown, of which a record breaking 31 were world premieres, including Sean McAllister's hotly anticipated A Syrian Love Story, Brian Hill's The Confessions of Thomas Quick, and Jake Witzenfeld's Oriented, 41 UK premieres, 13 international premieres, and 19 European premieres. Nearly 50% of the film programming was headed up by female filmmakers, with 73 of the films either produced or directed by women filmmakers.

Notable screenings and events included:

- The UK premiere of Joshua Oppenheimer's The Look of Silence at Showroom Cinema opened the Festival with sell out screenings in both Screens 3 and 4.
- Opening Night continued at Sheffield City Hall with the world premiere of archive film The Show of Shows: 100 Years of Vaudeville, Circuses and Carnivals directed by Benedikt Erlingsson and scored by Georg Hólm and Orri Páll Dýrason of Sigur Rós and the Head of the Pagan Church in Iceland and godfather of Icelandic music, Hilmar Örn Hilmarsson. The film features never before seen footage from fairgrounds, circuses, variety performances, vaudeville and more, from the very birth of film to the present day, including footage from The University of Sheffield's National Fairground Archive.
- A special screening of Jessica Edward's bio-doc Mavis! documenting the life of Mavis Staples was held in the classic Victorian Sheffield Botanical Gardens.
- Sheffield Repertory Orchestra performing Gustav Holst's The Planets live to a screening of interplanetary odysseys and commissioned visuals by Sheffield creative design agency Human and commentary from astronomer Paul Crowther.
- A 'Women in Docs' strand celebrating films with women on screen and behind the lens.
- War Work: 8 Songs with Film, a master work of poetic and musical archive composed and directed by Michael Nyman, and performed by Michael Nyman Band and Hilary Summers to commemorate the First World War.
- A retrospective of British activist filmmaker John Akomfrah.
- A closing night event including screening of Monty Python – The Meaning of Live by Roger Graef and James Rogan, with Michael Palin in attendance for a post-screening Q&A and book signing.
- The Ideas & Science strand, supported by the Wellcome Trust, focusing on creativity and innovation at the heart of documentary, digital and interactive.
- An "Interactive at Sheffield" exhibition presented by Crossover Labs, featuring 16 interactive documentaries held at Millennium Gallery.
- A dedicated virtual reality arcade at Site Gallery featuring 9 projects on a collection of Oculus Rift, Samsung Gear VR and Google Cardboard.
- FINAL DAYS by British artist Heather Phillipson, a specially commissioned installation at Castle House, a defunct department store in the heard of Sheffield. Supported by Arts Council England, presented in partnership with University of Sheffield and Serpentine Galleries.

There were 83 sessions, talks and masterclasses, with speakers including Davina McCall, Nicky Campbell, Jon Snow, Lucy Worsley, Philippa Perry, Ian Katz, Charlotte Moore, and Robin Ince.

=== 2014 ===
The Festival expanded from five days to six and for the first time began on a Saturday. Screenings took place across a wider range of more unusual venues in Sheffield and the Peak District. There were 130 films shown, of which 21 were world premieres, 24 UK premieres, and 12 European premieres.

World premieres included Martin Scorsese's documentary about The New York Review of Books, The 50 Year Argument; Alex Holmes' Stop At Nothing: The Lance Armstrong Story; The Last Man On The Moon, about former astronaut Eugene Cernan who also attended the Festival; One Rogue Reporter, written and directed by former 'Daily Star' reporter Rich Peppiatt; and Brilliant Creatures: Rebels of Oz.

Notable screenings and events included:

- The European premiere of Pulp: A Film About Life, Death and Supermarkets directed by Florian Habicht, telling the story of Pulp's final concert in Sheffield in 2012 and including a simulcast and live satellite Q&A with the band, broadcast to 120 cinemas across the UK and Ireland.
- The premiere of Kim Longinotto's Love Is All at Chatsworth House with a soundtrack by Richard Hawley, combining film material from the BFI National Archive with original music in a similar vein to previous DocFest projects From the Sea to the Land Beyond and The Big Melt.
- Saint Etienne performing a live score to How We Used To Live, Paul Kelly's documentary about vanishing London.
- Summer Camp performing a live soundtrack to Guardian writer Charlie Lyne's film essay Beyond Clueless, about 90s teen movies.
- A 'Hell on Wheels' strand of cycling films to celebrate the Tour de France visiting Yorkshire.
- Nightly screenings in the Peak Cavern including Thomas Balmes' Happiness.
- A spotlight on South Africa including Miners Shot Down about the Marikana miners' strike.
- A retrospective of experimental Greek-French director Agnès Varda.
- An 'Interactive at Sheffield' exhibition presented by Crossover Labs, featuring 15 interactive documentaries delivered through devices including the Oculus Rift Virtual Reality headset. This included the first documentary videogames to be shown at the Festival, RIOT: Civil Unrest and Papers, Please.
- Immersive documentary Door into the Dark.

Speakers included Peter Bazalgette, Jeremy Deller, Brian Eno, Sue Perkins, Grayson Perry, John Pilger, Jon Snow, and Ondi Timoner.

There were 82 conference sessions and masterclasses, and a record number of pitch opportunities for filmmakers worth £200,000.

=== 2013 ===
In 2013, there was a record number of films and delegates. Delegate numbers rose by 18% to 3,129. There were a record 18 international delegations including representatives from Armenia, Canada, Jordan, Morocco, the Netherlands, the State of Palestine, Russia, South Africa, and South Sudan, attending the Festival with a special focus on factual filmmaking in their regions.

Over 20 countries were presented by 250 buyers and decision makers.

Film submissions topped 2,000 for the first time. Films shown numbered at least 200, of which there were 77 feature length documentaries, 33 shorts, 10 interactive projects and one art installation. There were 18 world premieres, 12 UK premieres, and 5 European premieres. A record 14 film screening at DocFest were developed and funded through MeetMarket, including Joshua Oppenheimer's The Act of Killing which went on to win the Audience Award.

World premieres included Basically, Johnny Moped, Emptying The Skies, Everybody's Child, A Fragile Trust: Plagiarism, Power & Jayson Blair at the New York Times, Here Was Cuba, Mirage Men, Notes from the Inside with James Rhodes, Particle fever, Plot for Peace, Project Wild Thing, Richard Pryor: Omit the Logic, The Big Melt, Which Way is the Front Line from Here? The Life and Time of Tim Hetherington, The Man Whose Mind Exploded, The Road to Fame, The Secret Life of Uri Geller – Psychic Spy?, Thin Ice, and To Let The World In.

European premieres included After Tiller, Dirty Wars, and Pandora's Promise.

UK premieres included The Act of Killing and The Crash Reel. The Act of Killing went on to win a Bafta and was named best film of 2013 by The Guardian.

Film strands included Behind the Beats, Best of British, Cross-Platform, Euro/Doc, First Cut, Global Encounters, New York Times Op-Docs, Queer Screen, Resistance, Shorts, The Habit of Art, and This Sporting Life.

A new strand, Films on Film, screened a notable film with a documentary about it, for example The Exorcist (Director's Cut) with The Fear of God: 25 Years of The Exorcist, and John Waters' Female Trouble with I Am Divine. This strand aimed to attract a wider mix of people, and was supported by Lottery funding through the BFI's Film Festival Fund which provides extra resources to help grow film festival audiences.

The DocFest Retrospective strand celebrated the work of Japanese filmmaker Shōhei Imamura.

More than 75 directors were present and took part in Q&A sessions.

Notable screenings and events included:

- Three opening night films:
  - The Big Melt, a documentary film about Sheffield's steel industry by Martin Wallace with a live soundtrack from Jarvis Cocker and more than 50 musicians.
  - An in-cave screening of The Summit, a climbing documentary by Nick Ryan about the quest to reach the peak of K2. This was screened at Peak Cavern, a cave known as the 'Devil's Arse', in the Peak District.
  - The European premiere of Pussy Riot: A Punk Prayer followed by a Skype interview with Katya Samutsevich, one of the members of Pussy Riot.
- A live soundtrack performance of Songs from the Shipyards by Mercury Prize-nominees The Unthanks.
- A look behind-the-scenes of the BBC's Who Do You Think You Are? series.
- A day of events centred on the Ken Loach documentary The Spirit of '45.
- TEDxSheffield, a fringe event which took place the day before the Festival.
- The Howard Street outdoor screen which showed films for free for 12 hours each day during the Festival.
- Blast Theory's interactive online game I'd Hide You.
- Doc/Feast, a street food market made up of local foodie businesses, plus a special DocFest ale.

There were 80 conference sessions and masterclasses, and 300 speakers. Notable speakers included Adam Buxton, Melvyn Bragg, Jonathan Franzen, Uri Geller, Ira Glass, Alex Graham, Janice Hadlow, Jay Hunt, Ross Kemp, Mark Kermode, Sir Trevor McDonald, Hardeep Singh Kohli, Walter Murch, Miranda Sawyer interviewing Michael Palin, Sue Perkins, Captain Sensible, and Alan Yentob.

=== 2012 ===
A total of 2,657 delegates from 67 countries attended the Festival, and general admissions were 20,079.

Notable screenings and events included:

- The debut of From The Sea To The Land Beyond, a documentary by Penny Woolcock with a live soundtrack performance by British Sea Power.
- A surprise performance by Sixto Rodriguez, the star of opening night film Searching for Sugar Man, which went on to win an Oscar for Best Documentary.

Speakers included Gareth Malone and Tim Pool.

=== 2011 ===
In 2011, the Festival moved from November to June, right off the back of the November 2010 Festival. The Festival opened with Morgan Spurlocks' POM Wonderful Presents: The Greatest Movie Ever Sold and featured box-office hit Senna, Alma Har'el's debut Bombay Beach, an Albert Maysels retrospective, and Oscar-winning director Barbara Kopple's Gun Fight.

== Awards ==
The Sheffield DocFest Awards honour the best documentaries from the DocFest programme, and are judged by industry professionals.

=== Current categories ===
- Sheffield DocFest Audience Award voted for by audiences, the award is given to feature films in the programme.
- Grand Jury Award for the International Competition honours films that best display strong artistic vision and courageous storytelling. This award is Academy Award® accredited.
- Grand Jury Award for the International Short Film Competition honours the best creative approach to documentary under 40 minutes. This award is Academy Award®, BAFTA and BIFA-accredited.
- Grand Jury Award for the International First Feature Competition honours the future of non-fiction film and celebrates promising talent.
- Grand Jury Award for the International Alternate Realities Competition honours the best innovative non-fiction work.
- Tim Hetherington Award presented in association with Dogwoof, this award was introduced in 2013 to honour photojournalist and filmmaker Tim Hetherington. The award recognises a film and filmmaker that best reflects the legacy of Tim Hetherington, who was committed to humanitarian and social concerns throughout the world. It includes a cash prize and is decided by a jury including Tim's mother, Judith Hetherington.
- Youth Jury Award is selected by some of the UK's most passionate young documentary lovers. The jury is made up of five young people aged 18–23, who take part in a series of workshops with industry professionals ahead of the festival.

=== Previous categories ===
- Inspiration Award, introduced in 2009, which celebrates a figure in the industry who has championed documentary and helped get great work into the public eye.
- In The Dark Audio Award, introduced in 2014 to highlight global creativity and innovation in audio storytelling.
- Illuminate Award supported by Wellcome, exploring the screen chemistry between human storytelling and scientific understanding.
- Environmental Award given to the documentary that best addresses or raises awareness of the environmental challenges faces by the world.
- Art Doc Award, championing bold, new creative forms of non-fiction cinema and artists' films.
- New Talent Award, discovers and honours the future of documentary film, celebrating new talent and fresh perspectives.
- Student Doc Award, for films made as part of tertiary course work at UK and international universities, judged by a panel of industry experts.
- Alternate Realities Interactive Award, awarded to projects that exhibit originality in their approach to form, storytelling and delivery.
- Alternate Realities Virtual Reality Award, celebrating virtual reality documentary as a flourishing creative genre awarding the project that displays excellence in factual storytelling as well as technical ingenuity.
- Innovation Award

=== Other awards presented at the festival ===
- The Whickers' Film & TV Funding Award, presented annually at Sheffield DocFest by The Whickers since 2016, this prize is awarded to an emerging filmmaker from anywhere in the world with the most promising pitch for a director-led documentary.
- EDA Award for Best Female-Directed Film, presented at Sheffield DocFest in 2012 and 2013 by the Alliance of Women Film Journalists. All female-directed films in the festival programme were eligible for the award.
- The first ever Peter Wintonick Award, which celebrates activist filmmaking, in honour of the late Canadian documentary filmmaker and friend of the festival Peter Wintonick was awarded in 2014.
- Creative Leadership Award, launched in 2016 to highlight an influential individual's contribution to the international documentary industry.
- Award for Unsung Hero in Factual TV, launched in 2016, honouring a vital, under-the-radar contribution to British factual television.
- Jerwood First Cuts Award

== Winners ==
=== 2026 ===
33nd edition's winners are as follows:

Award	Winner
International Competition
Grand Jury Award	"Filthy" (Sucia – Per què no vas fer res?) by Bàrbara Mestanza and Marc Pujolar
Special Mention	"Time Machine Maidan" (Машина Часу Майдан) by Roman Liubyi, and Volodymyr Tykhyy
International First Feature Competition
Grand Jury Award	"Magma" by Mia Bendrimia
Special Mention	"A City in the Forest" by Lev Omelchenko and Nolan Huber

=== 2025 ===
32nd edition's winners are as follows:

Award	Winner
International Competition
Grand Jury Award	Welded Together by Anastasiya Miroshnichenko
Special Mention	The Gas Station Attendant by Karla Murthy
International First Feature Competition
Grand Jury Award	Comparsa by Vickie Curtis, Doug Anderson (Guatemala
Special Mention	Carmela and the Walkers by Luis Herrera, Esteban Coloma

=== 2023 ===
Award	Winner
International Competition (Grand Jury Award)	In the Rearview by Maciek Hamela (Special Mention: Stone Town by Jing Guo and Dingding KE)
International First Feature Competition (Grand Jury Award)	Q by Jude Chehab
International Short Film Competition (Grand Jury Award)	The Takeover by Anders Hammer (Special Mention: A Maiden Sings by Max Torrés Altés)
Tim Hetherington Award	20 Days in Mariupol by Mstyslav Chernov (Special Mention: Total Trust by Jialing Zhang)
International Alternate Realities Competition (Grand Jury Award)	The Man Who Couldn't Leave by Singing Chen (Special Mentions: Surfacing by Rosa Rossella Schillaci and Within Touching Distance by ZU-UK)
Youth Jury Award	Anhell69 by Theo Montoya (Special Mention: 1001 Days by Kethiwe Ngcobo & Chloe White)
Audience Award	Your Fat Friend by Jeanie Finlay
The Whickers Film & TV Funding Award	Women of My Life by Zahraa Ghandour
The Channel 4 First Cut Pitch	Catherine Harte
BBC Storyville Development Pitch	With Woman by Mia Harvey and Ayo Akinwolere Kashpirovsky by Lukasz Konopa
The Podcast Pitch supported by The Whickers	First Prize: Time, Paper, Bone by Catherine Boulle and Bongani Kona Second Prize: Breathing Lyrically by Taqwa Sadiq

=== 2022 ===
Award	Winner
International Competition	Sansón and Me by Rodrigo Reyes (Special Mentions: One Day in Ukraine by Volodymyr Tykhyy and After the End of the World by Nadim Mishlawi)
International First Feature Competition	Master of Light by Rosa Ruth Boesten (Special Mention: Julie on Line by Mia Ma)
International Short Film Competition	Fawley by Chu-Li Shewring and Adam Gutch (Special Mention: Calling Cabral by Welket Bungué)
Tim Hetherington Award	Lyra by Alison Millar (Special Mention: The Territory by Alex Pritz)
Alternate Realities Award	The Sound Voice Project by Hannah Conway (Special Mention: The Acquisitions Panel by Rachel Briscoe)
Youth Jury Award	Alis by Nicolas van Hemelryck and Clare Weiskopf (Special Mention: Four Journeys by Louis Hothothot)
Audience Award (Film)	A Bunch of Amateurs by Kim Hopkins
Audience Award (Alternate Realities)	Santa Barbara by Diana Markosian
The Whickers Film & TV Funding Award	Our Hoolocks by Chinmoy Sonowal & Ragini Nath
The Channel 4 First Cut Pitch	Ben Cheetham

=== 2021 ===
Award	Winner
International Competition	Nũhũ Yãg Mũ Yõg Hãm: This Land Is Our Land! by Isael Maxakali, Sueli Maxakali, Carolina Canguçu and Roberto Romero (Special Mentions: Summer by Vadim Kostrov and Double Layered Town by Komori Haruka & Seo Natsumi)
International Competition Special Jury Award	Equatorial Constellations by Silas Tiny
UK Competition	Ali and His Miracle Sheep by Maythem Ridha (Special Mention: The Battle of Denham Ford by Bradley & Bradley)
UK Competition Special Jury Award	Portrait of Kaye by Ben Reed
First Feature Award	Fixed barricade at Hamdalaye crossing by Thomas Bauer (Special Mention: Charm Circle by Nira Burstein)
Short Film Award	Barataria by Julie Nguyen Van Qui (Special Mention: Homage to the Work of Philip Henry Gosse by Pablo Martin Weber)
Tim Hetherington Award	The silence of the Mole by Anais Taracena (Special Mentions: Nũhũ Yãg Mũ Yõg Hãm: This Land Is Our Land! by Isael Maxakali, Sueli Maxakali, Carolina Canguçu and Roberto Romero)
Youth Jury Award	If god were a woman / Si dios fuera mujer by Angélica Cervera
Audience Award	Charm Circle by Nira Burstein
The Whickers Film & TV Funding Award	Kamay by Ilyas Yourish and Shahrokh Bikaran

=== 2020 ===
In 2020, the Festival was cancelled due to the COVID-19 pandemic, and screenings moved online. No awards were placed during this year.

=== 2019 ===
Award	Winner
Grand Jury award	Midnight Family by Luke Lorentzen (Special Mention: For Sama, Midnight Traveller)
International award	Earth by Nikolaus Geyrhalter
Art award	No Data Plan by Miko Revereza
Tim Hetherington award	One Child Nation by Nanfu Wang And Jialing Zhang
New Talent award	About Love by Archana Atul Phadke
Youth award	Baracoa Directed by Pablo Briones And The Moving Picture Boys (Special Mention: Jawline)
Short award	America by Garrett Bradley
Best Digital Experience award	Echo by Georgie Pinn, Kendyl Rossi
Best Digital Narrative award	Le Lac created by Nyasha Kadandara
Doc Audience award	For Sama by Waad Al-Kateab, Edward Watts
Alternate Realities Audience award	Algorithmic Perfumery by Frederik Duerinck
The Whickers Film & TV Funding award	All That Remains by Amanda Mustard
The BBC Three pitch	Rebecca Southworth, Ashley Turner
The Joseph Rowntree Foundation X Guardian pitch	Edwin Mingard And Elizabeth Benjamin (Stoke Film) And Hazel Falck – United Voices Of The World
The Channel 4 First Cut pitch	Ashley Francis-Roy

==== 2018 ====
Award	Winner
Grand Jury Award	The Silence of Others (Almudena Carracedo, Robert Bahar – Spain/USA)
Environmental Award	Wild Relatives (Jumana Manna – Lebanon/Norway/Germany)
Tim Hetherington Award	Kinshasa Makambo (Dieudo Hamadi – DRC/France/Switzerland/Germany/Norway)
Illuminate Award	América (Erick Stoll, Chase Whiteside – USA)
Art Doc Award	Music When The Lights Go Out (Ismael – Caneppele Brazil)
New Tallent Award	Minding the Gap (Bing Liu – USA)
Youth jury Award	Amal (Mohamed Siam – Denmark/Egypt/France/Germany)
Short Doc Award	Black Sheep (Ed Perkins – UK)
Alternative Reality Virtual Reality Awards	Face to Face (Michelle Gabel and Michaela Holland – UK)
Alternative Realities Interactive Award	The Voice of the Unicorn (Richard Butchins – Japan/UK)
Doc Audience Award	Minding the Gap (Bing Liu – USA)
Alternative Realities Audience Award	Grenfell: our Home (Jonathan Rudd – UK)
The Whickers Film & TV Funding Award	Mirror Mirror On the Wall (Sascha Schöberl – Germany/China)
Doc/Dispatch Award	Notes from Dunblane: Lessons From A School Shooting (Kim Snyder – UK)

==== 2017 ====
Award	Winner
Grand Jury Award supported by Screen International & Broadcast	City of Ghosts Special mention: The Work and The Death and Life of Marsha P. Johnson
Environment Award supported by Discovery Communications	A River Below Special mention: The Last Animals
Tim Hetherington Award supported by Dogwoof	Strong Island
Illuminate Award developed with Wellcome	Unrest
Art Doc Award	City of the Sun Special mention: Brimstone and Glory
New Talent Award	Artemio Special mention: Übermensch
Youth Jury Award	69 Minutes of 86 Days Special mention: Rat Film
Short Doc Award supported by Virgin Money Sheffield Lounge	The Rabbit Hunt Special mention: Edith+Eddie
Doc Audience Award supported by Curzon Home Cinema	The Work
Alternate Realities Virtual Reality Award	Unrest VR
Alternate Realities Interactive Award	My Grandmother's Lingo
Alternate Realities Audience Award	Munduruku: The Fight to Defend the Heart of the Amazong
Whicker's World Foundation Awards	Funding Award Winner: Pailin Wedel for Hope Frozen Funding Award Runner Up: Duncan Cowles for Silent Men The Sage Award Winner: Steven Carne for My NHS: Voices from the Grassroots The Sage Award Runner Up: Roy Delaney for The Bard's Wife
Doc/Dispatch Prize supported by Deutsche Welle	The Fight

==== 2016 ====
Award	Winner
Grand Jury Award	Cameraperson Special mention: The Settlers
Interactive Award	New Dimensions in Testimony Special mention: Walden, a Game
Environmental Award	SEED: The Untold Story Special mention: Death By Design
Short Doc Award	I'm Not From Here
Youth Jury Award	Sonita
Student Doc Award	My Aleppo
Tim Hetherington Award	Tempestad Special mention: Hooligan Sparrow
VR Award	Notes on Blindness: Into Darkness Special mention: Home – An Immersive Spacewalk Experience
Dr Clifford Shaw Feature Doc Audience Award	Presenting Princess Shaw
Audience Award for Short Doc	Tarikat
Audience Award for Alternate Realities Interactive Project	New Dimensions in Testimony
Audience Award for Alternate Realities VR Project	Home – An Immersive Spacewalk Experience
Creative Leadership Award	Sheila Nevins
Award for Unsung Hero in Factual TV	Jan Tomalin
Storytelling and Innovation Award	Notes on Blindness
Whicker's World Funding Award	Burma's Lost Royals Runner up: Americaville
Whicker's World Vet Award	Fluechtlinge
Whicker's World Audio Award	Little Volcanoes Runner up: The Dhamazzedi Bell

==== 2015 ====
The awards were held on 10 June 2015 at the Crucible Theatre.

Award	Winner
Sheffield DocFest Audience Award	The Look of Silence (feature doc), Dear Araucaria (short doc), Disney Animated (interactive project)
Grand Jury Award	A Syrian Love Story
Interactive Award	Clouds Over Sidra Special mention: Do Not Track
Environmental Award	How to Change the World Special mention: Landfill Harmonic
Short Doc Award	Starting Point
Youth Jury Award	3 1/2 Minutes, 10 Bullets
Student Doc Award sponsored by London Film Academy	The Archipelago
Tim Hetherington Award	Cartel Land
Inspiration Award	Heather Croall
In The Dark Audio Award	The Woman on Ice

==== 2014 ====
The awards were held on 12 June 2014. For the first time, the award-winning documentary short automatically qualifies for consideration for the Academy Awards.

Award	Winner
Sheffield DocFest Audience Award	Still The Enemy Within
Special Jury Prize	Attacking The Devil: Harold Evans and the Last Nazi War Crime Special mention: Night Will Fall
Sheffield Innovation Award sponsored by BT Vision	Highrise (documentary)
Sheffield Green Award	Unearthed
Sheffield Shorts Award	Amanda F***ing Palmer on the Rocks
The Wintonick Award	Vessel
Sheffield Youth Jury Award	The Internet's Own Boy: The Story of Aaron Swartz
Student Doc Award	Our Curse
Tim Hetherington Award	Profession: Documentarist
Inspiration Award	Laura Poitras

A Lifetime Achievement Award was presented to Roger Graef.

==== 2013 ====
The awards were held on 16 June 2013, and presented by Jeremy Hardy.

Award	Winner
Sheffield DocFest Audience Award	Joint winners: The Act of Killing and Particle Fever
Special Jury Prize	The Act of Killing Special mention: Mothers
Sheffield Innovation Award sponsored by BT Vision	Alma, a Tale of Violence
Sheffield Green Award	Pandora's Promise
Sheffield Shorts Award	Slomo
Sheffield Youth Jury Award	God Loves Uganda
Student Doc Award	Boys
Tim Hetherington Award	The Square
EDA Award for Best Female-Directed Film	Rafea Solar Mama
Inspiration Award	Nick Fraser, editor of the BBC's Storyville

The Alliance of Women Film Journalists also presented a Special EDA Award to Sheffield DocFest's Festival Director, Heather Croall, naming her 2013's Ambassador of Women's Films.

==== 2012 ====
The awards were held on 17 June 2012.

Award	Winner
Sheffield DocFest Audience Award	5 Broken Cameras
Special Jury Prize	Marina Abramović: The Artist is Present
Sheffield Innovation Award sponsored by BT Vision	Bear 71
Sheffield Green Award	Law of the Jungle
Sheffield Shorts Award	The Globe Collector
Sheffield Youth Jury Award	Photographic Memory
Student Doc Award	The Betrayal – Nerakhoon
EDA Award for Best Female-Directed Film	Going Up The Stairs
Inspiration Award	Penny Woolcock

==== 2011 ====
Award	Winner
Sheffield DocFest Audience Award	Give Up Tomorrow
Special Jury Prize	The Interrupters
Sheffield Innovation Award sponsored by BT Vision	Welcome to Pine Point
Sheffield Green Award	You've Been Trumped
Sheffield Youth Jury Award	We Are Poets
Student Doc Award	Eighty Eight
Inspiration Award	Nick Broomfield

A Lifetime Achievement Award was presented to Albert Maysles.

==== 2010 ====
Award	Winner
Sheffield DocFest Audience Award	Joint winners: Father, Son and the Holy War and Scenes from a Teenage Killing
Special Jury Prize	Pink Saris Special mention: Nostalgia for the Light
Sheffield Innovation Award	The Arbor Special mention: Prison Valley
Sheffield Green Award	Rainmakers Special mention: Into Eternity
Sheffield Youth Jury Award	The Battle for Barking Special mention: Marathon Boy
Student Doc Award	No Easy Time
Inspiration Award	Kim Longinotto

==== 2009 ====
Award	Winner
Sheffield DocFest Audience Award	Junior
Special Jury Prize	Videocracy
Sheffield Innovation Award	LoopLoop Special mention: The Big Issue
Sheffield Green Award	Blood of the Rose
Sheffield Youth Jury Award	Sons of Cuba
Student Doc Award	Arsey Versey
Inspiration Award	Adam Curtis

== Films ==
Sheffield DocFest's film programme showcases international documentaries and new works of non-fiction.

The Film programme includes:

- More than 150 screenings of feature, mid-length and short documentaries and works of non-fiction each year.
- Q&As with the filmmakers and protagonists of the films.
- A strand of panels corresponding to the main programme, featuring filmmakers and protagonists of the films, including sessions, workshops, and pitching competitions.
- Free outdoor screenings of U-rated documentaries.
- A series of films In Competition for prestigious awards.

== Alternate Realities ==
Sheffield DocFest runs a number of programmes focused on new media development in interactive and immersive projects and virtual reality, titled Alternate Realities.

The Alternate Realities programme includes:

- The Alternative Realities Summit, which is a full day of sessions exploring the digital revolution in broadcasting. Delegates can network with representatives from the film and TV industry, which have included keynote speakers such as Google's Jessica Brillhart, BBC North's Richard Deverell, Frank Rose, Steven Johnson and Katerina Cizek from Highrise. The day includes breakout sessions and round table discussions.
- The Alternative Realities Market, which is a pitching event for interactive and digital projects run in a similar way to the festival's MeetMarket. It took place for the first time in 2013, when 27 project teams pitched to 85 cross-platform decision makers.
- A strand of Alternative Realities panels during the main Festival conference programme, which includes sessions, commissioning editor panels, workshops, project showcasing, and cross-platform pitching competitions.
- The Alternative Realities Exhibition, which shows and hosts interactive and VR including those commissioned especially for the Festival. This is also a space where delegates can meet and network.
- Meet the Maker sessions, which allow audiences to meet the artists behind the projects featured in the exhibition for informal Q&As.

In 2017, Alternate Realities at Sheffield DocFest was awarded Arts Council England NPO status, helping the programme to grow even further.

== Talks & Sessions ==
Sheffield DocFest's Talks & Sessions programme features high-profile speakers, industry creatives, and documentary talent in a variety of discussions, large public talks, commissioning question panels, interviews, and showcasing sessions.

Past high-profile speakers include Sir David Attenborough, Louis Theroux, Nick Broomfield, Stacey Dooley, Joanna Lumley, Reggie Yates, Walter Murch, Michael Moore, Kim Longinotto, Tilda Swinton, D. A. Pennebaker, John Akomfrah, Brett Morgan, Sue Perkins, and Joan Rivers.

== Marketplace & Talent ==
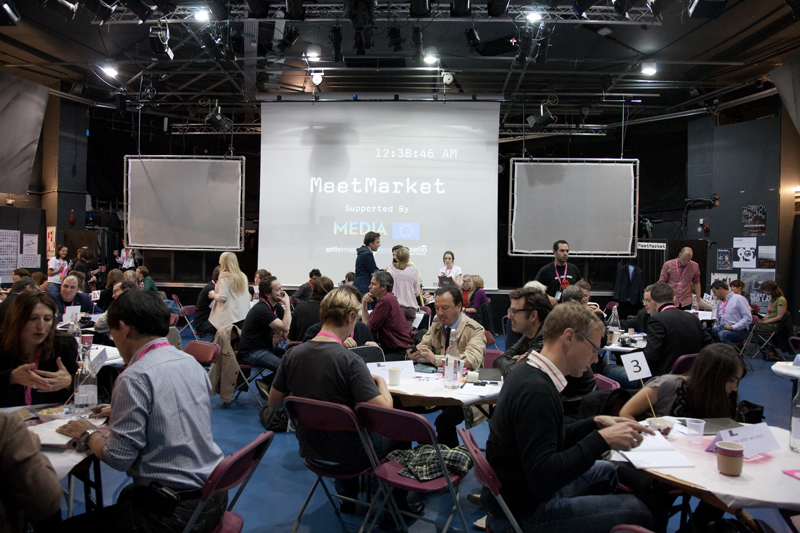
Meetmarket

=== MeetMarket & Alternate Realities Market ===
MeetMarket & Alternate Realities Market is a documentary pitching event held at Sheffield DocFest, where filmmakers pitch their project ideas one-on-one to UK and international broadcasters, funders and distributors.

Former Festival Director Heather Croall introduced MeetMarket to DocFest in 2006 and developed it as an alternative to public pitching (where filmmakers pitch to a large audience). Each meeting is match-made and scheduled with relevant Decision Makers. Each year there are approximately 65 projects, which hold many one-to-one across two days. In 2017, the event was attended by 330 Decision Makers.

Since its introduction, nearly 10,800 meetings have taken place for 609 documentary and digital projects (as of July 2017).

All meetings held at MeetMarket have been requested by both parties, meaning it's more likely for a deal to be made. While the focus is on achieving funding and distribution, participants also benefit from advice on production, distribution, exhibition, marketing and outreach. Filmmaker Guy Davidi said "Pitching in intimate round-table sessions was a big comfort. It reduces tension and competitiveness and makes the whole thing much more relaxed and fun. We have created important connections and in one case it led directly to an investment."

In 2017, 63 projects from 22 countries, including new films from Michael Moore, Mark Cousins, Kim Longinotto, Dionne Walker, Laura Poitras, and Jerry Rothwell, and 24 Alternate Realities projects were selected, including works from Charlotte Mikkelborg, Richard Nockles, and INK Stories. 330 Decision Makers took part, including representatives from Submarine, BBC Earth VR, Royal Shakespeare Company, The National Film Board of Canada, VICE, and Pulse Films.

In 2016, 64 projects from 27 countries were chosen to participate, including new films from Orlando von Einsiedel, Jennifer Brea, Mike Lerner, Stefan Kloos, Nick Fraser, Christoph Jorg, David Letterman, Al Morrow, Jeanie Finlay, Andre Singer, Amir Amiriani, and Catherine Allen. 25 Alternate Realities Market projects were chosen, including works from Katharine Round, Alex Pearson, Darren Emerson, and Jennifer Brea. 313 Decision Makers took part in the MeetMarket, Alternate Realities Market and various other Marketplace initiatives from organisations including Red Bull, Canal+, Al Jazeera, Discovery, National Geographic, Google, and Netflix.

In 2015, 64 projects from 19 countries were chosen to participate in MeetMarket from 600 submissions, including new films from John Akomfrah, Lindsey Dryden and Maheen Zia. 300 executives, distributors, commissioners, funders, advisors and buyers across documentary and digital media took part in the MeetMarket and Marketplace activity including The Guardian, BBC, Arte, Dogwoof and Channel 4.

In 2014, 64 projects were chosen to participate in MeetMarket, including new films from Franny Armstrong, William Karel, and Stanley Nelson Jr. 290 investors, commissioners and production partners took part including commissioners from Netflix, Dazed, Vice, Vimeo and Nowness and distributors Oscilloscope Laboratories, Dogwoof and PBS.

In 2013 MeetMarket attracted more than 600 applications. More than 60 projects from 18 countries were chosen to participate. Filmmakers included Franny Armstrong, Marshall Curry, Jeanie Finlay, Alex Gibney, Phil Grabsky, Brian Hill, Viktor Kossakovsky and Joshua Oppenheimer. The selection also included six cross-platform projects.

MeetMarket films and Alternate Realities Market projects are tracked for success across awards and other film festivals. Films and projects have gone on to win awards at Sundance, Tribeca, IDFA, Hot Docs and DocFest.

Notable films to achieve funding through MeetMarket include Unrest and Unrest VR, Notes on Blindness and Notes on Blindness: Into Darkness, Joshua Oppenheimer's The Act of Killing and The Look of Silence, Searching for Sugarman, Jeanie Finlay's The Great Hip Hop Hoax, Ping Pong, 5 Broken Cameras, and God Loves Uganda.

=== Pitches ===
The Marketplace plays host to further initiatives, such as pitches and prize competitions. Pitched projects are selected from an open call, cover a range of topics, and offer funding, in-kind support and Festival Pass prizes.

Previous pitches include:

- The BFI Film Fund
- The Whicker's World Foundation Film & TV Award, offering £80,000 to the winning pitch
- BBC Northern Docs Pitch
- The Guardian Pitch
- VICE Rule Britannia Pitch
- The Channel 4 First Cut Pitch
- Virgin Money Shorts Competition

=== Training Initiatives ===
The Marketplace also holds All Year training initiatives, including Future Producer School. Future Producer School, created by Sheffield DocFest and Bungalow Town Productions, has successfully run every year since its launch in 2014. Aimed at emerging producers currently working in the industry, the primary outcome of Future Producer School is to develop industry partnerships and provide industry knowledge and experience to up-and-coming producers that have the ambition to become international feature documentary producers. Notable alumni include Eloise King, Julia Nottingham, Lindsey Dryden, and Sky Neal.

On-Screen Talent Market is a Sheffield DocFest initiative to connect charismatic subject-specialists with producers, commissioners, and other Decision Makers looking for fresh faces for their programmes. The programme includes an intensive morning training programme giving insight into the industry via first-hand encounters with established professionals, and is designed for the experts to hone their skills in presenting themselves to the media. This is followed by an afternoon of match-made one-to-one meetings between the talent and television executives. The programme is designed and delivered in collaboration with the Academic Ideas Lab.

Doc/Dinner allows a group of emerging filmmakers to dine with industry executives to exchange ideas and expertise, hosted by Yates. In 2017, execs from the BBC, Channel 4, VICE, Pulse Films and The Guardian met with 20 young filmmakers.

=== Delegations ===
DocFest hosts a number of international and national delegations each year, including delegations from Norway, Scotland, Palestine, Indonesia, Jordan, Cuba and Wider Europe.

== Social events and networking ==
Each year, DocFest hosts parties, social industry and networking drinks and events during the Festival including the annual Guilty Pleasures Party held at both DocFest and in Amsterdam at IDFA.

Social events are themed around the programme; for example, in 2017 this included: the I Will Always Love Docs Party, celebrating the premiere of Whitney: Can I Be Me; a Great Get Together lunchtime picnic celebrating the life and legacy of Jo Cox MP, before the premiere of Closing Night Film Jo Cox: Death of an MP; and in 2016, the Vogue – Strike a Pose Party, celebrating the premieres of Strike a Pose and Kiki.

Each year also sees the Awards Ceremony usually hosted at Sheffield's Crucible Theatre, honouring the best documentaries of the Festival. Each Festival sees dozens of networking drinks hosted by partners, sponsors and supporters, such as Image Nation Abu Dhabi, The Academy of Motion Picture Arts and Sciences, Shooting People, and many more.

== All-year programme ==
DocFest activities outside of the five-day festival include:

- Films, for example DocFest presents which takes a selection of the Festival's film programme around the UK, and screenings at Latitude Festival.
- Alternate Realities Tours across the UK to various venues and Latitude Festival and internationally. In 2017, DocFest toured Latin America with the 'Realidades Alternativas' exhibition.
- Talks & Sessions across various film festivals, featuring members of the DocFest staff.
- Marketplace & Talent, including ongoing mentoring programme for filmmakers.
- Networking events for filmmakers.
- A structured internship and volunteer programme for young people.

== Festival directors ==
- Annabel Grundy, appointed Managing Director in 2022 under a new joint-leadership model working alongside Creative Director, Raul Niño Zambrano.
- Melanie Iredale, Deputy Director 2014–2018 and later appointed Interim Director in 2019
- Liz McIntyre, 2015–2018
- Heather Croall, 2006–2014
- Brent Woods, 2002–2005
- Kathy Loizou, 1996–2001
- Paula Shirley, 1995
- Midge MacKenzie, 1994

== Chairpersons of the Board of Trustees ==
- Alex Cooke (Chair), 2019–present
- Brian Woods (Deputy Chair) 2016–present
- Alex Graham, 2011–2019
- Steve Hewlett, 2005–2011
- Christo Hird, 2000–2004
- Roger James, 1997–2000
- Marian Bowan, 1996
- Peter Symes, 1994–1995

== Members of the Board of Trustees ==
- Stephen Bowen
- Jo Clinton-Davis
- Gali Gold
- Daniel Gorden
- Fozia Khan
- Jennifer Kimber
- Derren Lawford
- Lucy McDowell
- Sacha Mirzoeff
- Zoe Mumba
- Beejal-Mayer Patel
- Helen Scott
