= Raghda Hassan =

- Died: March 2021
- Occupations: Writer; activist
- Writing career
- Years active: 1980–2021
- Genre: Novels
- Subjects: Political topics; social themes; prison literature
- Notable works: Morning Star; Where no Damascus there

Raghda Hassan (Arabic: رغدة حسن) was a writer and activist from Syria. She became renowned as an opponent of the Syrian dictatorship through her political efforts during the eras of Hafez al-Assad and his son Bashar Al-Assad. She was detained once in each era. Raghda changed to writing at some point and wrote several pamphlets, as well as a large novel titled The Morning Star as an autobiography in which she discussed her upbringing and adolescence, as well as a second novel titled Where there is No Damascus There. It's a novel in the same vein as the first, and it's considered jail literature. Raghda was working on her third novel at the time, but she died of cancer in March 2021 before it was officially released.

== Early life and education ==
Raghda was born in the city of Jableh on the coast of Syria. She was raised in the alleys of Syria with her two brothers, sister and mother, while her father separated for his life away from them. She studied at Saad bin Abi Waqas Primary School, and obtained a middle and high school certificate. But she was prevented from studying at the university for some reason.

== Career ==
Raghda spoke about her story in the novel The Morning Star, where she touched on her childhood, the beginning of her political activity, her experience of being imprisoned twice, and her marriage. She also addressed the issue of her residence in Yarmouk Camp, where she had two children with her husband, Amer.

At some point, Raghda avoided political work after her experiences. However, she did not stop following public affairs. She devoted herself to writing and tried in most of the pieces to talk about her experience and the experiences of others in detention in Syrian prisons. She also wrote about love and other things

Raghda Hassan's renown grew as a result of her book The New Prophets, in which she focused on fluid narration for the sake of narrative structure, as well as lyrical pick-ups. Raghda leaned on realism in her story by providing authentic depictions of people and locations. In her work, Hassan discusses what she refers to as the "dream of liberation" in the hearts of eager young armed only with their live consciences and poetry. Raghda also discusses the stench of clotted blood and her terror of security guards, executioners and dungeons, love, and poetry. Some critics viewed the novel as "warm and personal as it promotes closeness, and premature."

Raghda focuses on the issues of those she refers to as the persecuted in their homeland in this work, as she tells about the expelled, and then regression to the dream, as is the story of Hatem, the protagonist who dies at some point under torture and all the torture and abuse parties he lived before her separation. The novel also describes the systematic torture in Syrian regime jails in significant detail, recounting the use of a triple wire with a German chair and torture equipment imported from Nazi dungeons.

In her novel The New Prophets, Raghda recounts the state of a detainee who reaches the verge of fainting owing to tremendous agony centered in the back and lower extremities, to the point of paralysis. Raghda refers to her Palestinian spouse, Amer Haddad, or, as Amer Al-Fadaei calls it, who bid farewell to the path of battle with many outstanding strong comrades. Raghda Hassan describes in detail her days in jail, torture parties, nail pulling, transfer to the hospital, and return to prison, as well as injuries to her back and feet and a swollen head. Raghda combined the story and the poem in her novel "Where there is no Damascus there," telling a story about sailors, their boats of revolution, and their seas of longing and knowledge, about legends that summed up the meaning and truth of the Syrian in the wounds of the body and the wrinkles of the smile, as described in the introduction.

== Political activism ==
She began her career in political activism at the age of twenty when she and her two brothers began publishing publications opposing the Assad regime in 2012. After a while, Raghda's contacts grew, and a broader number of persons who opposed the dictatorship joined in, subsequently being known as the Communist Action Party.

Raghda Hassan rose to fame in Syria as a result of her novels and political activism. She was detained for the first time in 1992 and imprisoned for more than two years as part of a campaign led by Hafez Al-Assad against opposition organisations including the Communist Action Party. Raghda Hassan was arrested for the second time in 2010 by Syrian government troops while traveling to Lebanon to promote her novel The New Prophets, which depicts Syrian jails. She was beaten during the arrest according to human rights organizations.

== Marriage ==
Raghda Hassan married Palestinian Amer Daoud, who was detained in the same prison. In the documentary A Syrian Love Story, which won the Sheffield Documentary Festival Award in 2015, British director Sean McAllister embodied the love story that brought together Palestinian and Syrian detainees. The film tells the story of activists Amer and Raghda, who met and fell in love in a Syrian prison, and their four children, as well as their flight from Syria's civil war to Lebanon before being granted asylum in France.

== Death ==
Raghda Hassan died in France in March 2021 after a battle with cancer.
