= Starting Point (film) =

- Directed by: Michał Szcześniak
- Produced by: Munk Studio; Polish Film Association
- Starring: Aneta
- Cinematography: Przemysław; Niczyporuk
- Edited by: Acek Tarasiuk; Daniel Gasiorowski
- Production company: Munk Studio
- Distributed by: Polish Film Association
- Release date: 2015
- Country: Poland
- Language: Polish

Starting Point is a 2015 Polish short-documentary film, directed by Michal Szczesniak, who also co-authored the script with Katarzyna Bonda. Cinematography was by Przemysław Niczyporuk, and was co-produced by Munk Studio- SFP and Studio Filmowe N. Michał Szczęśniak. The film was shortlisted with ten other documentaries, from 74 entries, submitted to the 88th Academy Awards in Documentary Short Subject category. The final five nominations were scheduled to be announced on January 14, 2016.

The plot follows a woman, Aneta, who was sentenced to prison at the age of 19 for murder, and after nine years, behind bars, begins working as a caregiver for the elderly. Her new job takes her outside of prison, where she meets Helena who is diagnosed with rheumatism. Conversations with Helena become another starting point for Aneta; a starting point to self-acceptance and changing her life.

Starting Point was shortlisted for an Oscar nomination, for best short documentary film in 2015. Before it was noticed by the American Academy, the film got top prizes in Sheffield and Koszalin. It was also noticed at the Camerimage and Sundance festivals.

== Synopsis ==
Aneta 'rebelled to the max' at the age of nineteen and wound up in prison for murder. Nine years later, her daily routine takes her from behind the walls of the prison to a care home for the elderly. One of the residents, Helena, has been ill ever since infancy, and is quite fascinated by Aneta. In her opinion, the young woman has everything she could want. Helena, whose knowledge of the world has come “from the windows of hospitals and coaches”, avidly asks Aneta about her life. A test awaits Aneta, on whether or not her life will change for the better, as a result of their sincere conversations with Helena.

== Awards ==
- Short Documentary Award - 2015 Sheffield Doc/Fest
- Golden Frog Grand Prix for Short Documentary - 22nd IFF Camerimage
- Doc/Short Main Prize - Docudays UA Ukraine 2015
- 33rd Młodzi i Film Festival - Best Documentary Short
- 2015 Documenta Madrid Festival
