= Charlie Phillips (producer) =

British media producer

Charles R. Phillips
- Born: November 27, 1980; Leeds
- Occupation: Head of video, The Guardian

Charlie Phillips is a British documentary producer and filmmaker. He was head of documentary acquisition and production at The Guardian until 2019, and a former deputy director of Sheffield Doc/Fest in the United Kingdom.

== Early life and career ==
Phillips was born in Leeds, UK. After working at various jobs in the TV and film industry, Phillips set up a short film night in London. He became the editor of Channel 4’s BAFTA-winning online documentary channel, FourDocs.

In 2008 he joined Doc/Fest as marketplace director, organising the annual MeetMarket pitching event. After seeing 5 Broken Cameras pitched in Tel Aviv in 2010, Phillips brought it to the MeetMarket. It went on to be nominated for an Academy Award.

Phillips is a proponent of crowdfunding and digital distribution for documentaries. In 2012 Phillips led a successful crowdfunding campaign for Sheffield Doc/Fest. He was promoted to deputy director in 2013. At the 2012 Doc/Fest, Phillips participated in a panel discussion about corporate funding of documentaries. He has appeared on BBC Radio 4's The Film Programme.

In September, 2014, Phillips left his position at Doc/Fest to work for The Guardian, as head of its documentary acquisition and production department.
