= A Syrian Love Story =

- Film poster
- Directed by: Sean McAllister
- Produced by: Elhum Shakerifar; Sean McAllister
- Edited by: Matt Scholes
- Music by: Terence Dunn
- Distributed by: Cinema Politica (Canada)
- Release date: 18 September 2015 (UK)
- Running time: 76 mins.
- Countries: UK; Syria
- Languages: English; Arabic

A Syrian Love Story is a 2015 British documentary by Sean McAllister, detailing the hardships of a family in modern-day Syria.

== Synopsis ==
Amer met Raghda in a Syrian prison fifteen years ago. When released, they got married and started a family together, only to be torn apart by the Assad dictatorship. At ages four and fourteen, their children Bob and Kaka have already spent their whole lives watching either of their parents go to prison for their political beliefs.

== Production ==
Filming began in 2009, prior to the revolutions in Arab countries – at the time, Raghda was a political prisoner and Amer was caring for their children alone. It was filmed in the Yarmouk Camp in Damascus, infamous for its treatment of inhabitants, which included starvation.

== Reception ==
The film received very positive reviews. On the review aggregator website Rotten Tomatoes, 92% of 13 critics' reviews are positive, with an average rating of 8.2/10.

Peter Bradshaw of The Guardian gave the film five stars and said, 'McAllister shows us the human cost of a geopolitical tragedy; he shows us that “refugees” are not just nameless pathetic mendicants whose only desire is pity. They are as intelligent and complex as the EU citizens glimpsing them on the news. It is a compelling film.' Trevor Johnston of Time Out gave the film four stars and said, ' ‘A Syrian Love Story’ presents us first with the gnawing anxiety of life under the ruthless Al-Assad regime, then the fresh challenges of a fractious, painful exile where damaged minds take time to heal, before we finally see the household become distant observers to the destruction of their homeland and the deaths of many friends.'

== Awards and nominations ==
List of Accolades
| Award / Film Festival | Category | Recipient(s) | Result |
|---|---|---|---|
| 2015 Biografilm Festival | Jury Special Mention | Sean McAllister | Won |
| 2015 BAFTA | Outstanding Debut By A British Writer, Director or Producer | Sean McAllister | Nominated |
| 2015 Sheffield Doc/Fest | Grand Jury Prize | Sean McAllister | Won |

== See also ==
- Little Syria (film)
