= Thank You for the Rain =

Thank You For The Rain
- Produced by: Hugh Hartford
- Music by: Christopher White
- Release date: 2017
- Country: Kenya
- Language: English

Thank You for the Rain is a 2017 feature-length documentary film made by Kenyan farmer Kisilu Musya and Julia Dahr, a Norwegian filmmaker. It was produced by Hugh Hartford. The film follows Musya over five years as he uses his camera to capture the life of his family, his village and the damages of climate change.

The film had its world-premiere at Copenhagen International Documentary Festival, and has since toured more than 80 festivals. The film has sold to over 60 countries, earlier versions of the film were bought by Al Jazeera and NRK, and screened at the 2015 United Nations Climate Change Conference in Paris. The film is a co-production between Differ Media and Banyak Films.

== Reception ==
Thank You for the Rain has received acclaim by critics. The film has won several awards including Best Documentary at the Kenyan Kalasha Awards and two awards at Social Impact Media Awards in 2018. The film has won 16 awards, and has competed at 28 international festivals.

- Winner: Best Cinematography, Women in Film and Television, Canada 2019
- Winner: Basil Wright Film Prize, Rai Film Festival, UK 2019
- Winner: Best film on sustainable development, Millenium Film Festival, 2018 Belgium
- Winner: Best Story, Naturvision Film Festival 2018
- Winner: Ethos Jury Prize, Social Media Impact Awards, United States 2018
- Winner: Best Cinematography, Social Media Impact Awards, United States 2018
- Winner: The Main Prize of the Minister of the Environment, IFF Ekofilm, Chzech Republic 2018
- Winner: Best Documentary Film, Kalasha Film and TV Awards, Kenya 2018
- Winner: WWF Award, Thessaloniki Documentary Festival, Greece 2018
- Winner: Best Movie, Nuovi Sguardi, Italy 2018
- Winner: Jury Prize, Another Way Film festival, Spain 2017
- Winner: Osiris FAO Prize, Agrofilm, Slovakia 2017
- Winner: Fethi Kayaalp Grand Award, Bozcaada International Festival of Ecological Documentary, Turkey 2017
- Winner: Jury Award, Alimenterre Film Festival, Belgium 2017
- Winner: Pangolin Power Film Award, Eco Film Festival, Singapore 2017
- Winner: Best Feature Documentary, FICMEC, Spain 2017

== Impact ==
In 2017, the filmmakers launched an international impact campaign "aiming to build climate resilient communities, strengthen the climate justice movement, and push policymakers to take steps to stop climate change and support frontline communities." In 2019 and 2020, the Climate Justice Resilience Fund provided a grant to expand the reach of the film, both for policy advocacy and grassroots initiatives.

A 2019 Doc Society report stated the film was featured in 190 community screenings in 22 countries. The impact screenings in Mutomo, Kenya, led to the construction of an earth dam, which is now a water source for about 300 households. The screenings also inspired the formation of 30 new tree planting groups.
