= Little Syria (film) =

- Directed by: Madalina Rosca; Reem Karssli
- Produced by: Paul Arne Wagner; Madalina Rosca
- Cinematography: Reem Karssli; David Simon Gross
- Music by: Andrei Kivu
- Production companies: Make a Point, Passport Productions
- Release date: 22 March 2025 (CPH:DOX)
- Running time: 90 minutes
- Countries: Portugal, Romania, Germany
- Language: English

Little Syria is a 2025 documentary film directed by Madalina Rosca and Reem Karssli and produced by Paul Arne Wagner and Madalina Rosca. The film had its world premiere on March 22, 2025, at CPH:DOX, and it follows the story of a brother, his sister and her boyfriend, trapped between a Syria from which they ran for their lives, and a Europe which at times embraces them, and at others pushes them back.

Since its world premiere in March 2025, the documentary had its continental premieres in Latin America, in Buenos Aires, Argentina at the 21st International Film Festival of Human Rights, in Africa at Zanzibar International Film Festival, in Australia at Sydnay.Doc, but also in Germany, in Romania at (TIFF), in Greece, in Ukraine at Kyiv International Film Festival "Molodist", in France at Montpellier Film Festival, in Portugal at Porto/Post/Doc and other countries. The film's screenings sparked discussions and controversies, especially on topics such as migration and refugees, with the creation of side-events such as the talks with Search and Rescue representatives of the organisation SOS Humanity, or talks with Hungarian director András S. Takács.

Asked by journalist Cédric Lépine about the policies in Germany and Europe regarding the reception of refugees and the condemnation of crimes in Syria, the producer of Little Syria, Paul Arne Wagner, answered: "There is no coherent policy [...] the political discourse has deteriorated and changed completely. The 'We can do it' of the past has been replaced in the discourse of the current Chancellor Friedrich Merz by thinly veiled racist insults, insinuating that certain people have no place in the German 'urban landscape' and will soon have to leave. This rhetoric is painfully close to the calls for forced re-emigration that were once an extremist position on the fringes of the so-called identitarian movement. The normalisation of such dehumanising rhetoric in just a few years should frighten us all."

== Production ==
Including footage filmed for over the course of 20 years in Syria and Germany, as well as in Turkey, Greece, Poland, Hungary and Spain, the production of Little Syria came to an end with the fall of the Assad Regime. The film is produced by the non-profit organisation Make a Point alongside Passport Productions and with post-production support from Abator in Bucharest.

== Release ==
CPH:DOX unveiled its line-up on February 17, 2025, with Little Syria in the Human:Rights Award competition.

The film had its world premiere at CPH:DOX on March 22, 2025, with special curation from The Youth Editorial Group, an editorial team of curators creating film events that engage people across different life experiences, with the declared goal "to challenge the festival's fixed framework and reformulate what we see as pressing issues – from global crises to personal testimonies and artistic expression". On March 26, 2025, in order to highlight the focus on the situation in Syria and mark its solidarity with the Syrian people - in Denmark, Syria and the rest of the world, The Youth Editorial Group in collaboration with the non-profit organization Finjan organised the event "Syria in Focus", following a screening of the documentary film "Little Syria" with a concert of the Syrian-Palestinian music group OUD AND VOICE.

Debate with the team behind Little Syria

It went on to have its German Premiere at Doxumentale'25 in Berlin, Latin American Premiere at 21.International Film Festival on Human Rights in Buenos Aires, Romanian Premiere at 24. Transilvania International Film Festival in Cluj, African Premiere at 27. Zanzibar International Film Festival (Festival of the Dhow Countries), Greek Premiere at 12. International Documentary Festival of Ierapetra, Italian Premiere at 16. Middle East Now Festival in Florence, French Premiere in 47. Cinemed in Montpellier, North African Premiere in 29. International Author Film Festival in Rabat, Ukrainian premiere at 54. Molodist International Film Festival in Kyiv

== Reception ==
In an interview for the Modern Times Magazine, the CPH:DOX Head of Programme, Mads Mikkelsen, highlited the need of Film Festivals to identify key subjects about what is happening in the world, like the one in Little Syria, stating:

"When global attention is focused on specific crises—Ukraine and Gaza, for example—we also make an effort to highlight other, sometimes overlooked, crises. One example is the film Little Syria premiering this year in the Human Rights competition. Syria has been a recurring subject at CPH:DOX for years, but with the fall of Assad, we felt it was crucial to include a film that addressed this new chapter. Thankfully, we found Little Syria, which does just that".

In her review for Modern Times Magazine about Little Syria, Bianca-Olivia Nita called it "less a film than a long, trembling line, tracing two decades of filmed memory [...]. Much of its strength unfolds in the spaces between words, where the true emotional weight resides".

The Italian independent film magazine Taxidrivers stated (in a review by film critic Benedetta Pomilio) that, in order "to understand the power of Little Syria, it's crucial to rewind to 2011, when Syria erupted in one of the Arab world's most dramatic" revolution: "The directors, Mădălina Roșca and Reem Karssli, impose a discipline of slowness, rejecting the voyeurism of "tragedy cinema" in favor of an ethical staging".

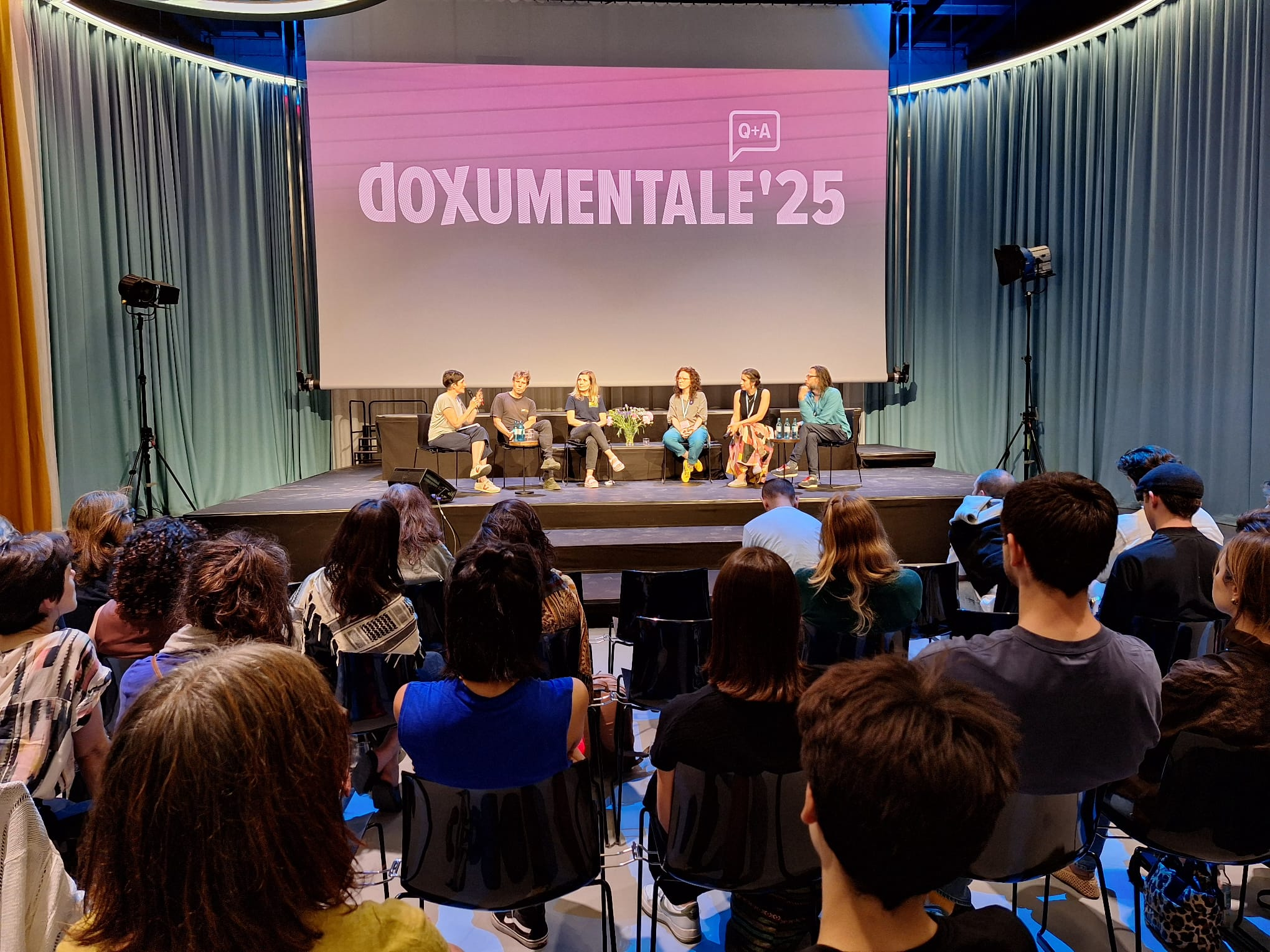
SOS Humanity, Anabel Bermejo and the authors of Little Syria at Atelier Gardens in Berlin

”A work of great testimonial value”, Argentinian curator and film director Ornella Martina Zanoni wrote.” Cédric Lépine commented in the French publication Mediapart: "To avoid becoming accustomed to murderous dictatorial regimes, this documentary highlights the years-long work of men and women who never surrender to the impotent geopolitics which accommodates what is intolerable for humanity.".

Andreas Busche referred to Little Syria in Tagesspiegel as ”a reminder of history.”

The Berliner called it ”a moving portrait of Syrian refugees”, while in The Spot Media film critic Patrick Heidmann referred to Little Syria as a film ”no way to be missed”..

Romanian cultural journalist Andreea Docea, in an article in the Romanian weekly Dilema, appreciated Little Syria as being ”A film-statement for human rights”. In his review for Films in Frame, film critic Victor Morozov called the documentary ”a memorial composed of clear cinematic choices, many of which seem designed to quickly construct an extremely complex reality, together weaving the many threads into a concise portrait of a shattered nation”.

Film historian Wolfgang Martin Hamdorf uttered on his show on Kultur Heute (Culture Today) on the German National Radio/ Deutschlandfunk: "In Little Syria, filmmaker Reem Karssli tells her and her generation's story, from the Syrian uprising in 2012, to the persecution and expulsion of the opponents of the regime and to the mass exodus. Little Syria is a film about the Syrian diaspora, not about the people in Syria itself."

"No question, exile is part of our personality, we are a mix between here and there, we're not Germans, not Syrians, we are a mixture, with a past, with a future.", declared Reem Karssli for Deutschlandfunk.

== Awards ==
Little Syria was awarded the Giovanni lo Porto Award for Human Rights in the We World Festival in Bolognia and the Swiss Embassy Award for Peace (Premio Ambasciata Swizzera per la Pace).
