= Tudor Square =

City square in Sheffield, England

Coordinates: 53°22′50″N 1°28′03″W

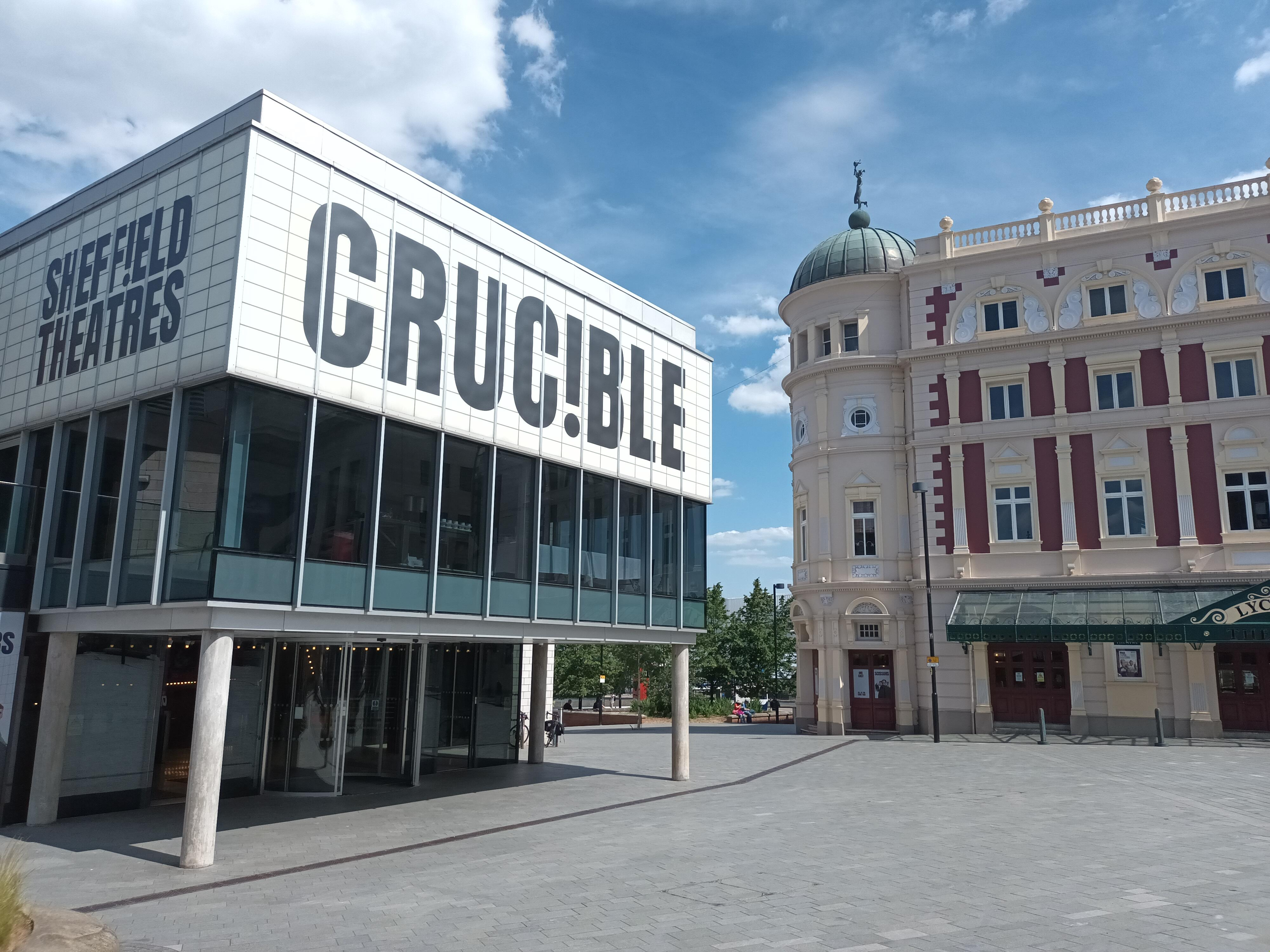
Tudor Square with the Crucible and Lyceum Theatres

Tudor Square is a city square in the city of Sheffield, England. The square is home to the largest concentration of theatres in the UK outside London and has thus become known as Sheffield's ‘Theatre Land’. The Square lies at the heart of the city centre, only metres away from the town hall, major attractions such as the Winter Gardens and is only 5 minutes away from Sheffield railway station.

== History ==
Despite being in existence for a long time, Tudor Square only became known as a public square in 1991 when the City Council sought to improve the urban landscape in the city centre in preparation for the 1991 World Student Games, held in Sheffield. Before the redevelopment the square had served as part open space, part car park and was mostly unrecognised. The new square was opened by the Lord Mayor of Sheffield on 7 June 1991 and has since seen several further redevelopments.

== "Theatreland" ==
View from the South end of the square

Tudor Square has always been home to theatres. The Lyceum, Sheffield's second oldest theatre, sits on the east side of the square. On the north side of the square is the Crucible, the venue for the World Snooker Championships since 1977. Also within the square is the smaller Studio Theatre which, along with the two aforementioned theatres, is managed by Sheffield Theatres.

To the immediate west on Surrey Street lies the Library Theatre, which, managed by Sheffield City Council, lies within the city's central library. Also on Surrey Street is the Montgomery Theatre, which is owned by Montgomery Arts & Christian Centre Sheffield Ltd, a cross-denominational Christian organisation.

Sheffield city centre's other main venue, the City Hall, is located close by on Barker's Pool.

== Tudor Square and Crucible redevelopment ==
In 2010 Tudor Square was modernised with funds provided by the European Regional Development Fund via Yorkshire Forward. For the project £4 million was allocated to redevelop the square to coincide with the refurbished and redesigned Crucible theatre. The aim of the project was to provide Sheffield Theatres Trust with an open public space for cultural activity and create an impressive new gateway to the city.

The refurbishment of the Crucible theatre was also partially funded by Yorkshire Forward and cost £15 million to complete. The aim of this particular project was to improve the night time economy of the city centre, something which the theatre has done so for its entire history. The redevelopment will, amongst other things, provide a much improved venue for the world snooker championships which are held there annually.
