= Sean McAllister (filmmaker) =

British documentary filmmaker (born 1965)

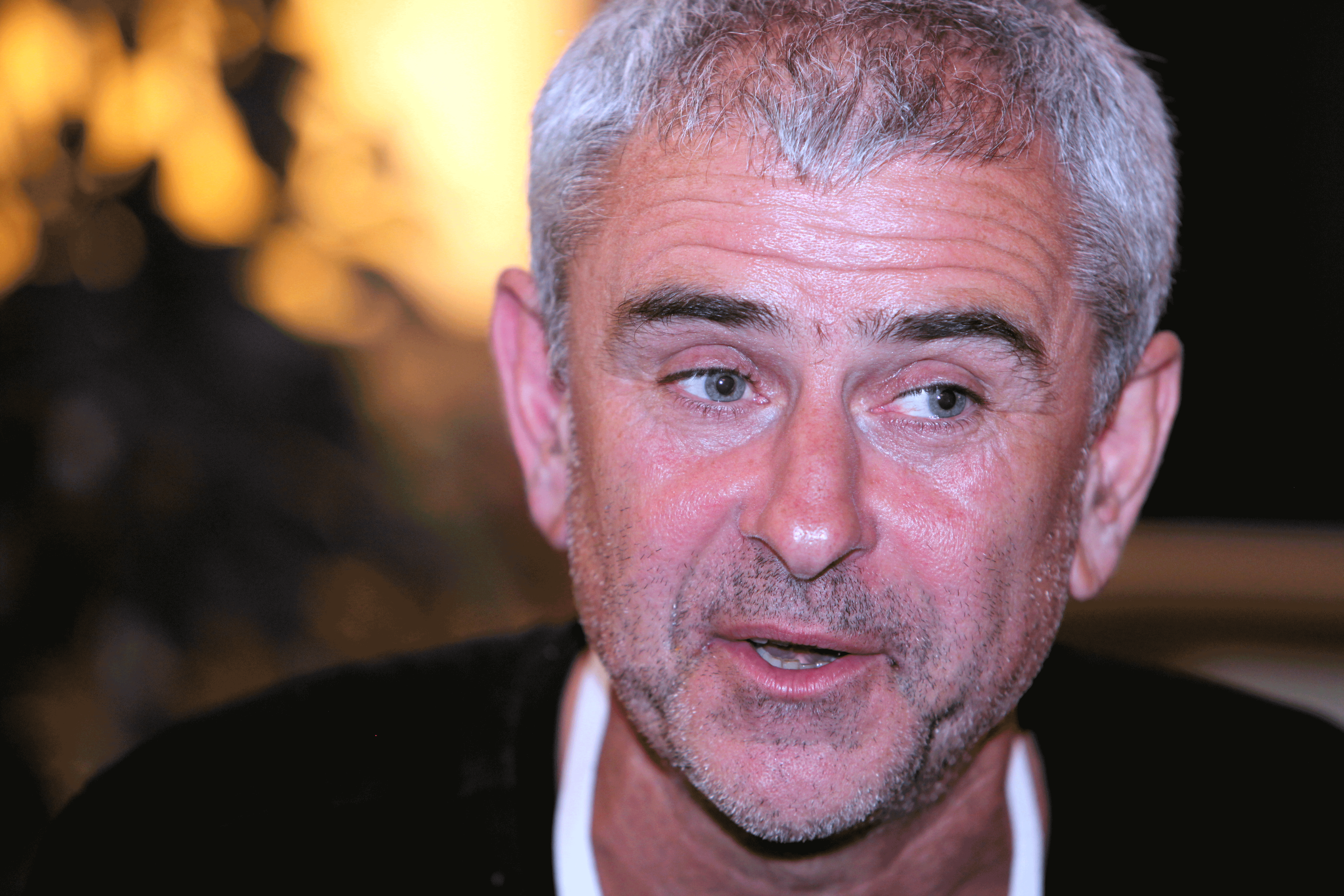
- Born: Sean McAllister; 2 May 1965 (age 61); Kingston upon Hull, England
- Education: National Film and Television School
- Occupation: Filmmaker
- Partner: Ruth Tilley
- Children: Harry McAllister and 2 Others
- Website: seanmcallister.com

Sean McAllister (born 2 May 1965) is a British documentary filmmaker.

== Filmography ==
- Flyingdales (1988) – Frontier Films
- Toxic Waste (1988) – Frontier Films
- Hessle Road (1988) – Frontier Films
- A Passing Thought (1989) – Frontier Films
- The Season (1990) – Homemade Films
- Crematorium (1993) – NFTS
- Life with Brian (1994) – NFTS
- Hitting (1995) – NFTS
- Just People (1995 / 1998) – NFTS / Channel 4
- Shoot out in Swansea (1997) – Vagabond Films / BBC
- Working for the Enemy (1997) – Mosaic Films / BBC2
- The Minders (1998) – BBC Modern Times
- Settlers (2000) – Channel 4 True Stories
- Hull's Angel (2002) – Channel 4 True Stories
- The Liberace of Baghdad (2004) – Tenfoot Films
- Japan: A Story of Love and Hate (2008) – Tenfoot Films
- The Reluctant Revolutionary (2012) – Tenfoot Films
- A Syrian Love Story (2014) – Tenfoot Films
- A Northern Soul (2018) – Tenfoot Films

== Awards ==
- Winner, Special Jury Prize, Sundance Film Festival 2005
- Winner, Best Ethnographic/Anthropological Film Boulder International Film Festival
- Special Jury Prize, Chicago International Documentary Festival
- Winner, Special award for the most valuable film on refugees, Cinema for Peace Foundation
- Winner of the Champ-Dollon Women’s Jury Prize at the 22d FIFDH for A Northern Soul.

== See also ==
- Lists of directors and producers of documentaries
