= Architecture of Cuba =

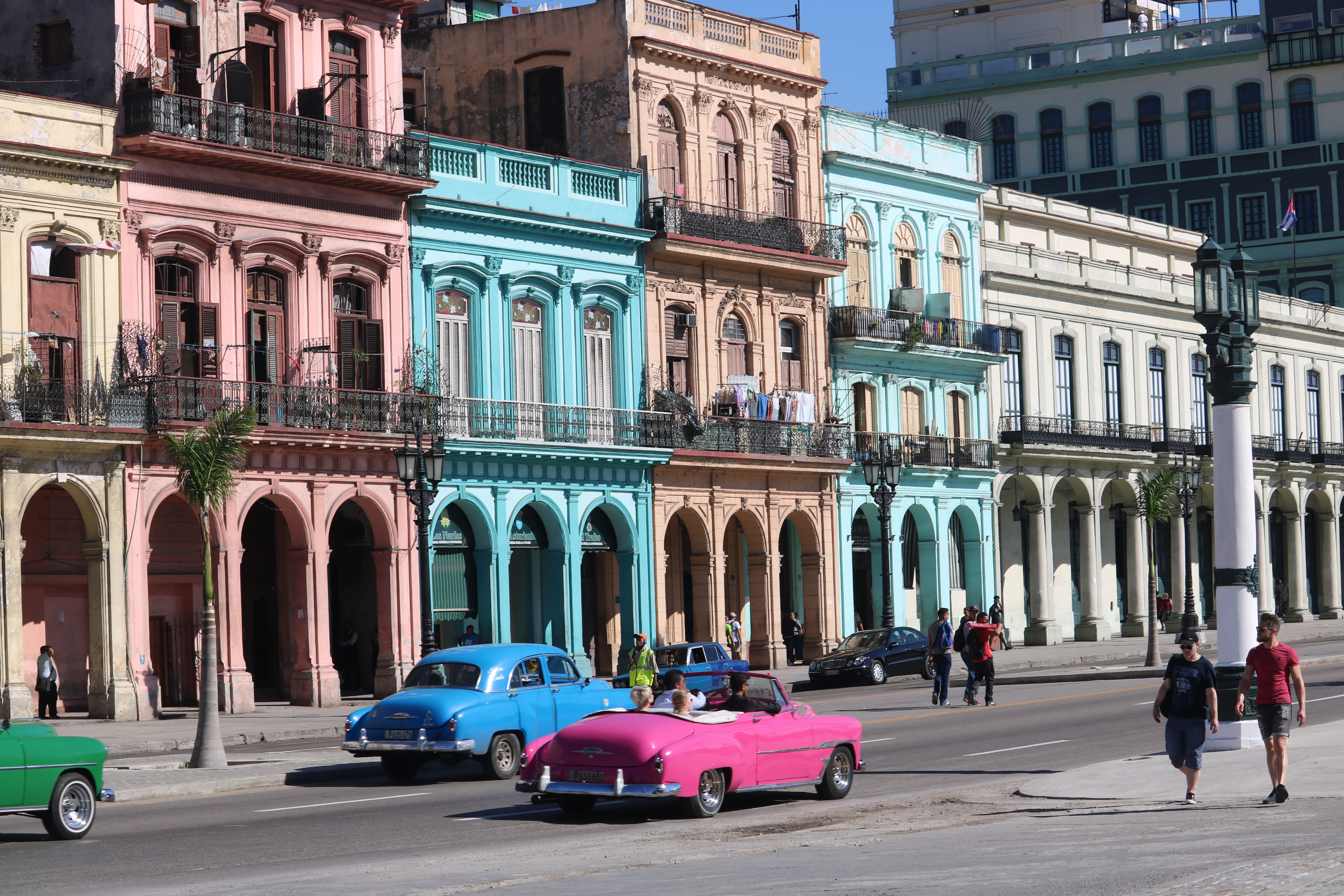
Colourful and eclectic Colonial street architecture in Havana, the capital of Cuba

Architecture of Cuba refers to the buildings, structures and architectural history throughout the Caribbean island nation of Cuba. The unique mix of cultural and artistic influences throughout history have led to Cuba being renowned for its eclectic and diverse architecture, which can be defined as a unique fusion of numerous well-studied architectural styles from around the world.

After being circumnavigated by navigator Sebastián de Ocampo in 1508, Cuba was settled by the Spanish in 1511. Being ruled by Spain for more than 400 years following this, Cuban structural architecture is therefore deeply reflective of this colonial period. Various historical events throughout this time, such as trade liberalisation due to major trade reforms in 1778 and 1791 as well as an increase in immigration, contributed to further structural and artistic influences. This includes the seamless fusion of both Neoclassical and Baroque architectural styles into Cuban design.

Following the colonial period, Cuba continued to see diverse architectural pursuits into the 20th century. This was mainly due to increased funding into architectural projects because of national prosperity from high sugar exports during World War I. The Art Deco period is also a notable reference point for Cuban architecture prior to the turn of the century.

In modern times, Cuban architecture is continually celebrated by historians and tourists alike. Contemporary issues such as privatisation and how architecture itself is viewed as a profession in Latin America are both relevant topics when considering the future of Cuban architecture.

== Early history ==
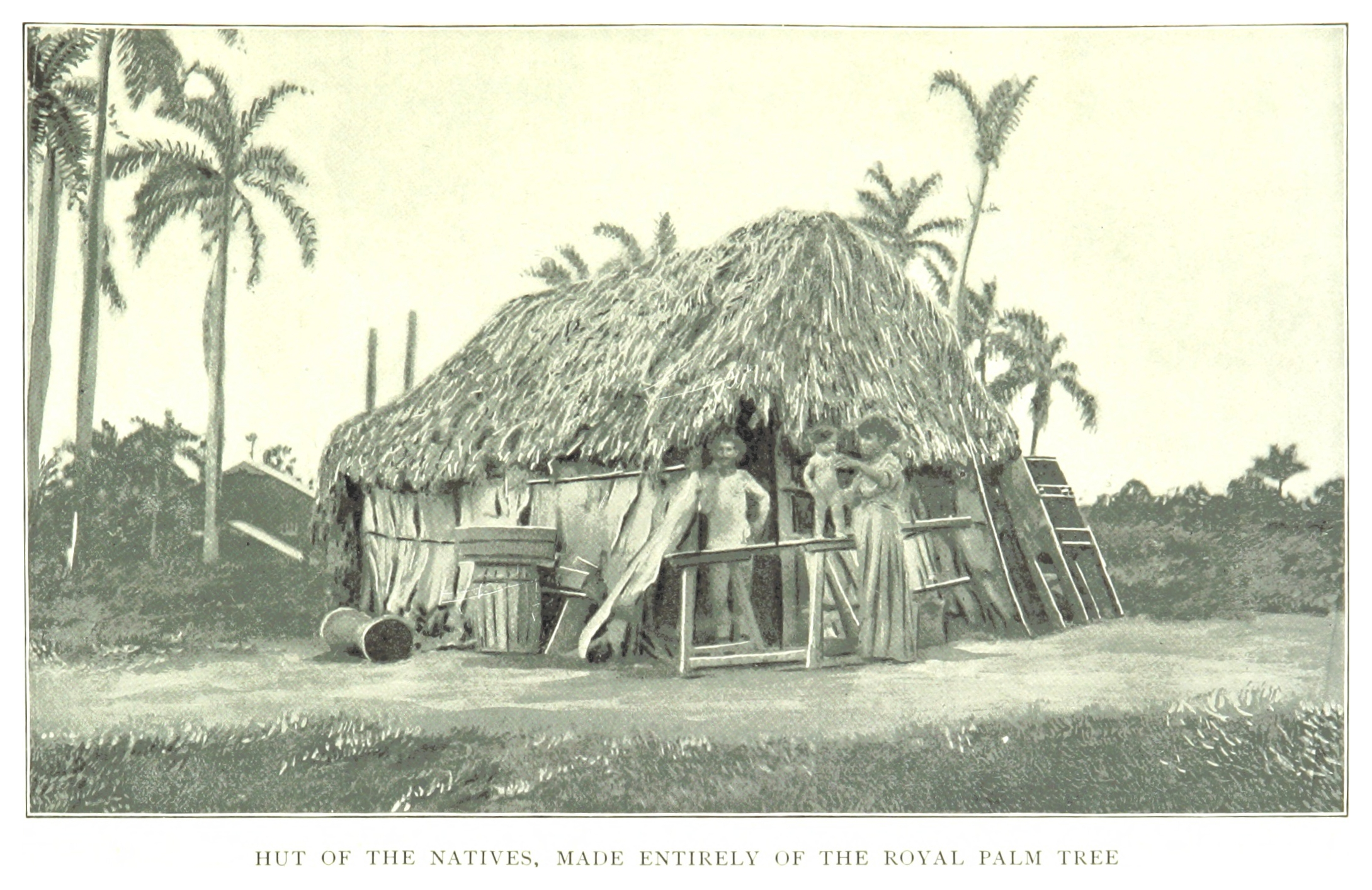
A palm tree hut made by Native Indians in Cuba, showcasing the early history of Cuban architecture.

Prior to Christopher Columbus landing in Cuba in 1492, the island was inhabited by Ciboney Indians and Arawak Indians who had migrated around the Caribbean. Thus, early architecture in Cuba was rudimentary and based on the culture and lifestyle of these hunter-gatherer groups. Groups during this Indigenous migration were non-hierarchal and focused on agriculture, and lived in three main types of makeshift housing. This included Caney shelters, Barbacoa (the first Pilotis) and Bohío huts, all constructed from palm trees and leaves.

The first official settlement in Cuba was not until 1511, led by governor Don Diego Velazquez, and as such, there are limited architectural remains in Cuba from before the Colonial Period. Furthermore, the use of palm leaves as a principal material means rudimentary architectural pursuits were quickly replaced by more permanent construction led by Spanish settlers.

== Colonial period (1511–1898) ==
Colonial architecture in Cuba refers to the buildings and structures that were created during Spanish colonisation. As Cuba was minimally impacted by the destruction of World War I and World War II, these structures remain relatively intact. The key trends of this era include military structures and fortifications, as well as Neoclassicism influenced by European trends.

The preservation of key colonial structures has also been facilitated by the nomination of Old Havana, known locally as Habana Vieja, as a UNESCO World Heritage Site in 1982. Old Havana refers to the southwest coast of Cuba, where Havana was originally founded in the 16th century by Panfilo de Narvaez, a Spanish conquistador. According to UNESCO, Havana is "the most impressive historical city centre in the Caribbean and one of the most notable in the American continent as a whole." Old Havana is therefore a region abundant with historical architecture from this period, including both military Fortifications and Spanish colonial works.

=== Military architecture ===
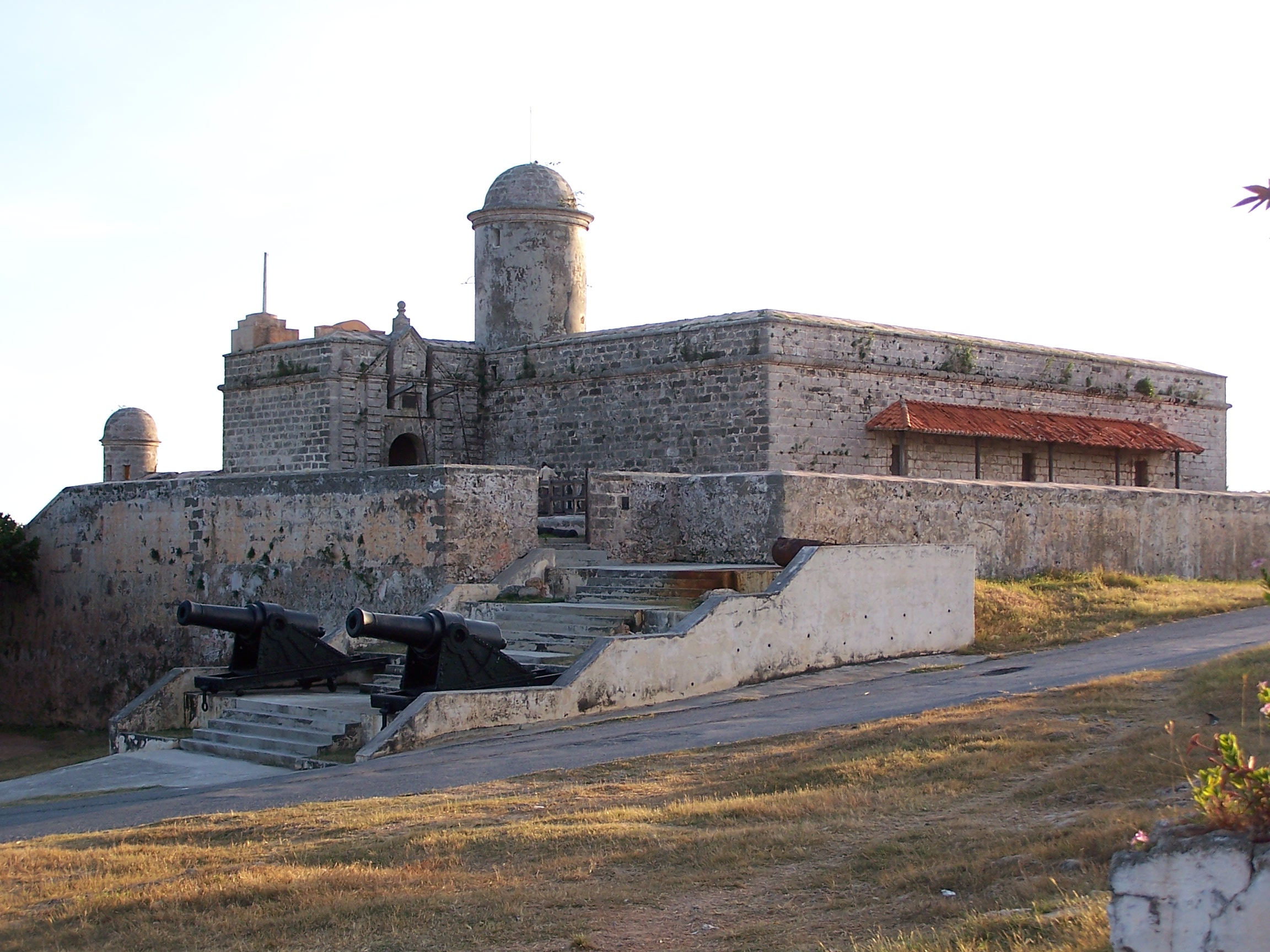
Castillo de Jagua in Cienfuegos, a typical example of military architecture from the Colonial period.

The Colonial Period was characterised by volatility, meaning military architecture from this period is notable. Military architecture can be defined as the complex structures and Fortifications designed to protect a region during unwanted attacks. Italian engineer Battista Antonelli was the first to introduce this style of Renaissance military structures to Cuba, which he designed and built just prior to the beginning of the 17th century. Antonelli's work included the Castillo de Ios Tres Reyes del Morrow and the Castillo San Salvador de la Punta, both located in Havana. These structures were also both recognised by UNESCO as World Heritage listed fortifications in 1982.

La Cabaña fort in Havana is another key example of military architecture, driven by elements of French design and therefore a reflection of the Franco-Spanish alliance that impacted Colonial Cuba. Taking over 10 years to build and covering 10 hectares of land, this fortification is the largest Spanish military structure in both North and South America.

=== Baroque ===
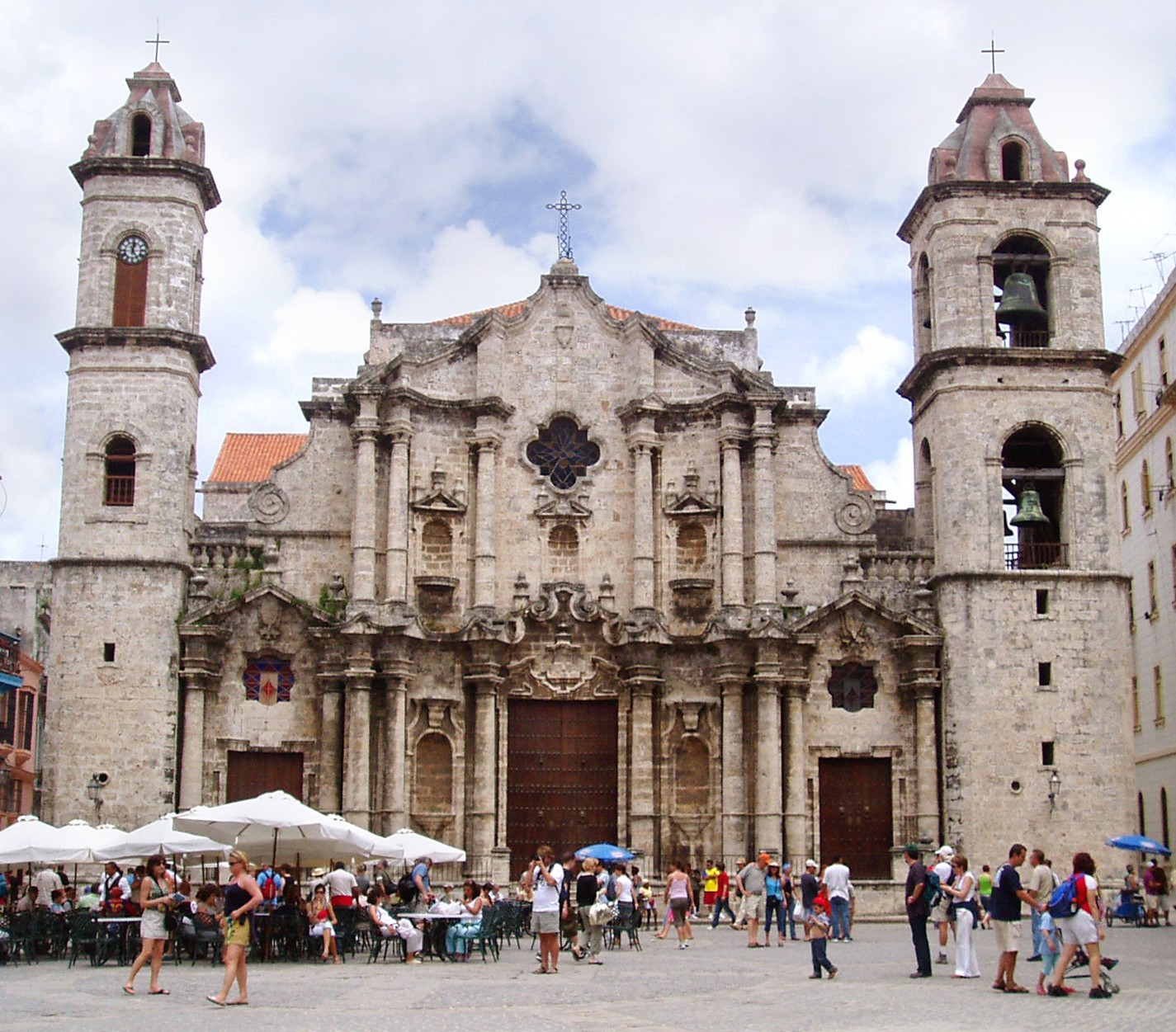
The Havana Cathedral, constructed 1748–77, featuring elements of Baroque design including two towers and a theatrical facade.

Baroque architecture began to influence Cuban projects in the mid-1700s, approximately 50 years after its initial introduction as an architectural style in Italy. While traditional baroque is defined by grandeur, intricate embellishments and royal palaces, the Cuban style was adapted to include recognisable 'tropical' features. Baroque projects in Cuba are also considered to be a simplified version of European Baroque due to a lack of skilled craftsmen in the country. Contrary to Europe, African slaves were responsible for constructing the majority of architectural projects in Cuba throughout the 17th and 18th centuries.

This modified style of Baroque architecture in Cuba, known as Spanish Baroque, includes an array of characteristic traits. For example, rejas were metal bars on windows that enabled improved air circulation, which was evidently a unique geographic requirement for the Cuban landscape. Similarly, sheltered walkways were added to traditional grand Baroque exteriors, known as portales, in order to provide protection from the Cuban sun and rain. One of the most prominent Baroque designs in Cuba is the Cathedral of Havana, constructed from 1748 until 1777. The cathedral was influenced by Francesco Borromini, who was one of the most celebrated architects of the Roman Baroque era.

=== Neoclassicism ===
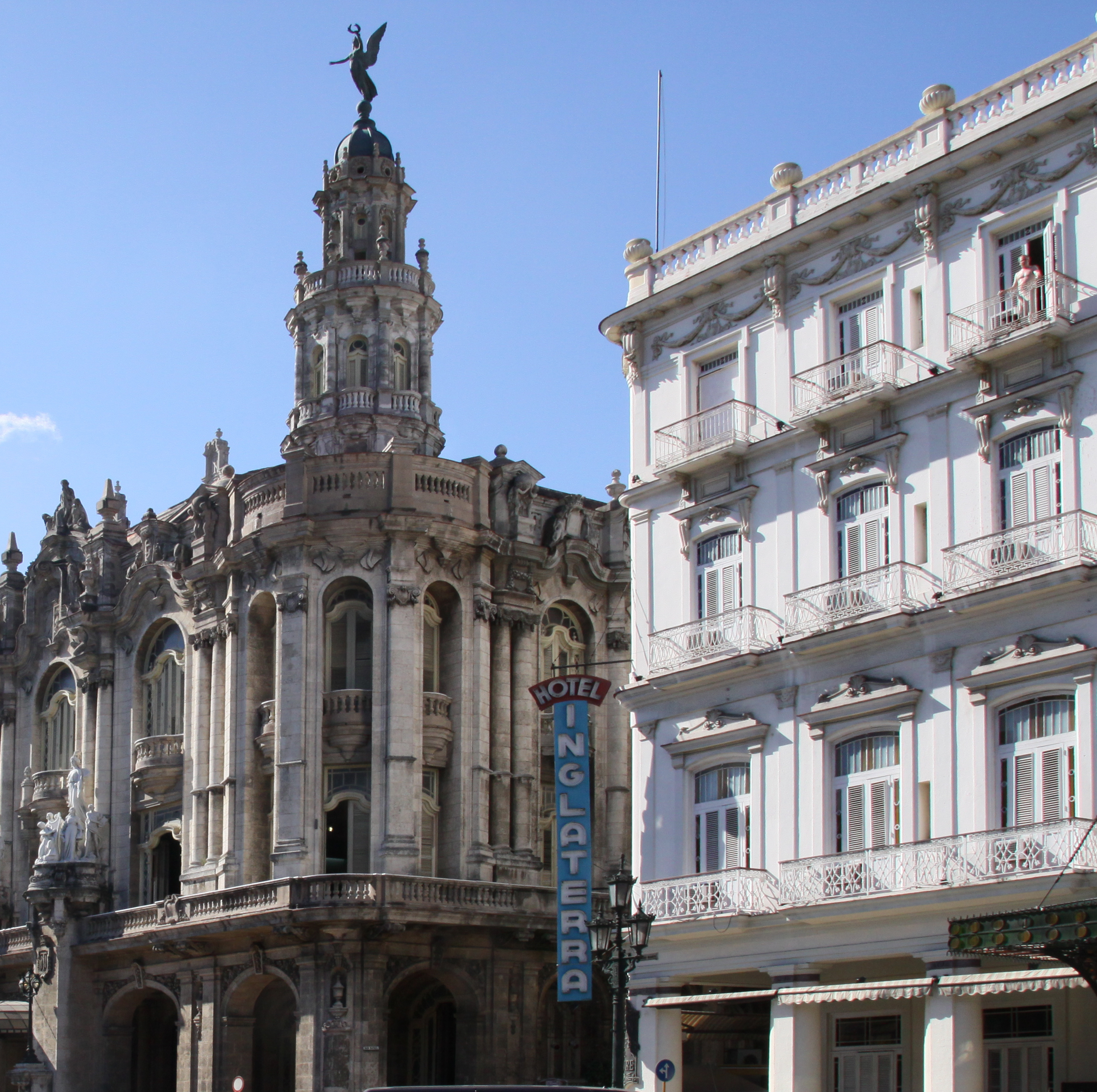
The symmetrical and proportional Hotel Inglaterra in Havana, as per Neoclassical trends.

Due to an increase of French immigrants to Cuba in the 19th century, Cuban architecture also became highly influenced by neoclassicism, which was reflective of architectural projects taking place in France. The city of Cienfuegos, located on the south coast, was greatly impacted by these trends, and is considered one of the most neoclassical cities in Cuba. The city was founded by French immigrants in 1819, and features neoclassical styles such as elegant facades and pastel colouring.

In the nation's capital of Havana, notable neoclassical buildings include the El Template and the Hotel Inglaterra. The buildings of Vedado, a district in Havana established in 1859, also reflect the popularity of neoclassicism in Cuba during this period. This is demonstrated by the 'balanced proportions' of all structures in the district, which is a recognisable characteristic of Neoclassical design. Neoclassical architectural features such as symmetry also began appearing by the mid-19th century throughout other Cuban cities, such as Trinidad and Camagüey.

Neoclassicism also became popular in urban design and residential projects during this period. Many homes in and around Old Havana followed traditional Cuban design principles, but were complemented by subtle neoclassical ironwork and columns. By the late 19th-century, homes in the neighbourhoods of Cerro and El Vedado had become heavily influenced by neoclassical design, featuring modern structures and spacious gardens.

== 20th century ==
The architecture of Cuba throughout the 20th century took influence from visiting architects from around the world, and is therefore characterised by international artistic trends such as the Art Nouveau and Art Deco styles. Political and Social changes also led to an increase in public works, and thus civil architecture from this period is notable. Cuba also saw a building boom post-revolution due to an influx of wealth, with architectural choices that reflect the values held by Cuban society at the time.

=== Art Nouveau and Art Deco ===
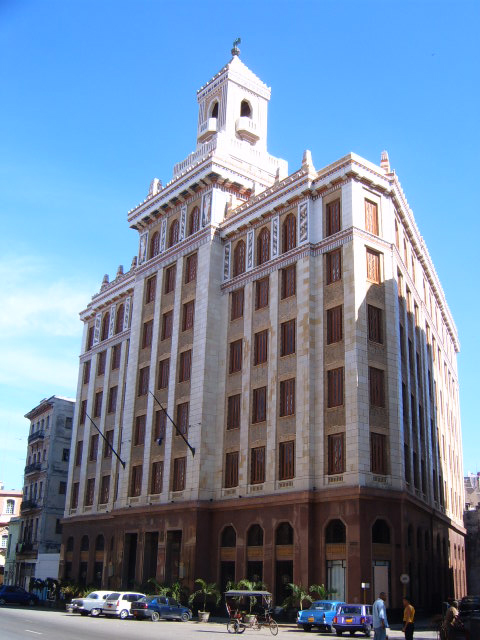
The geometric focus of Art Deco architecture can be seen through the Bacardi Building, Havana 2006.

In an attempt to keep up with fast developing cultural styles abroad, Cuba was quick to follow the trend of Art Nouveau and Art Deco architecture at the beginning of the 20th century.

Art Nouveau, which translates from French as 'new' art, was an ornamental style of architecture that become immensely popular in Europe at the Turn of the century. The style was first introduced in Cuba due to the 1905 Paris Exhibition.

Art Deco inspiration was soon to follow, becoming a stylistic choice for both public and residential designs by private Architects in Cuba, particularly in the 1930s. A key example of this is The Bacardi Building, located in Havana, which is celebrated as an iconic building that draws inspiration from the Art Deco period. The result of an architectural design competition, the building is characterised by its marble and red granite facade. The Bacardi Building was also the very first skyscraper to be built in the city of Havana.

=== Civil architecture ===
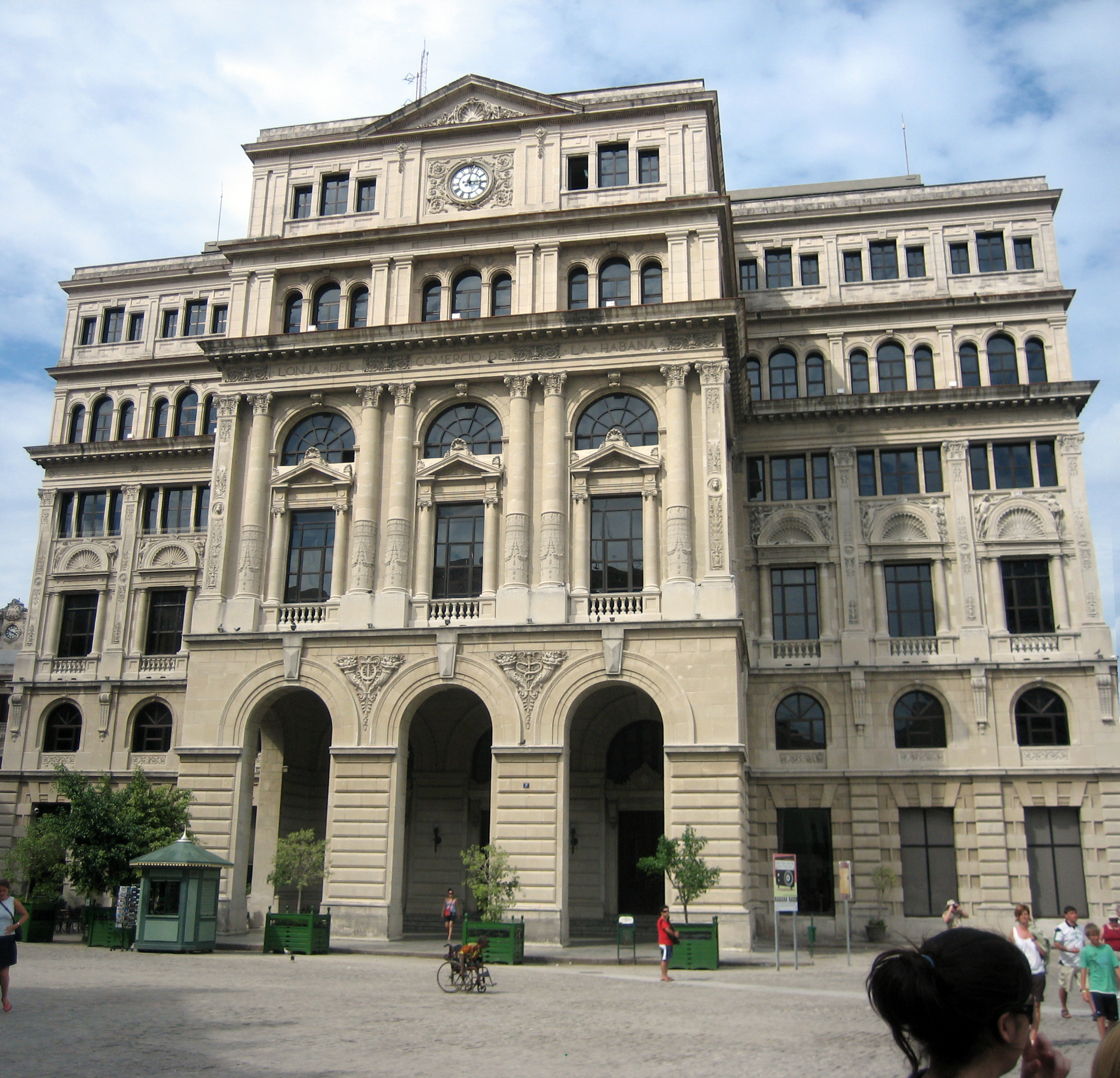
Lonja del Comercio building in Havana, intentionally designed for civil use as a bank and Stock exchange.

After reaching independence in 1902, Cuba saw an immense building boom, with a particular focus on civil works. This was largely driven by an increase in population, with the number of residents in the capital of Havana doubling from 1900 to 1930, mostly due to new laws which facilitated higher rates of immigration.

The Lonja del Comercio building was constructed in 1908 by architects Tomás Our and José Mata to be used as a commercial bank and stock exchange. The design, featuring a high Renaissance inspired facade, was a reflection of new architectural preferences at the beginning of the 20th century.

Similarly, the mid-20th century was also characterised by a tourism boom, which favoured the development of hotel architecture. Key examples include the Havana Riveria Hotel, built in 1957, and the Habana Hilton hotel. The Habana Hilton, now known as the Hotel Tryp Habana Libre, was designed by North American architect Welton Becket.

=== Post revolution (1959–1999) ===
Due to strict government regulation following the Cuban Revolution, the need for extensive planning and government approval significantly slowed architectural development. Furthermore, the United States embargo against Cuba which began in October 1960 meant that architectural projects often faced difficulties in terms of gaining resources and materials for construction, particularly in the first decade proceeding the embargo.

==== National arts schools ====
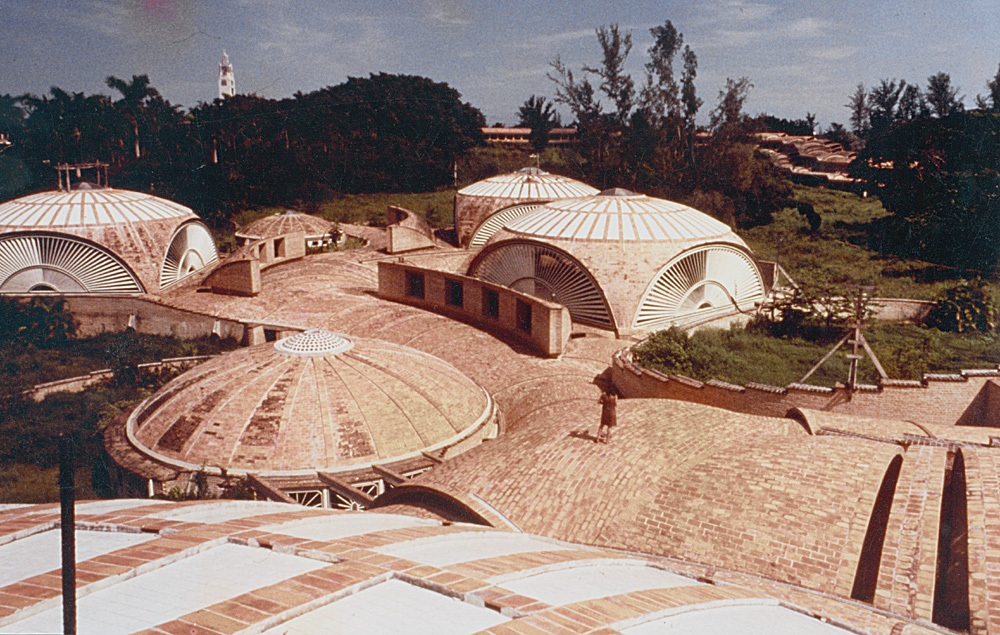
The School of Ballet, by Vittorio Garatti (1961–65), consisting of domed performance theatres created using the Catalan vault technique.

One of the largest scale architectural projects of this early post revolution period was the National Arts Schools buildings in Havana. Designed by Cuban architect Ricardo Porro, and Italian architects Roberto Gottardi and Vittorio Garatti, shortages of traditional materials due to the US trade embargo lead to the decision to use primarily local brick and terracotta tiles. The ambitious design of the Art Schools is truly a reflection of the utopian socialist and idealistic optimism present in Cuba following the revolution.

Composed of five unique buildings for each school of Art, the project commenced construction on 13 March 1961, aiming to organically intertwine natural Cuban landscapes with unique architectural techniques from around the world. One key focus was to employ the Catalan vault structure, a layered brickwork construction technique, drawing inspiration from the work of Antonin Gaudi in Spain.

However, construction of the National Art Schools never reached completion. Work stopped in 1965 for various reasons, principally due to new national preferences in favour of Soviet-style architecture and the damaging economic impact of the Cuban Missile Crisis. Despite being incomplete, the Art Schools have since received significant recognition for their innovation and beauty as an architectural form. The National Council of Cultural Heritage prescribed the Schools as national Monuments in 2011.

== 21st century ==
=== Contemporary architecture ===
While the rich history of Cuban architecture is celebrated, contemporary architecture receives less coverage in Cuba. Some academics note that modern architecture does not play an important role in Cuban culture and that architecture is not necessarily viewed in contemporary times as a desirable profession. The journal Arquitectura de Cuba was relaunched in the 1960s, however, the publication lacks funding. There remains no other modern mass media sources, including both print and television, dedicated to the architecture of Cuba at a national level. Cuban architects and historians suggest that the government decision to halt construction of the National Art Schools was the end of Cuba's architectural 'golden age.'

However, although it does not play a large role in public discourse, contemporary architecture in Cuba does still exist. One recent project is the art space Factoria Habana, which was designed by Abiel San Miguel in 2009. The building was converted from an old industrial building, and features elements characteristic of modern architecture such as high ceilings, concrete floors and an open floor plan.

Hotel buildings are also being increasingly reimagined, particularly as the Cuban government opens up to input from private sectors. The Gran Hotel Manzana in Havana is a key example of this, where renovations began in 2012 by French company Bouygues Bâtiment International on the original commercial building known as the Manzana de Gómez. Maintaining original Art Deco features, the hotel has now been redesigned to include contemporary elements and facilities, including a rooftop terrace and pool. Through such buildings, it is evident that contemporary architectural structures are beginning to integrate and coexist with historic Cuban structures and buildings.

=== Future ===
There have been several notable debates about the future direction of architecture in Cuba. Many contemporary architects argue that Cuban civil infrastructure, particularly in Havana, is outdated and therefore no longer providing for its citizens. Although a lot of architectural restoration work has been done and the city is nevertheless celebrated by tourists, Old Havana still has many buildings which are in a state of disrepair, poorly maintained or abandoned. Many of these current restoration projects are directed by the Office of the Historian of Havana.

However, such restoration projects are typically only in favour of buildings which drive tourism. On a wider scale and aside from government funded restoration, the economy of Cuba remains weak. The Gross domestic product (GDP) per capita was only US$12,300 in 2016; particularly low due to the oil crisis of Venezuela, a nation that is a crucial trading partner for Cuba. Therefore, without foreign investment, Joint ventures or the restructuring of the Cuban economy, the ability for lavish architectural projects in the future is limited.

== See also ==
- Outline of architecture
