= Pedro Pérez Sarduy =

Afro-Cuban writer (born 1943)

- Born: 1943 (age 82–83); Santa Clara, Cuba
- Education: University of Havana
- Occupations: Poet, novelist, journalist, broadcaster
- Notable work: Las criadas de La Habana (The Maids of Havana)
- Awards: Casa de las Américas Prize

Pedro Pérez Sarduy (born 1943) is an Afro-Cuban writer and broadcaster, who has published poetry and fiction, in addition to journalism. He gives lectures and reads his work at academic institutions internationally and in the early 1980s became resident in London, UK.

== Biography ==
Pedro Pérez-Sarduy was born in 1943 in Santa Clara, Cuba, where he was raised. He said in a 2016 interview: "When I was young I won a short story competition and in 1962 I went to Havana when the National School of Arts (ENA) was being created. I suddenly found myself on the 6th floor of the Havana Libre hotel training as a literary advisor so that I could show people in the countryside how they could make their story into a story." He studied English, American and French literature and language at the University of Havana. From 1965 until 1979, he was a current affairs journalist for Cuban National Radio and also worked on television on the first African and Caribbean music show in Cuba. After becoming resident in London, he worked in the Latin American department of the BBC World Service (between 1981 and 1994).

His poetry has been published in three collections – Surrealidad (1967), Cumbite (1987) and Melecón Sigloveinte (2005) – as well as appearing in The Oxford Book of Caribbean Verse (eds Stewart Brown and Mark McWatt, 2005) and other publications. He is the author of one novel, translated from Spanish as The Maids of Havana, which is based on his mother's memories of life as an Afro-Cuban from 1938 onwards, and was described by poet and critic Nancy Morejón as "a chronicle of an un-chronicled social psychology".

He also co-edited with historian Jean Stubbs Afro-Cuba: An Anthology of Cuban Writing on Race, Politics and Culture (1993).

Sarduy has read his work internationally and lectured regularly on race, politics and culture at academic institutions. He was a Ford Foundation Writer in Residence at Columbia University, New York (1989), on the CUNY Caribbean Exchange Program at Hunter College (1990), a Rockefeller Visiting Scholar at the University of Florida, Gainesville 1993), in 1997 at the University of Puerto Rico, Rio Piedras, and on the Rockefeller Fellowship Caribbean 2000 Program. He has also been a Charles McGill Fellow Visiting Lecturer at Trinity College, Hartford, Connecticut (Fall 2004), and Associate Fellow of the Caribbean Studies Centre at London Metropolitan University.

Awards he has received include (for poetry) the Casa de las Américas (1966) and Julián del Casal (Unión Nacional de Escritores y Artistas de Cuba, UNEAC) in 1967; and in 2008 the Prix du Livre Insulaire, Ouessant, for the French translation of his novel, Les bonnes de La Havane.

== Bibliography ==
=== Poetry ===
- Surrealidad, Havana: Cuadernos UNION, 1967.
- Cumbite y Otras Poemas, Havana: Ediciones Union, 1987. Bilingual edition: Cumbite and Other Poems, New York: Center for Cuban Studies, 1990.
- Melecón Sigloveinte, Havana: Editorial Letras Cubanas, 2005.

=== Novels ===
- Las criadas de La Habana (in Spanish), San Juan, Puerto Rico: Editorial Plaza Mayor, 2002, ISBN 978-1563281921; Havana: Letras Cubanas, 2003.
- Les Bonnes de La Havane (French translation of Las criadas de La Habana), Ibis Rouge, 2007, ISBN 978-2844502438
- The Maids of Havana (English translation of Las criadas de La Habana), AuthorHouse, 2010, ISBN 9781467005081

=== As co-editor ===
- With Jean Stubbs, Afro-Cuban Voices: On Race and Identity in Contemporary Cuba, University Press of Florida, 2000, ISBN 978-0813017358.
- With Jean Stubbs, Afro-Cuba: An Anthology of Cuban Writing on Race, Politics and Culture (1993), Ocean Press, 2001 (paperback), ISBN 978-1875284412.
