= Cubanacan =

2015 opera by Roberto Valera

- Opera by Roberto Valera
- Librettist: Charles Koppelman
- Language: Spanish
- Based on: Revolution of Forms by John Loomis
- Premiere: May 21, 2015; Havana, Cuba

Cubanacan is an opera in three acts with music by Roberto Valera and a libretto by Charles Koppelman based on the book Revolution of Forms (1999) by John Loomis. The opera dramatizes the struggles of Cuban architect Ricardo Porro to complete construction of the Escuelas Nacionales de Arte (National Art Schools) in Havana. Following the success of the Cuban Revolution in 1959, Fidel Castro appointed Porro to lead the design and construction of the schools. Porro, with the assistance of Italian architects Vittorio Garatti and Roberto Gottardi, designed a series of schools inspired by organic forms, in conscious rejection of the dominant International Style. Ultimately, however, the schools were unfinished and Porro was forced to leave Cuba.

The opera includes parts for the orishas Elegguá and Oshun. Orishas are deities in the Santería religion of Cuba: Elegguá is the deity of roads and also a trickster, Oshun is the orisha of sexuality, love and beauty. The orishas provide commentary on the action but also intercede at times.

Cubanacan premiered at the 12th Havana Biennial on 21 May 2015. It opened the Biennial and was performed at the Art School that was the subject of the opera in a production directed by Charles Chemin. It was the first opera premiere in Cuba since the Cuban Revolution

== Roles ==
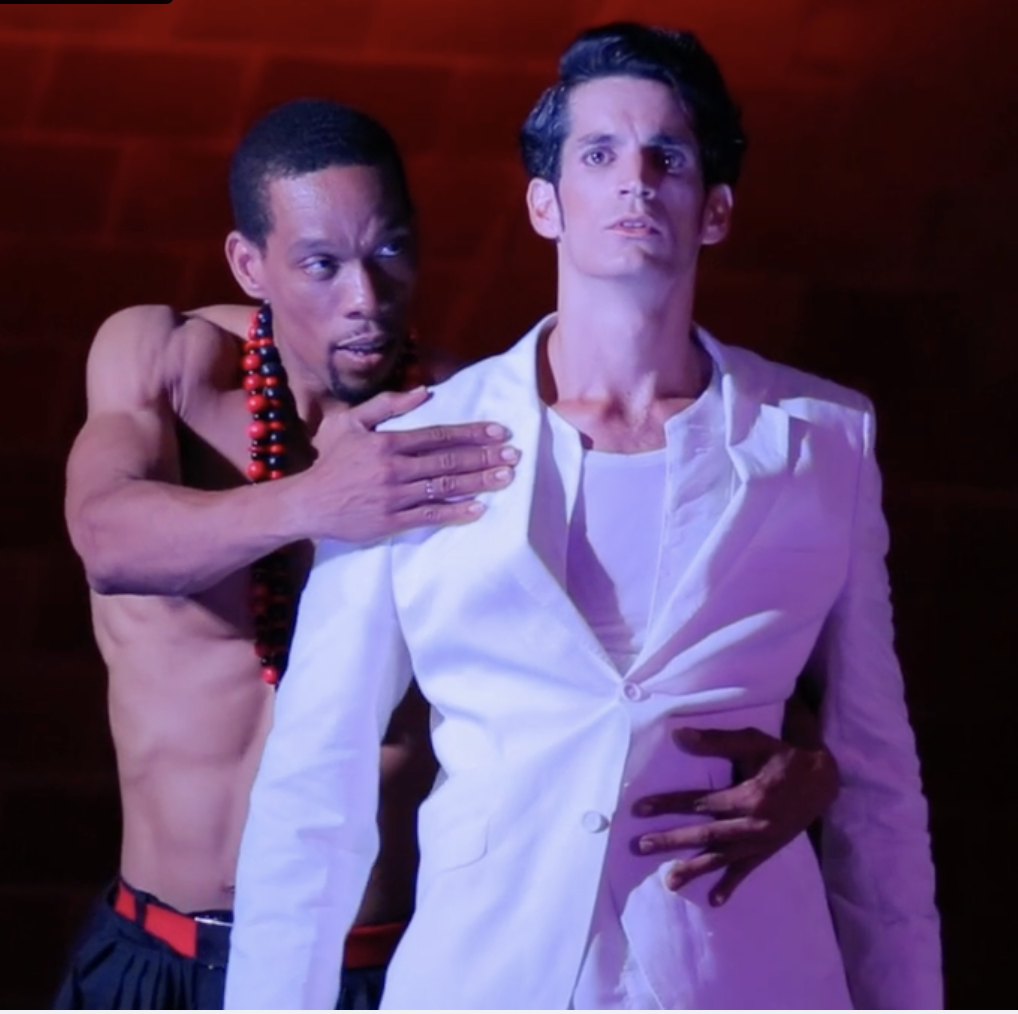
Marcos Lima as Elegguá and Brian López as Ricardo Porro in the May 21, 2015, production of Cubanacan in Havana, Cuba

Roles, voice types, premiere cast
Role	Voice type	Premiere cast, 21 May 2015 Conductor: Roberto Valera
Ricardo Porro	tenor	Bryan López
Elegguá	bass	Marcos Lima
Selma Diaz	soprano	Laura Ulloa
Oshun	soprano	Yilam Sartoria
Fidel Castro	tenor	Roger Quintana
Che Guevara	baritone	Michele Mazzara
Roberto Gottardi	tenor	Abdel Roig
Vittorio Garatti	bass	Ernesto A Leyba
Artists, intellectuals, activists, builders, townsfolk

== Synopsis ==
=== Prologue and act 1 ===
The opera begins with a prologue in which Elegguá proclaims himself and declares his authority. Act 1, scene I, begins with a scene on the Havana Country Club golf course in the Havana neighborhood of Cubanacán in which Fidel Castro and Che Guevara are playing golf in 1961 after the triumph of the Cuban Revolution. (This game is immortalized in a famous photograph by photographer Alberto Korda.) During the game, Fidel declares his intention to commission art schools to be built on the site of the golf course. Selma Diaz recommends Porro.

Scene 2 is a flashback to 1952 in which Ricardo Porro is returning to Havana from studies with Wifredo Lam in Paris. He declares his love for Cuba and his desire to design beautiful and revolutionary buildings.

Scene 3 occurs in 1958 as a rumba in the street becomes a chant supporting Castro and the revolution. Porro is one of Castro's supporters. Selma informs Porro that he is in immediate danger from the Batista regime and must leave the country. Porro departs for exile in Venezuela.

=== Act 2 ===
In scene 1, Porro is in Venezuela frustrated and longing for his homeland in Cuba. Oshun enters and informs Porro that the revolution succeeded and he should return home.

Scene 2 is a reprise of act 1, scene 1, with Selma recommending Porro as architect for the art schools.

In scene 3, Porro accepts the commission for the art schools, recognizing it as the fulfillment of his dreams. He will get assistance from two Italian architect colleagues.

=== Act 3 and epilogue ===
In scene 1, Porro and the architects Garatti and Gottardi work to design the schools. Porro is inspired by Oshun to design structures inspired by the female body and sexuality.

In scene 2, a community of artists, students, engineers and workers build the schools. Castro enters, frustrated by the challenges of governing Cuba following the revolution. Porro is frustrated by the lack of materials and support to finish the schools and asks Oshun for help. Fidel declares work on the schools must end and clashes with Porro.

Scene 3 is set in the Havana Harbor as Porro is preparing to leave Cuba. Selma bids him farewell and Elegguá is triumphant.

In the epilogue, the community assures Porro that the dream of creating beautiful art will never be lost

== Composition history ==
Charles Koppelman was introduced to the subject after viewing an exhibit about the schools by John Loomis who was a professor at San Jose State University and subsequently reading Loomis's book Revolution of Forms: Cuba's Forgotten Art Schools. According to Koppelman, "The more I read, the better the story got."

The project attracted the attention of Robert Wilson who invited Koppelman to workshop the project at The Watermill Center where he provided suggestions on staging. Meanwhile, Koppelman had enlisted Valera, one of Cuba's most celebrated composers, to write the score which mixes a romantic style with Cuban musical styles including rumba and conga.

The opera was selected by the organizers to open the 2015 Havana Biennial. The production was directed by Charles Chemin and the orchestra was conducted by Roberto Valera. According to critic Andrew Warburton, "...the opera takes the audience on a ritualistic journey from the first affirmation of a dream to the disappointment of that dream’s encounter with reality to the realization that failure need not spell the end of desire."
