= Ricardo Porro =

Cuban architect (1925 - 2014)

Ricardo Porro Hidalgo
- Born: November , 1925
- Died: December 25, 2014 (aged 89)
- Education: Universidad de la Habana
- Occupation: Architect
- Awards: Chevalier des Arts et des Lettres; Commandeur des Arts et des Lettres; Cintas Architecture Prize
- Buildings: College de Cergy-le-Haut; Banco Obrero; School of Plastic Arts; School of Modern Dance

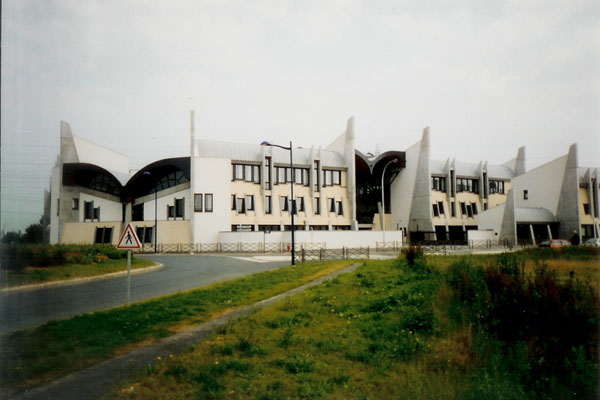
Collège de Cergy-le-Haut

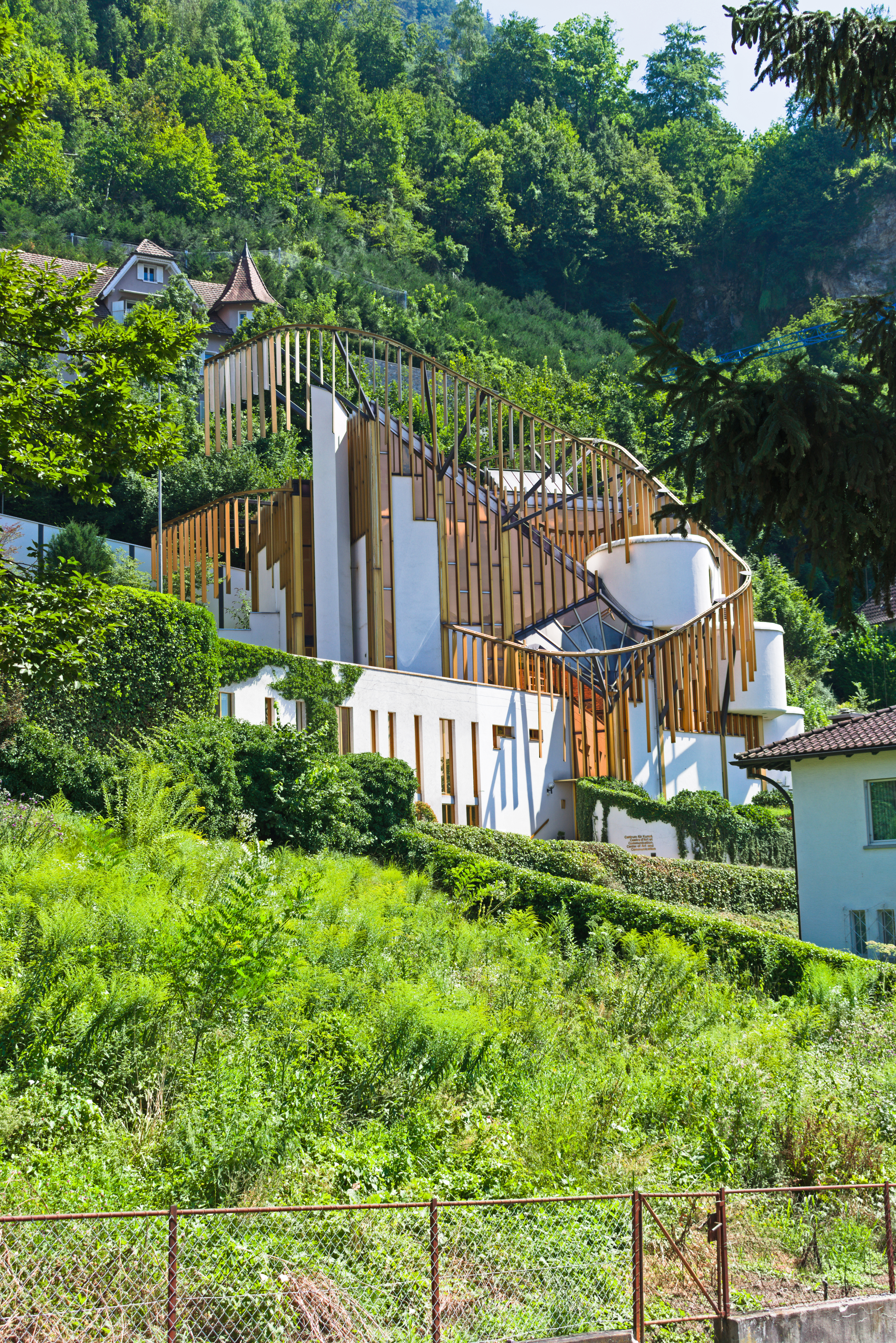
Salmann Building, Vaduz

Ricardo Porro Hidalgo (November 1925 – 25 December 2014) was a Cuban-born architect. He graduated in architecture from the Universidad de la Habana (University of Havana) in 1949 and built this year his first project Villa Armenteros in Havana, following which he spent two years in post-graduate studies at the Institute of Urbanism at the Sorbonne.

== Career ==
Back to Cuba, in 1952, he conceived and made in Havana a series of works of architecture: Villa Ennis (1953), Villa San Miguel (1953), Villa Villegas (1953), la casa Garcia (1954), the house Abbot-Villegas (1954) and Timothy Ennis (1957)his work took on distinctive Organic tendencies. These residences are part of the most important works of the modern architecture movement in Cuba, along with those of other young architects of his generation such as Frank Martínez, Nicolás Quintana, Manuel Gutierrez, Emilio del Junco, among others.

In 1957, Porro published a polemical article, El sentido de la tradición, calling for a Cuban architecture that recognized the specificities of culture and history - “una arquitectura negra”. Shortly thereafter, Porro’s support for the Cuban Revolution caught up with him, and he was forced into exile when his subversive activities were discovered following the failed General Strike of 1957. That year Ricardo Porro moved to Caracas, where he was recruited as a professor of urban planning and architecture in the newly opened (1954) Faculty of Architecture and Urbanism of the Central University of Venezuela. He taught there along with the important Venezuelan architect and theorist Carlos Raúl Villanueva, as well as Wifredo Lam, who made in 1957, one of the murals of the University campus.

He worked in the Banco Obrero project led by the architect Carlos Raúl Villanueva. While in Venezuela, Porro met two Italian expatriate architects: Roberto Gottardi and Vittorio Garatti. Following the victory of the Cuban Revolution, Porro returned to Cuba and in 1960 was designated by Fidel Castro as the head of design for Havana's new National Art Schools. Porro invited Gottardi and Garatti to join him in the project, for which he designed the School of Modern Dance and the School of Plastic Arts.

In 1966, Porro fled in exile to France following a political realignment in Cuba, a shift which deemed the architecture and architects of Cuba's National Art Schools to be a politically incorrect counter to the Soviet Functionalist building style that was rapidly gaining dominance in the country. Once in Europe, Porro taught classes in Paris, Lille and Strasbourg on the history of art and architecture.

Since 1966, Ricardo Porro participated in important architectural competitions such as the Paláis de l'air et de l'espace (Paris), and the urban planning of the University of Villetaneuse, in collaboration with the Polish architect André Mrowiec. His first work of architecture built in Europe was in 1969, when, at the request of Robert Altman, an important philanthropist and art collector, he conceived the L'Or du Rhin center in Vaduz, Liechtenstein.

Following this first work and in parallel to his work as a sculptor and painter, Porro began to work and achieve numerous projects of architecture and urbanism: The Youth House, in Vaduz, as well as a Holiday Village on the Island of Vela Luka, Yugoslavia, and the Esfahan villa, in Iran, 1975.

He also collaborated on extensive architectural works in France from the 1986s through the first decade of the 21st century associated with the French architect Renaud de la Noue, particularly educational institutions in Île-De-France.

His architectural models, made between 1961 and 1980, can be visited at the Museum Les Turbulences FRAC Centre (Fonds Régionaux d'Art Contemporain) of the city of Orleans, France.

Ricardo Porro was a member of the French Order of Architects and the Republic of France awarded him, for all his work as an architect, artist and urban planner, the titles of Chevalier des Arts et des Lettres, Chevalier of the Légion d'Honneur and Commandeur des Arts et des Lettres.

In 1991, the French Institute of Architecture organized the important exhibition 'Gros Plan 1: Ricardo Porro. Focus on his works, and architecture projects'.

In 1994 he was nominated for the most prestigious international annual award for architecture, the Pritzker Prize, considered the Nobel of architecture and awarded by an international jury through the Hyatt Foundation.

In 2008, the Cintas Foundation, based in the city of Miami, awarded him the Cintas Architecture prize as a recognition of his long career as an intellectual and architect.

The opera Cubanacan with music by Roberto Valero and libretto by Charles Koppelman was based on Porro's struggles to complete Cuba's National Art Schools. Cubanacan was performed at the National Art Schools on the opening nights of the 2015 Havana Bienalle. In 2012, the president of the Italian Republic awarded Porro the Vittorio De Sica prize for Architecture, for the project of the School of Art, Havana, along with Vittorio Garatti and Roberto Gottardi.

In 2011, Ricardo Porro appeared in the multiple award-winning documentary film Unfinished Spaces directed by Alysa Nahmias and Benjamin Murray, which follows him and architects Vittorio Garatti and Roberto Gottardi on their journey to design, build, and restore the National Art Schools buildings in Cuba. He attended the film premieres in Los Angeles and New York.

Currently 2014, he had finished painting a new series of paintings in large format, on a proposal for presentation by Michael Connors to exhibit at the MOLAA (Museum of Latin American Art) in Los Angeles USA, whose working title of the exhibition I proposed "Myths, Symbols and Visions."

The MOMA (Museum of Modern Art) in New York included original drawings of his projects The Schools of Art and Dance in Havana in its exhibition "Latin America in Construction: architecture 1955-1980" from March 29 to July 19, 2015 among other important Latin American architects.

On 25 December 2014, Porro died at the age of 89 in Paris.

== Bibliography ==
- Loomis, John A., Revolution of Forms - Cuba's Forgotten Art Schools (Princeton Architectural Press, New York, 1999 & 2011, ISBN 978-1-56898-988-4)
- María Elena Martín and Eduardo Luis Rodríguez: Havana, Cuba: An Architectural Guide (Junta de Andalucía, Sevilla, 1998, ISBN 84-8095-143-5)
- Eduardo Luis Rodríguez: The Havana Guide, Modern Architecture, 1925-1965 (Princeton Architectural Press, New York, 2000, ISBN 1-56898-210-0)
- Alysa Nahmias and Benjamin Murray, Unfinished Spaces (Ajna Films, 2011)
- Charles Arthur Boyer, Dictionnaire de l'Architecture du XXe siècle, sous la direction de Jean-Paul Midant, 1996, p. 718
- Architecture & Urbanisme n°282, œuvres complètes, mars 1994
- Ricardo Porro, Œuvres 1950-1993, 1993.
- Gros Plan 1 : Ricardo Porro, catalogue d'exposition à l'Institut français d'architecture, Pandora éditions, 1991, textes de François Barré et Isabelle Cazès
- Ricardo Porro et Renaud de la Noue architectes, collège Elsa Triolet à Saint-Denis, photographies de Anne Favret & Patrick Manez, Les éditions du demi-cercle, 1990
