= Evelyn O'Callaghan =

Jamaican historian (born 1950)

- Born: 20 September 1954 (age 72); Nigeria
- Citizenship: Jamaican

Academic background
- Education: University College Cork; Wolfson College, Oxford (MLitt); University of the West Indies (PhD)
- Doctoral advisor: Edward Baugh

Academic work
- Discipline: Historian
- Sub-discipline: West Indian literature
- Institutions: University of the West Indies

Evelyn O'Callaghan (born 20 September 1954) is a Jamaican academic who is a professor of West Indian literature at the University of the West Indies. She was the first Jamaican woman to win a Rhodes Scholarship.

== Biography ==
O'Callaghan was born in Nigeria to parents of Irish descent. She moved to Jamaica as a small child, and attended Mount Alvernia High School in Montego Bay. O'Callaghan completed her undergraduate education at Ireland's University College Cork, which her father had attended. She was Jamaica's Rhodes Scholar for 1978, the first woman to be selected for the honour, and subsequently completed a Master of Letters degree at Wolfson College, Oxford. She later completed a doctorate at the University of the West Indies (UWI), with her thesis being supervised by Edward Baugh. O'Callaghan initially worked as a junior lecturer in English literature at the UWI campus in Mona, Jamaica. She transferred to the Cave Hill, Barbados, campus in 1983, and was eventually awarded a full professorship. O'Callaghan is the current dean of the Faculty of Humanities and Education, and has previously served as head of the Department of Language, Linguistics and Literature. She is an editor of the Journal of West Indian Literature, and has written several books about early West Indian women writers.
