= Journal of West Indian Literature =

Caribbean periodical (founded 1986)

The Journal of West Indian Literature (JWIL) was founded in 1986 by Guyanese scholar and writer Mark McWatt, and in its first decades was led by McWatt, as JWIL's inaugural editor, assisted by Jamaican scholar Victor Chang, who eventually succeeded McWatt in the role of editor, and in turn was succeeded by Evelyn O'Callaghan. The current chief co-editors are Michael A. Bucknor and Lisa Outar.

JWIL is published twice-yearly by the Departments of Literatures in English of The University of the West Indies campuses. Since 2015, JWIL has been available online. It has been described as a "Caribbeanist project invested in highlighting and critically examining the prolific literary production of the Anglophone Caribbean."

Regarded as a pioneering publication and "the foremost periodical dedicated to Anglophone Caribbean literary scholarship", JWIL was the 2025 recipient of the Bocas Henry Swanzy Award for Distinguished Service to Caribbean Letters, the first time a collective rather than an individual had been honoured with the prize.
