= Unfinished Spaces =

- Unfinished Spaces Logo
- Directed by: Alysa Nahmias and Benjamin Murray
- Produced by: Alysa Nahmias and Benjamin Murray
- Starring: Ricardo Porro, Vittorio Garatti, Roberto Gottardi
- Cinematography: Benjamin Murray
- Edited by: Kristen Nutile, Alex Minnick
- Music by: Giancarlo Vulcano
- Production company: Ajna Films
- Release date: June 19, 2011
- Running time: 86 minutes
- Country: United States
- Languages: English; Spanish

Unfinished Spaces is a 2011 documentary film about the revolutionary design of the National Art Schools (Cuba), directed by Alysa Nahmias and Benjamin Murray. The film tells the dramatic story of the art schools from their founding by Fidel Castro and Che Guevara to their eventual abandonment and fall into ruin and recent efforts to restore them.

The three visionary architects Ricardo Porro, Roberto Gottardi, and Vittorio Garatti are interviewed on camera. They talk about the intense atmosphere of revolutionary Cuba and how they strove to create an entirely new language of architecture, one without precedent. They also speak about why their design fell into disfavor and how the complex was mostly abandoned, uncompleted.

As the film shows, parts of the schools are in ruins while other parts are used today by young dancers and artists. These schools are on the watch list of the World Monuments Fund, and efforts to restore the abandoned buildings are being explored.

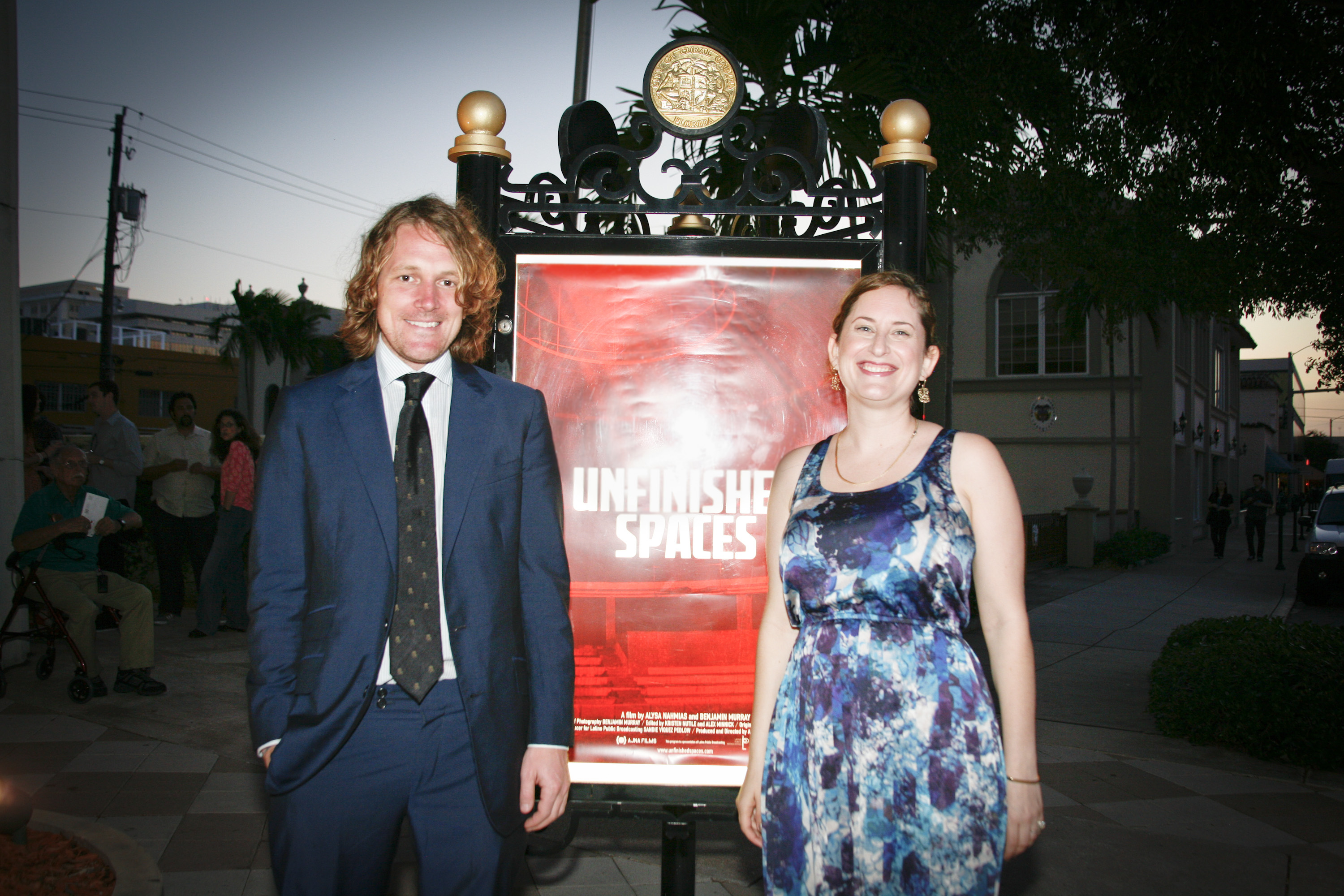
Directors Alysa Nahmias & Benjamin Murray at the 2012 Miami international Film Festival presentation for the film

Unfinished Spaces was produced by Alysa Nahmias and Benjamin Murray, filmmakers who became obsessed with the story of the schools' rise and downfall. The film received several important grants and had its World Premiere at the Los Angeles Film Festival in June 2011. The film was favorably reviewed in The Hollywood Reporter and LA Weekly. It went on to have its Cuban premiere at Havana's 2011 Festival Internacional de Nuevo Cine Latinoamericano and win an award at the Miami International Film Festival in 2012. It was broadcast on PBS in the United States, HBO Latin America, and the "Witness" series on Al-Jazeera English.

The film was the recipient of the 2014 Society of Architectural Historians Film and Video Award and winner of a 2012 Film Independent Spirit Award. Unfinished Spaces also won the 2014 Society of Architecture Historians Award for Film and Video.

Unfinished Spaces is in the permanent collection of the Museum of Modern Art in New York City.
