= Mark McWatt =

Guyanese writer and academic (born 1947)

- Born: 29 September 1947 (age 79); Guyana
- Education: University of Toronto (1966–70)
- Alma mater: Leeds University
- Occupations: Writer and academic
- Notable work: The Language of Eldorado (1994); Suspended Sentences (2005)
- Awards: Commonwealth Writers' Prize; Casa de las Américas Prize

Mark McWatt (born 29 September 1947) is a Guyanese writer and former professor of English at University of the West Indies.

== Biography ==
McWatt was born in 1947 in Guyana, attending many schools throughout the country due to his father's position as a district officer. McWatt attended the University of Toronto (1966–70) and Leeds University, where he studied the works of Wilson Harris and completed a Ph.D. in 1975. He took a position at the University of the West Indies, Cave Hill campus, Barbados, as an assistant lecturer, then moved up to Professor of West Indian Literature in 1999, until retiring in 2007 as Professor Emeritus.

He was founding editor, in 1986, of the Journal of West Indian Literature and published three collections of poetry, the second of which, The Language of Eldorado (1994), was awarded the Guyana Prize. His 2005 first work of fiction, Suspended Sentences, was the winner of a Commonwealth Writers' Prize in 2006, as well as the Casa de las Américas Prize for best book of Caribbean Literature in English or Creole. A review of Suspended Sentences in the Journal of West Indian Literature called it "haunting, magical and profane".

He co-edited with Stewart Brown the literature compilations Oxford Book of Caribbean Verse and The Caribbean Short Story: Critical Perspectives.

McWatt has said his poetry was inspired first by the Guyana landscape, and how it can "at once alter and respond to interior states". His poems reflect his views of the natural world and the supernatural, including a vampire of Caribbean folklore ("Ol' Higue"), and of marriage and domesticity ("A Man in the House").

== Bibliography ==
=== Poetry ===
- Interiors – Dangaroo Press, 1989
- The Language of Eldorado – Dangaroo Press, 1994 (ISBN 978-1-84523-402-7)
- The Journey to Le Repentir – Peepal Tree Press, 2009 (ISBN 978-1-84523-081-4)

=== Fiction ===
- Suspended Sentences: Fictions of Atonement – Peepal Tree Press, 2005 (ISBN 978-1-84523-001-2)

=== As editor ===
- The Oxford Book of Caribbean Verse – edited with Stewart Brown, 2005
- The Caribbean Short Story: Critical Perspectives – edited with Lucy Evans, and Emma Smith; Peepal Tree Press, 2011 (ISBN 978-1-84523-126-2)
