= Hotel Inglaterra =

Historic hotel in Havana, Cuba

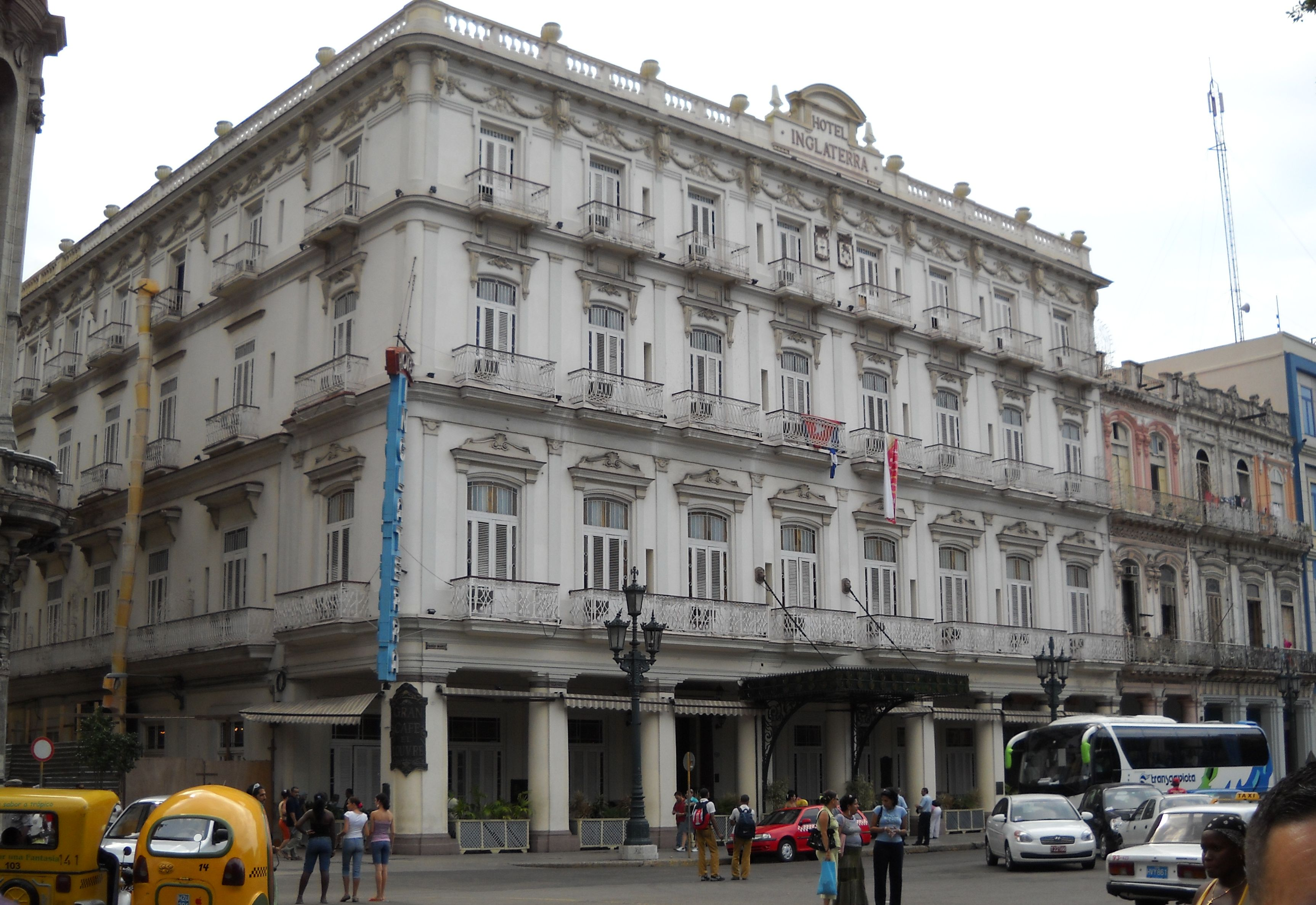

General information
- Location: Paseo del Prado #416 entre San Rafael and San Miguel; Havana, Cuba
- Coordinates: 23.1374°N 82.3595°W
- Opening: December 23, 1875
- Owner: Gran Caribe

Technical details
- Floor count: 4

Other information
- Number of rooms: 83
- Number of restaurants: 2

Hotel Inglaterra is the oldest hotel in Havana. It is located at Paseo del Prado #416 between San Rafael and San Miguel.

== History ==
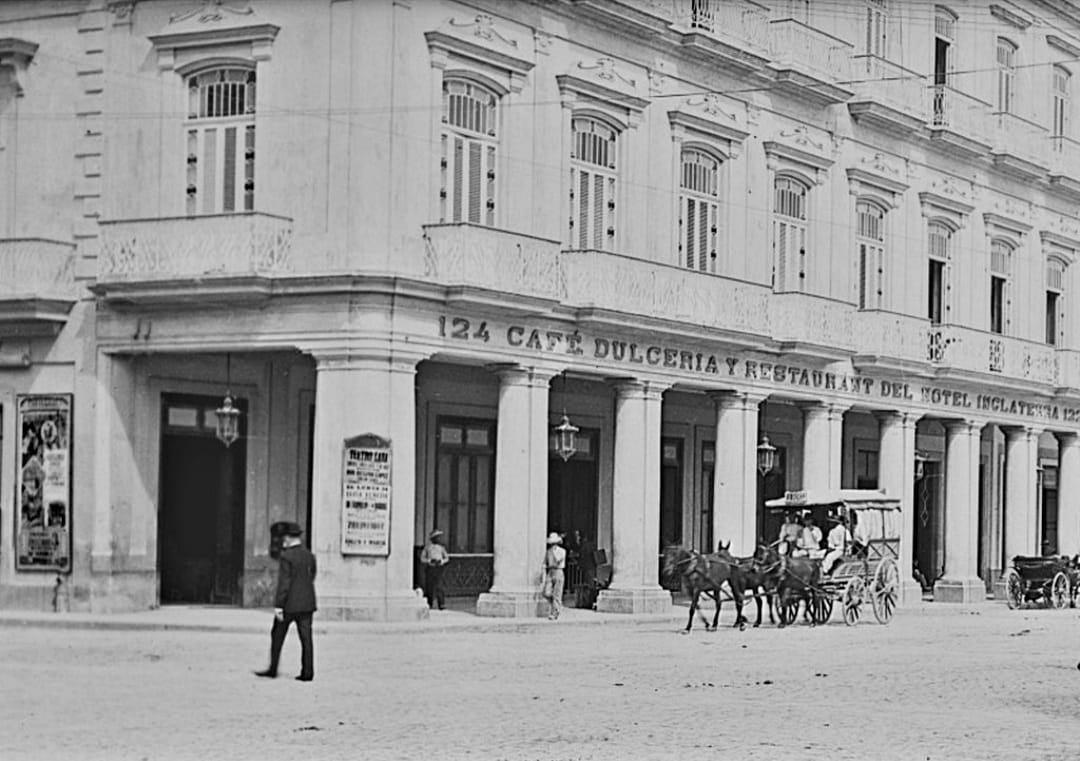
Hotel Inglaterra, corner ground floor, Havana, Cuba.

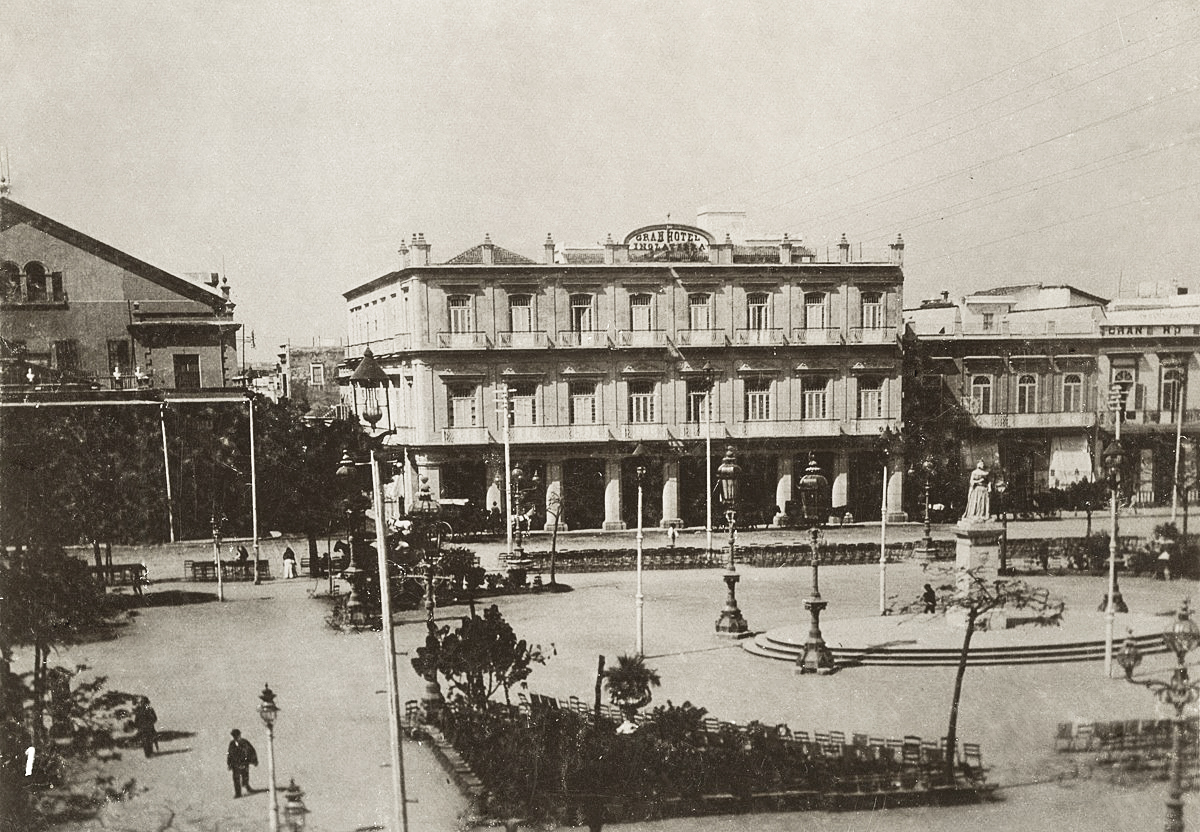
The Plaza or Central Park, Havana, showing Hotel Inglaterra and Tacón theater in the background; and the white marble statue of ex-Queen Isabella II in the center of the plaza. Albumen photograph, [1898].

The hotel traces its origins to 1844, when a two-story building known as El Cafe or The Escauriza Saloon was built at the site. In 1863, El Cafe was sold to Joaquin Payret, who renamed it El Louvre. In 1875, Payret sold the cafe to finance construction of a theater across the street, and the Gran Hotel de Inglaterra was constructed, opening on December 23, 1875. The two-story structure was owned by Manuel López and Urban González and was designed in the neoclassical style. In 1886, the hotel was sold to Don Francisco Villamil, who added a third floor to the building.

General Antonio Maceo stayed at the hotel for six months in 1890. Winston Churchill stayed there while visiting Cuba as a military reporter during the Spanish-Cuban war in December 1895.

The Inglaterra was renovated again in 1901, with the addition of electricity, telephones, private bathrooms in each room, and a telegraph link. The fourth floor was added in 1914, along with the iconic glass marquee. In 1931, the hotel was forced to close, due to the impact of the Great Depression. It reopened in 1939. In the 1930s, the hotel was owned and operated by the Solés family. The general manager was Candido Solés. It was remodeled multiple times after the Revolution, in 1973, 1981 and 1989.

On March 19, 2016, Starwood announced that the Inglaterra would become the first hotel in Cuba to be managed by an American company in over 55 years, joining The Luxury Collection division. Starwood received special authorization from the U.S. Treasury to operate the hotel. Necessary renovations delayed the Inglaterra joining Starwood, and the Four Points by Sheraton Havana, a conversion of the existing Hotel Quinta Avenida, ended up being the first US-managed hotel, in June 2016. Marriott International acquired Starwood on September 23, 2016. Dates for the Inglaterra to join The Luxury Collection were later announced, including December 2016, December 2017, December 2019, and 2020, but they all passed with the hotel never being renovated and never joining Marriott. On June 5, 2020, Marriott was ordered by the U.S. Treasury to cease management of the Four Points by Sheraton by August 31 and not to open any other planned properties in Cuba, like the Inglaterra.

== Appearances in books and movies ==
Hotel Inglaterra appears in the Elmore Leonard novel Cuba Libre. It also appears in the Cristina García (journalist) novel Dreaming in Cuban.

== See also ==
- List of buildings in Havana
