= Stewart Brown =

British poet and academic (born 1951)

- Born: 1951 (age 74–75); Southampton, England
- Education: Nottingham College of Education; Falmouth School of Art
- Alma mater: University of Sussex; University of Wales
- Occupations: Poet, lecturer and scholar of African and Caribbean literature

Stewart Brown (born 1951 in Southampton, UK) is an English poet, university lecturer and scholar of African and Caribbean Literature.

== Life and study ==
Brown is an English-born lecturer in Caribbean and African culture, particularly Literature, at the Centre of West African Studies, University of Birmingham, since 1988, and has also spent periods teaching in schools and universities in Jamaica, Nigeria, Wales and Barbados.

He studied at Nottingham College of Education (a forerunner of Nottingham Trent University) from 1969 to 1972, Falmouth School of Art (now Falmouth University) from 1975 to 1978, the University of Sussex (1978–79), and the University of Wales, Aberystwyth (now Aberystwyth University) from 1982 to 1987.

One of the foremost scholars of West Indian literature in the UK, Brown has edited several seminal works on the subject. He has taught at Bayero University, Nigeria, and at the Jamaica and Barbados campuses of the University of the West Indies.

As an artist, he had several solo shows of paintings in Jamaica and the UK during the 1970s, and more recently his work has been exhibited in Birmingham, in Barbados, in Dar es Salaam, Tanzania and in Guyana. Also a poet, Brown received a Gregory Award in 1976 and has subsequently published four collections of poems, including Mekin Foolishness (1981), Zinder (1986) and Lugard's Bridge (1989).

== Selected publications ==
- (Ed.) Caribbean Poetry Now (Edward Arnold, 1984; revised 2nd edition 1992, ISBN 978-0340573792).
- (Ed.) The Art of Kamau Brathwaite (Seren, 1995, ISBN 9781854110923).
- (Ed. with Mervyn Morris, Gordon Rohlehr), Voiceprint: An Anthology of Oral and Related Poetry from the Caribbean (1989).
- (Ed. with Ian McDonald), The Heinemann Book of Caribbean Poetry (1992).
- Elsewhere: New and Selected Poems (Leeds: Peepal Tree Press, 1999).
- (Ed.) Kiss and Quarrel: Yoruba/English Strategies of Mediation (Birmingham: Birmingham University Centre of African Studies Series 5, 2000, ISBN 978-0704422834).
- All Are Involved: The Art of Martin Carter (Leeds: Peepal Tree Press, 2000).
- (Ed. with Mark McWatt) The Oxford Book of Caribbean Verse (Oxford: Oxford University Press, 2005)
- Tourist, Traveller, Troublemaker: Essays on Poetry (Leeds: Peepal Tree Press, 2007).
- (Ed. with Ian McDonald) The Bowling was Superfine: West Indian Writing and West Indian Cricket (Leeds: Peepal Tree Press, paperback 2012, ISBN 978-1845230548).
