= Felipe Dulzaides =

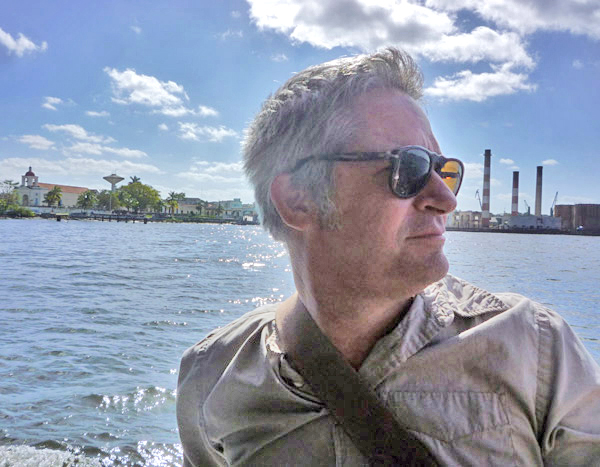
- Born: February 23, 1965 (age 60); Havana, Cuba
- Known for: Contemporary art
- Movement: Conceptual art, Land art, Neo realism, Arte povera, Performance art, Jazz
- Awards: Rome Prize, Cintas Fellowship

Felipe Dulzaides (born February 23, 1965) is a Cuban-born American contemporary artist. His practice includes installation, photography, video, drawing, sculpture and performance. Two important cities of reference of his works are San Francisco, California and Havana, Cuba.

== Family and education ==
Felipe Dulzaides was born in Havana during the early period of the Cuban revolution, a time characterized by collective hope and enthusiasm. He is the son of an influential musician (they share the same name) and a kindergarten teacher. His father played an important role in the development of jazz in Cuba. His family also includes the Origenes group poets Eliseo Diego, Fina Garcia-Marruz and Cintio Vitier.

In the mid 1980s Dulzaides attended the dramatic arts program of the Instituto Superior de Arte (ISA). As a student he became interested in the concepts of Jerzy Grotowski expressed on his book Towards a Poor Theater. Furthermore, he focused his studies in experimental theater, questioning issues of stereotype in theater representation. After completing his studies, he joined the group Buendia directed by Flora Lawten. While touring in Italy he quit dramatic arts and decided to not return to Havana.

After spending months in Italy and Spain, he moved to Miami. In 1993 he enrolled in documentary photography classes at Miami Dade Community College. In 1998 Dulzaides moved to California to work on his MFA at the San Francisco Art Institute. In San Francisco his work shifted from documentary street photography to conceptual photography, and he became interested in exploring how art relates to life. Bay Area conceptualists: Paul Kos, Tony Labat, and David Ireland particularly inspired him. From 2005 to 2009 he taught installation, conceptual photography, and video courses at the New Genres Department of the San Francisco Art Institute.

== Work and themes ==
Improvisation plays an important role In Dulzaides’ practice. “Lucky accidents,” economy of means, and a poetic use of documentation, materials, found objects, metaphors and issues of representation are recurring aspects present in his art.

=== Incite and document a poetic occurrence ===
According to the curator Rene de Guzaman, Dulzaides’ “videos depict simple acts recorded throughout time. The artist often appears as a central element in his work, but also employs rudimentary objects, which are used to create performative actions. These acts have a repetitive or singular quality designed to create a flow that sweeps the viewer toward some unforeseen artistic destination. As we watch his work unfold, what may appear to be an elementary act loses its simplicity and takes on breadth, complexity and associations that the viewer brings to the artistic experience.”

In Following an orange (1999), the video that marks the beginning of his oeuvre, Dulzaides sets an orange in motion rolling down the street. At the end of the one-minute orange's arduous ride, it manages to safely cross a busy avenue through the passing cars.

On the ball (2000), is one of the most exhibited videos. It explores a psychological state caused by cultural displacement. Video and media curator Rudolf Frieling stated: “Unedited and staged without digital processing, On the Ball presents the visibility of the face as a function of breathing. At the same time, breathing heavily on the camera’s lens plays on the function of the videotape, its reference to time. In this instance, allowing something to become visible also proves itself to be a dialectic process of obscuring and making clear”

Tony Labat, a mentor at the San Francisco Art Institute, wrote about his video work stating: “Mixing and manipulating performance, sound, sculpture and the theatre of the body, Felipe Dulzaides creates hybrid and personal compositions...like songs...riffs...improvisations...poetry in motion.”

=== The city and the individual ===
Dulzaides’ work also explores the correlation between an individual and its context: the city. In San Francisco he used as his first studio a rooftop with an extraordinary view in the North Beach neighborhood. He titled it: “a studio without walls.” The two-channel video installation Dialogue with a Foghorn 1999-2002 presents on one channel, Dulzaides moving in circles riding a bicycle at dusk on a roof (a space without exit), while a separate video channel features him responding to a foghorn. Every time he responds to the foghorn with a whistle, he also illuminates his face with a flashlight thus establishing a visual contact with the viewer.

Havana is a city rich with a wide range of urban conditions. Dulzaides uses these as settings for a series of performed actions and straightforward documentation pieces based in observations. Eighteen reasons to cease making art (2007-2011) is a photo series that documents a variety of incidents in urban space that reference contemporary sculpture and installation art.

=== Public art ===
Dulzaides’ interest in tackling the city and public spaces compelled him to orchestrate several interventions and public art projects in different contexts. Double take (2004-2005) consisted of a series of eight site-specific billboards featuring a recognizable detail of the site. Each unannounced billboard appeared in the San Francisco downtown area. The essential is invisible (2005) consisted in the fabrication of an inflatable organ referencing the heart measuring 25 ft. long by 15 wide by 11 ft. high. Viewers can enter the piece through the aorta. Inside they encounter a translucent red space which jumps and move through the organ's chambers. When viewers are inside, the piece moves, the organism is alive. Viewers exit through another artery. Its title references the well-known phrase from the book The Little Prince. It is only with the heart that one can see rightly; what is essential is invisible to the eye.”

A matter of perspective (2019), sited on Havana's Malecón consisted of an installation of panels that fragmented the perception of the ocean and the city view. These panels, (usually used on construction sites) reference and question the recent spread of hotel construction in Havana's skyline.

=== Architecture ===
Other process-oriented projects are account-based; a research method based on filtering the explored contents. In 2004 Dulzaides became engaged with modernist architecture for the trilogy of mixed media installations: Utopia posible (1999-ongoing). This body of work explores and exposes different aspects of the architecture of the unfinished National Art Schools of Cuba. The entire project departs from the very first installation, a simple gesture of cleaning a water channel so that the Next time it rains the water will run. As Utopia posible developed, so did meaningful friendships with the architects that designed these emblematic and controversial buildings: Roberto Gottardi, Vittorio Garatti, and Ricardo Porro. The gesture of cleaning grew into a research based mixed media document that captures and reflects philosophies of its authors as well as their struggle to conclude and defend their work. Recently Dulzaides has joined forces with a team of professionals in building conservation to find ways to conclude and preserve these architectural masterpieces.

=== Circle ===
The circle is a recurrent theme in his art due to his autobiographical experience of reentering meaningful scenarios throughout his life. A class trip to Havana in 1999 as a student of the San Francisco Art Institute and an artist's exchange program set him on that direction. For Dulzaides, the nature of the relationship an artist has with context shapes the tone of his work. That is why after completing the project Full Circle (2010–11) at the American Academy in Rome, he decided to base his studio in Havana. Full Circle, is a body of work developed which traces his experience of twenty years earlier in Italy when he abandoned the theater and decided to not return to Havana.

=== Crossover ===
Dulzaides, has exhibited and developed many projects in Cuba. Flag my height (2007) is a neon piece featuring a Cuban flag measuring his tallness. Dulzaides believes that part of the role of an artist is also to articulate a critical perspective. His pieces reflect a balancing and bridging view. A billboard piece titled: All that we have been missing (2008) located in the highway Interstate 40 of Indiana, a state without a warm ocean and tropical beaches, featured two photographs back to back. One side showed the trace of a path in a blue sky. The second image featured a beautiful and warm sandy beach. The two snapshots were taken at a Varadero beach resort, where he spent the first ten years of his childhood. Works like this reinforce recent political ideas about dialogue and negotiation as a solution to the US-Cuba political conflict.

The project Felipe Dulzaides plays Felipe Dulzaides (2009-2017) looks into the life and work of his father from an inner perspective. His father was a musician and a mentor that played a key role developing jazz during the early years of the Cuban revolution. In that period the cultural authorities misjudged jazz. His latest project Centro Bahia (2014-ongoing) is at his studio, a restored space located in Regla, an area located across the bay from Havana. At his studio he is developing a flexible program that can accommodate residencies, exhibitions, lectures and events. Centro Bahia is a hub for developing experimental crossovers between art, ecological, urban, and community issues. Besides serving as his studio, it is a space dedicated to stimulate creative thinking.

== Exhibitions ==
His work has been internationally exhibited in biennials, arts centers, non-profit experimental art spaces and public spaces.

- X, XII, XIII Havana biennial
- 7th Gwangju biennale
- 2008 California biennial

Solo exhibitions: Graham Foundation, Richard. E. Peeler Art Center, Freedom Tower, Sala Diaz, New Langton Arts, The Lab, and Galeria Habana

Thematic exhibitions: Bay Area Now at the Yerba Buena Center for the Arts, Kunts X Kuba at the Ludwig Forum, Condemned to be Modern at LAGMAG, and Itineraries Fundación Botin among many others.

== Awards, grants and residencies ==
- 2001–2002, Cintas Fellowship
- 2003, Headlands Center for the Arts
- 2010–2011, Rome Prize, American Academy in Rome
- Fundación Botin
- Graham Foundation
- Copenhague Artist in Residence
- Creative Work Fund
- Art Matters
- Visions from the New California
- Artadia
- Bay Area Award
