= National Art Schools (Cuba) =

Buildings in Havana, Cuba

Coordinates: 23°05′17″N 82°26′53″W

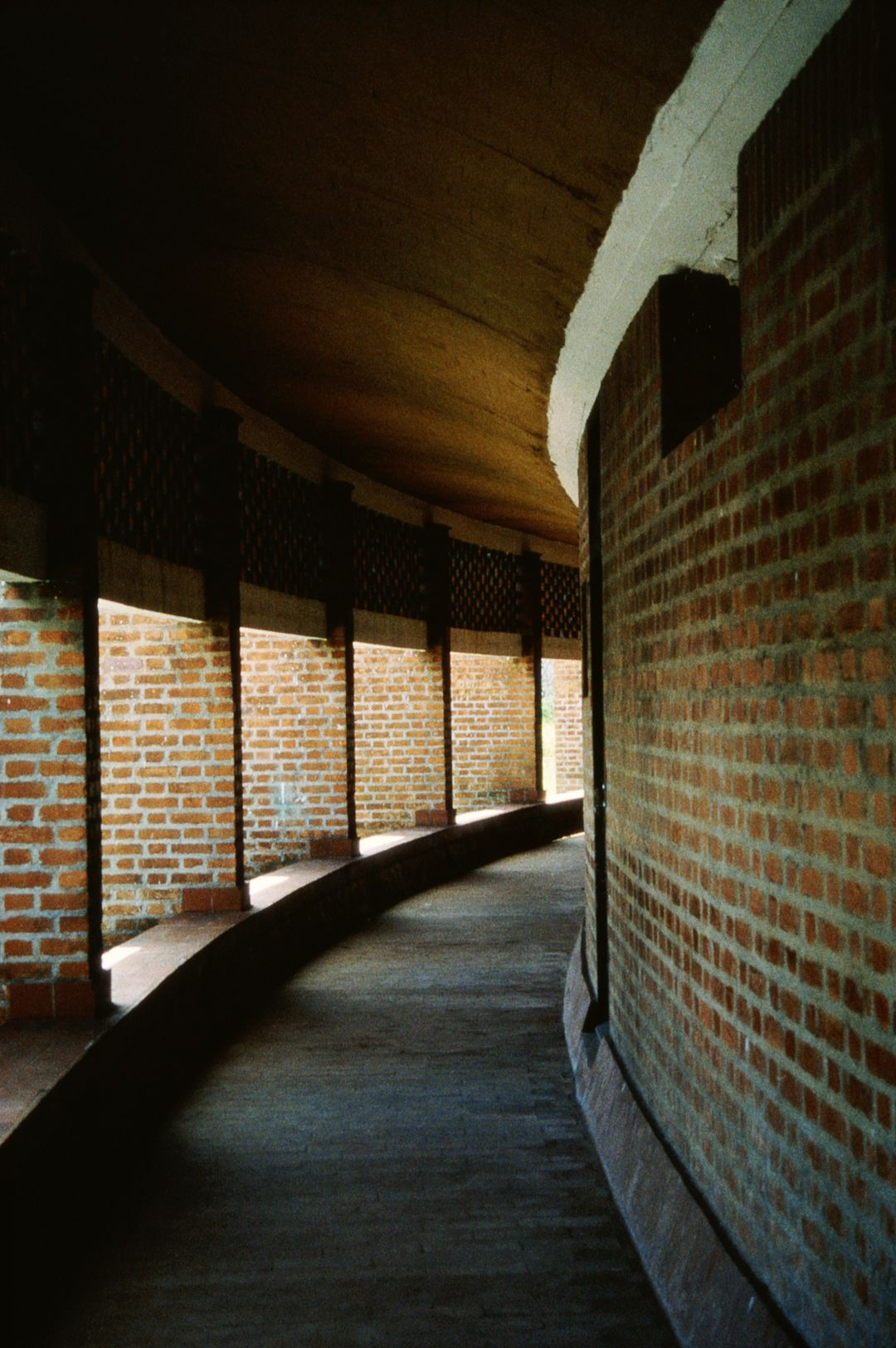
School of Music, Vittorio Garatti

The National Art Schools (Escuelas Nacionales de Arte) of Cuba is one of the most important educational institutions of the Cuban nation and has been declared as "National Monument".

Cuba's National Art Schools (Escuelas Nacionales de Arte, now known as the Instituto Superior de Arte) are considered by historians to be among the most outstanding architectural achievements of the Cuban Revolution.

These innovative, organic Catalan-vaulted brick and terra-cotta structures were built on the site of a former country club in the far western Havana suburb of Cubanacán, which was once considered to be Havana's "Beverly Hills", The schools were conceived and founded by Fidel Castro and Che Guevara in 1961, and they reflect the utopian optimism and revolutionary exuberance of the early years of the Cuban Revolution. Over their years of active use, the schools served as the primary incubator for Cuba's artists, musicians, actors and dancers.

World Monuments Fund video on conservation of the National Schools of Art

By 1965, however, the art schools and their architects fell out of favor as Soviet-inspired functionalist forms became standard in Cuba. Additionally, the schools were subjected to accusations that their design was incompatible with the Cuban Revolution. These factors resulted in the schools’ near-complete decommissioning and the departure of two of their three architects. Never fully completed, the complex of buildings lay in various stages of use and abandonment, some parts literally overgrown by the jungle until preservation efforts began in the first decade of the 21st century. The schools’ legacy was eventually brought to light by regional and international architectural journals in the 1980s, piquing the curiosity of observers both internationally and within Cuba through the 1990s. This growing interest reached its apex in 1999 with the publication of the book Revolution of Forms - Cuba's Forgotten Art Schools, by John Loomis, a California-based architect, professor, and author. Following the publication of Revolution of Forms, the schools attracted even greater international attention and in 2000 they were nominated for the World Monuments Fund Watch List. In November 2010, the National Art Schools were officially recognized as national monuments by the Cuban Government, and they are currently being considered for inclusion on the World Heritage list of sites which have "outstanding universal value" to the world.

Cuba's National Art Schools have inspired a series of art installations under the name of Utopia Posible by the Cuban artist Felipe Dulzaides, the documentary film Unfinished Spaces by Alysa Nahmias and Ben Murray, and an opera directed by Robert Wilson entitled Revolution of Forms (named after John Loomis' book) written by Charles Koppleman.

== Conceptualization ==
In January 1961, the Cuban revolutionary leaders Fidel Castro and Che Guevara, enjoyed a drink after they finished a game of golf at Havana's formerly exclusive Country Club Park, pondered the future of a country club whose members had all fled the country. The Cuban Literacy Campaign had just been launched, and with the inspiration of extending the program's success into a wider cultural arena, Guevara proposed the creation of a complex of tuition-free art schools to serve talented young people from all over the Third World. He conceived of the schools as highly experimental and conceptually advanced to serve the creation of a “new culture” for the “new man”. An innovative program called for innovative architecture, and Castro saw the Cuban architect Ricardo Porro as being that architect who could deliver such architecture.

Cuba's National Art Schools represented an attempt to reinvent architecture in the same manner that the Cuban Revolution aspired to reinvent society. Through their designs, the architects sought to integrate issues of culture, ethnicity, and place into a revolutionary formal composition hitherto unknown in architecture.

== Design of the five schools ==
The design of the National Art Schools, created by Ricardo Porro, Roberto Gottardi, and Vittorio Garatti, ran counter to the dominant International Style of the time. The three architects saw the International Style as the architecture of capitalism and sought to recreate a new architecture in the image of the Cuban Revolution. These critiques of modernism existed in a broader context of critique and are considered to be notable additions to the spectrum of innovative architecture from the period. Architects such as Hugo Häring, Bruno Zevi, Ernesto Nathan Rogers, and Alvar Aalto, not to mention Frank Lloyd Wright, all practiced on the margins of mainstream modern architecture. For Porro, Gottardi, and Garatti, this international response to modernism mixed with more region-specific expressions of Hispanic and Latin American identity (long after Gaudí but sharing his Catalan influence) in the post-WWII world.

The architects set up their design studio on the site of the former country club. They decided that there would be three guiding principles for the design of the art schools. The first principle was that the architecture for the schools would be integrated with the widely varied, unusual landscape of the golf course. The second and third principles were derived from material necessity. The US embargo against Cuba, begun in 1960, had made the importation of rebar and Portland cement very costly. The architects therefore decided to use locally produced brick and terracotta tile, and for the constructive system they would use the Catalan vault with its potential for organic form. When Fidel Castro viewed the plans for the art schools, he praised their design, saying that the complex would be “the most beautiful academy of arts in the whole world”. There were five art schools within the academy: the School of Modern Dance, the School of Plastic Arts, the School of Dramatic Arts, the School of Music, and the School of Ballet.

=== School of Modern Dance – Ricardo Porro ===
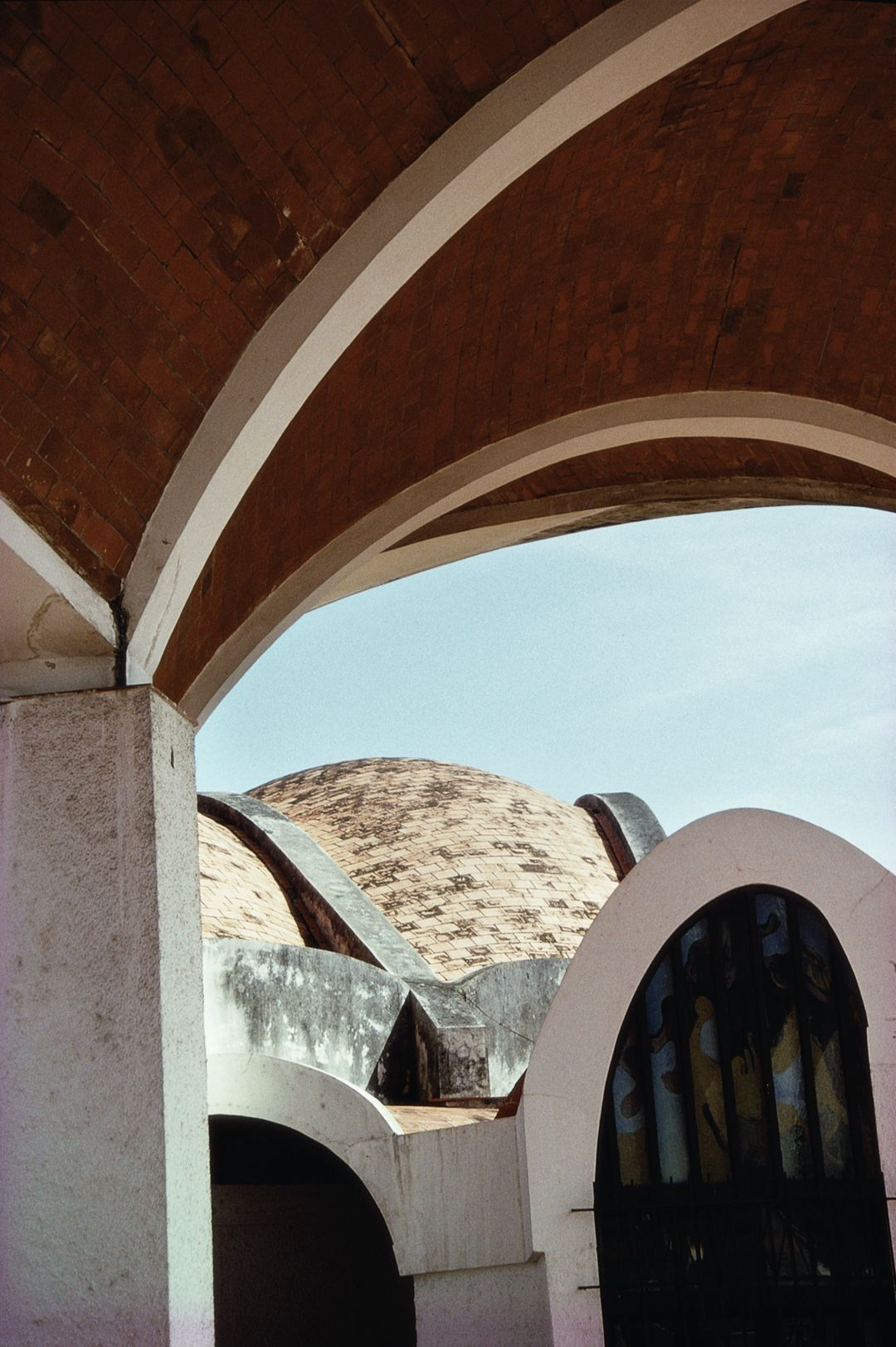
School of Modern Dance, Ricardo Porro

Porro conceived the modern dance school's plan as a sheet of glass that had been violently smashed and fragmented into shifting shards, symbolic of the revolution's violent overthrow of the old order. The fragments gather around an entry plaza - the locus of the "impact" - and develop into an urban scheme of linear, though non-rectilinear, shifting streets and courtyards. The entry arches form a hinge around which the library and administrative bar rotate away from the rest of the school. The south side of the fragmented plaza is defined by rotating dance pavilions, paired around shared dressing rooms. The north edge, facing a sharp drop in terrain, is made by two linear bars, containing classrooms, that form an obtuse angle. At the culmination of the angular procession, farthest from the entry, where the plaza once again compresses is the celebrated form of the performance theater.

=== School of Plastic Arts – Ricardo Porro ===
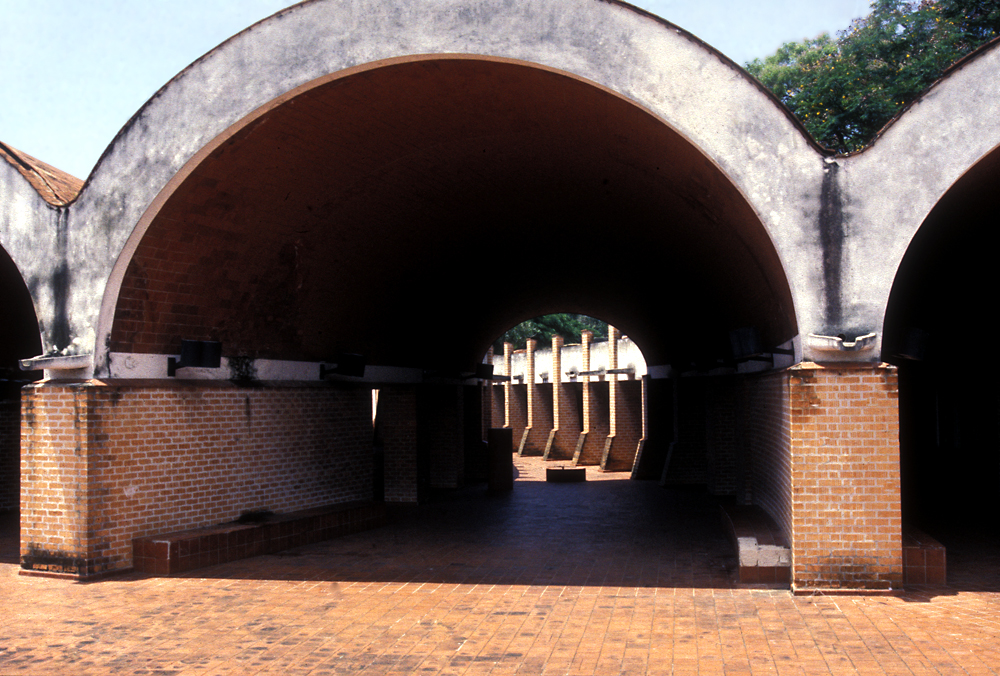
School of Plastic Arts, Ricardo Porro

The concept for this school is intended to evoke an archetypal African village, creating an organic urban complex of streets, buildings and open spaces. The studios, oval in plan, are the basic cell of the complex. Each one was conceived as a small arena theater with a central skylight to serve students working from a live model. The studios are organized along two arcs, both of which are curving colonnaded paths. Lecture rooms and offices are accommodated in a contrasting blocklike plan that is partially wrapped by and engaged with the colonnaded path. Ideas of gender and ethnicity converge in the curvilinear forms and spaces of Plastic Arts. Most notable is how the organic spatial experience of the curvilinear paseo archetectonico delightfully disorients the user not being able to fully see the extent of the magic realist journey being taken.

=== School of Dramatic Arts – Roberto Gottardi ===
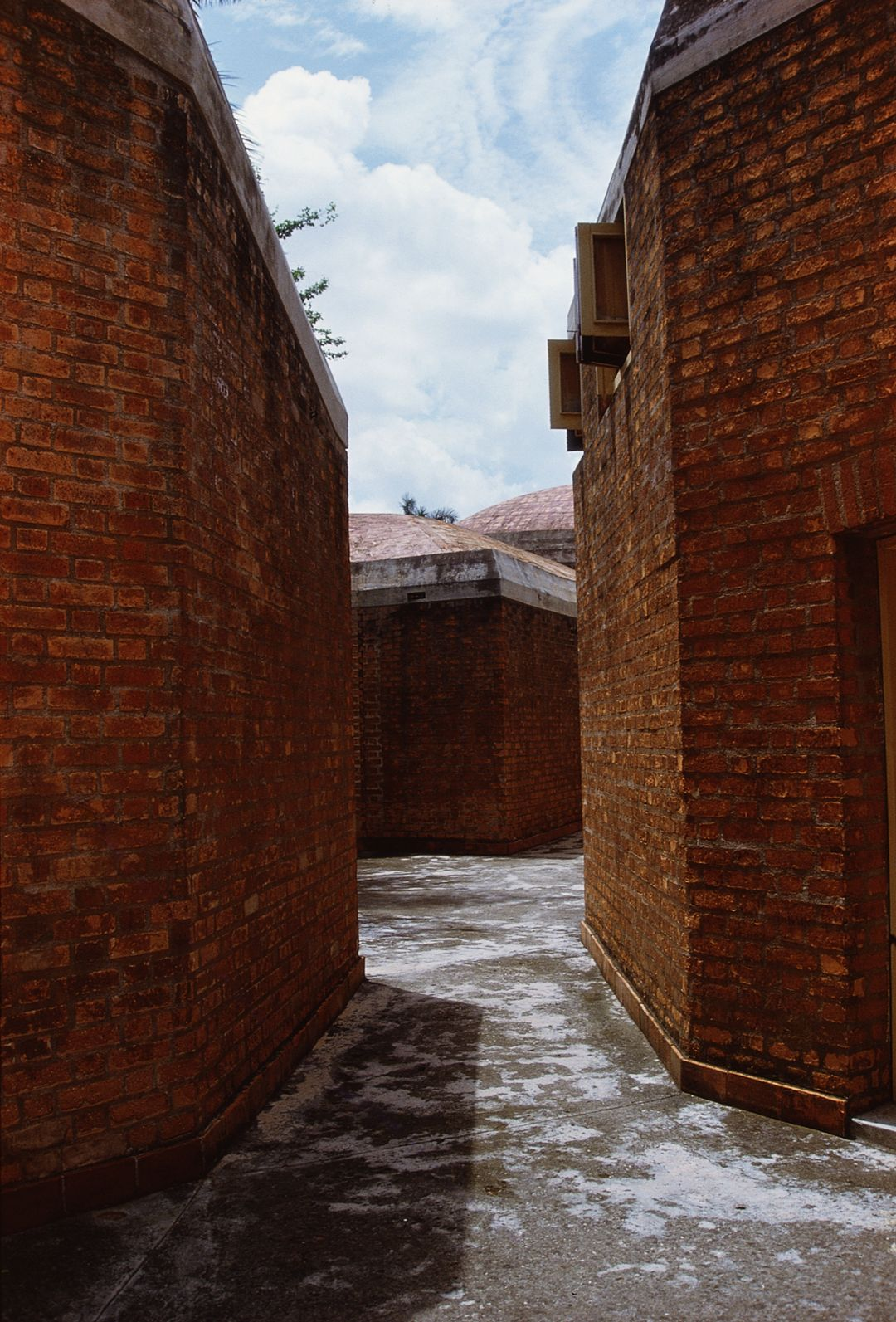
School of Dramatic Arts, Roberto Gottardi

The School of Dramatic Arts is urban in concept, as are Porro's two schools. Dramatic Arts is organized as a very compact, axial, cellular plan around a central plaza amphitheater. Its inward-looking nature creates a closed fortress-like exterior. The amphitheater, fronting the unbuilt theater at what now is the entrance, is the focal point of all the subsidiary functions, which are grouped around it. Circulation takes place in the narrow leftover interstices, open to the sky like streets, between the positive volumes of the masonry cells. Winding more or less concentrically through the complex, circulation negates the axiality and generalized symmetry that organize the plan. This presents an interesting contradiction between the formal and the experiential. While quite ordered in plan, the experience of walking through the complex is random and episodic.

=== School of Music - Vittorio Garatti ===
The School of Music is constructed as a serpentine ribbon 330 meters long, embedded in and traversing the contours of the landscape approaching the river. The scheme and its paseo arquitectonico begin where a group of curved brick planters step up from the river. This path submerges below ground as the band is joined by another layer containing group practice rooms and another exterior passage, shifted up in section from the original band. Displacements are read in the roofs as a series of stepped, or terraced, planters for flowers. This 15m wide tube, broken into two levels, is covered by undulating, layered Catalan vaults that emerge organically from the landscape, traversing the contours of the ground plane. Garatti's meandering paseo arquitectonico presents an ever-changing contrast of light and shadow, of dark subterranean and brilliant tropical environments.

=== School of Ballet – Vittorio Garatti ===
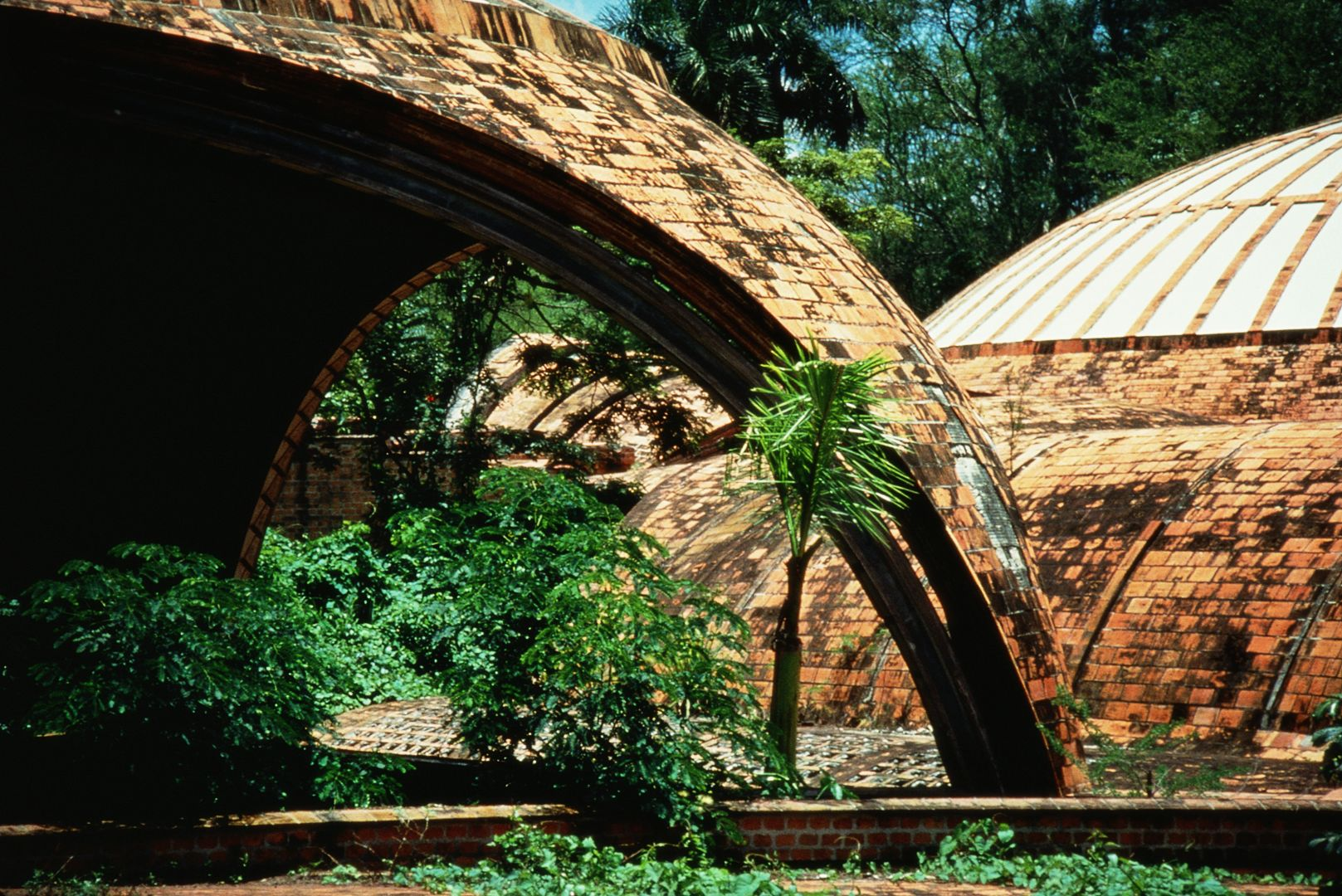
School of Ballet, Vittorio Garatti

From the top of the golf course's ravine, one looks down upon the ballet school complex, nestled into the descending gorge. The plan of the school is articulated by a cluster of domed volumes, connected by an organic layering of Catalan vaults that follow a winding path. There are at least five ways to enter the complex. The most dramatic entrance starts at the top of the ravine with a simple path bisected by a notch to carry rainwater. As one proceeds, the terra cotta cupolas, articulating the major programmatic spaces, emerge floating over lush growth. The path then descends down into the winding subterranean passage that links the classrooms and showers, three dance pavilions, administration pavilions, library and the Pantheon-like space of the performance theater. The path also leads up onto its roofs which are an integral part of Garatti's paseo arquitectonico. The essence of the design is not found in the plan but in the spatial experience of the school's choreographed volumes that move with the descending ravine.

== Decline ==
The 1962 Cuban Missile Crisis provoked an international incident that posed serious challenges for Cuba. In addition, setbacks across the Socialist world (the assassination of Congolese leader Patrice Lumumba in 1961, the coup against Algerian President Ahmed Ben Bella in 1965, the Sino-Soviet split, the newly launched guerrilla war in Vietnam), marked a turning point and created a sense of isolation and embattlement in Cuba facing the Cold War alone in the Caribbean. Production and defense became primary national priorities and the population was militarized. The government began to consider the National Art Schools to be extravagant and out of scale with reality. Construction of the art schools slowed down, as more and more of the workforce was now redirected to areas considered of greater national priority. The architects were also encountering criticism. Many in the Ministry of Construction did not trust the Catalan vault as a structural system. There was also a certain amount of envy on the part of many of the ministry bureaucrats toward the comparatively privileged conditions under which Porro, Gottardi, and Garrati were working. These tensions would prove to escalate.

As Cuba's political environment evolved from one of utopian optimism into an evermore doctrinaire structure, following models provided by the Soviet Union, the National Art Schools found themselves as subjects of repudiation. The schools were criticized for ideological errors. The architects themselves were accused of being "elitists" and "cultural aristocrats," with "egocentric" bourgeois formations. The constructive system, the Catalan vault, was now criticized as a "primitive" technology that represented "backward" values of the capitalist past. The Afro-Cuban imagery of the School of Plastic Arts was attacked as representative of “hypothetical Afro-Cuban origins” which had been “erased by slavery” and therefore held no relevance of a society advancing toward a culturally uniform socialist future.

=== Soviet-style functionalism vs. organic architecture ===
At the same time, these ideological issues also served to mask a very non-ideological drama. The National Art Schools and their architects were caught in a power struggle, with an architect named Antonio Quintana playing a major role. Quintana was a staunch modernist who, as the 1960s unfolded, embraced a Functionalist model for architecture, a model that advocated massive prefabricated production – precisely the model upon which architecture was based in the Soviet Union. This model was completely at odds with the site-specific, craft-oriented, formal poetry of the National Art Schools. Quintana quite successfully, and quickly, maneuvered his way up through the ranks of the Ministry of Construction to ever increasing power. His growing authority and outspoken criticism of the National Art Schools helped to determine their fate. In July 1965, the National Art Schools were declared finished in their various stages of completion and incompletion, and construction came to a halt.

In October 1965, Hugo Consuegra wrote a courageous defense of the National Art Schools, and their architects, that was published in the journal Arquitectura Cuba. This article was the last attempt of this period to reconcile the schools with the values of the Cuban Revolution. Consuegra described the formal complexities, spatial ambiguities, and disjunctive qualities of the schools not as in contradiction with but as characteristic and positive values of the Cuban Revolution. However, Consuegra's courageous defense proved to be in vain, and as the schools fell out of institutional favor, they were slowly abandoned. The Schools of Modern Dance and Plastic Arts continued to be used, though with little regard for their maintenance, and the Schools of Dramatic Arts, Music, and Ballet were allowed to fall into various states of abandonment and decay. The School of Ballet, nestled in a shady ravine, became completely engulfed in tropical jungle overgrowth. Ricardo Porro and later Vittorio Garatti were compelled to leave the country.

== Rehabilitation ==
In 1982, a group of young Cuban architects, all critical of the way architecture was taught and practiced in Cuba, began meeting informally. In 1988 they were given official status as a part of the Hermanos Saíz, a young artists’ organization under the auspices of the Ministry of Culture. The 1980s in Cuba were a period that produced art that was highly polemical, even protest oriented. The Ministry of Culture had a higher tolerance for discord than the Ministry of Construction, and it was for this reason that young architects sought to associate themselves there. High on their agenda was the restoration of the National Art Schools to Cuba's architectural heritage. This was not necessarily a safe position to take at this time, yet the Ministry of Culture allowed them a certain latitude within which to maneuver. By 1989 John Loomis, a North American architect and scholar, met Roberto Gottardi and the Havana Biennial of Art, and Gottardi conducted him on a tour of the schools. Moved by the compelling architecture and story, Loomis embarked on a decade-long project that produced the book Revolution of Forms, Cuba’s Forgotten Art Schools.

The 1990s were a decade of political, if not material, rehabilitation for the schools and their architects. In 1991, the Hermanos Saíz organized a provocative exhibit entitled Arquitectura Joven that was presented as part of the Fourth Havana Biennial. Prominent in the exhibition was a photomontage by Rosendo Mesias highly critical of the crumbling state of the schools. In 1995, the schools were nominated for national monument status but were rejected for not being old enough to meet criteria. Also in 1995, the U.S. photographer Hazel Hankin held an exhibit in Havana of photographs of the schools in their state of neglect. The exhibit provoked a strong response, and in 1996, upon the initiative of Cuban cultural officials, the New York architects Norma Barbacci and Ricardo Zurita prepared nomination papers on behalf of the schools for the World Monuments Fund. The schools were eventually added to the WMF watch list in 2000 and 2002. In 1997, the Cuban National Conservation Institute designated the National Art Schools as a “protected zone”.

The three architects also underwent a process of political "rehabilitation". Vittorio Garatti first returned to Cuba in June 1988 for a personal visit. Ricardo Porro returned for the first time in March 1996 for a series of public lectures, which were attended by standing-room-only audiences. Porro returned again in January 1997 to conduct a three-week design charrette with students, and give lectures. Vittorio Garatti also returned later that same year in June and lectured at the Colegio de Arquitectos. Porro returned again in 1998 to lecture, and in that same year an issue of Arquitectura Cuba was dedicated to him and his work. The subsequent issue was dedicated to Roberto Gottardi and his work. Throughout the 1990s there was much debate about the schools and this debate moved to higher and higher levels.

=== National monument status ===
1999 proved to be a critical year for the schools. In March, the book Revolution of Forms, Cuba’s Forgotten Art Schools was launched at two high-profile events. In Los Angeles the launch took place at R. M. Schindler's Kings Road House at the MAK Center, with an exhibition of photos of the schools by Paolo Gasparini taken in 1965. The event reunited Ricardo Porro, Vittorio Garatti, and Roberto Gottardi for an emotional first time since 1966, when they had last seen each other in Havana. The MAK Center event was repeated in New York at Columbia University and the Cooper-Hewitt Museum, generating copious press, including two articles in the New York Times. The exhibit went on to tour across Europe and the United States; all of the events and press coverage were closely followed by government officials in Cuba.

Revolution of Forms also became a major topic of discussion among architects in Havana. At one meeting prior to its publication a government official declared that Loomis, the author, was “an enemy of Cuba, being paid by the CIA, to write a book about the National Art Schools in order to make Cuba and the Revolution look bad”. By October 1999, however, the debate had reached the national congress of the National Union of Writers and Artists of Cuba (UNEAC) with the Council of State where the discussion was about the cultural role of architecture in Cuba. When it came to the National Art Schools, several important figures declared that the schools were the greatest architectural achievements of the Cuban Revolution. The ensuing discussion acknowledged the influence of Revolution of Forms—the international attention it had garnered and the many foreign travelers it had attracted to visit the National Art Schools. Unfortunately, the schools were in a far-from-presentable state. Shortly thereafter, Castro declared that the schools would be recognized, restored, and preserved as national monuments. Porro and Garatti were summoned to a meeting in December 1999 with government officials to plan for the restoration. In November 2011, the National Art Schools were declared monuments by the National Council of Conservation.

=== World Heritage status ===
This site was added to the UNESCO World Heritage Tentative List on February 28, 2003 in the Cultural category.

== Works inspired by the schools ==
Felipe Dulzaides, a Cuban artist, had studied at the National Art Schools and had often marveled at the beauty of the architecture there—especially the magic realist aura evoked by the group of buildings. He had been unaware of their origins until he came upon a copy of Revolution of Forms in the United States. His artistic response to the story came later that year in the form of a video-documented performance-art piece called Next Time it Rains the Water Will Run, in which he cleans out the watercourses of the abandoned School of Ballet.

The story of the National Art Schools continued to inspire Dulzaides resulting in a performance/installation in 2004 for the Proyecto Invitación in Havana, which was followed by a more extensive, and highly acclaimed, installation titled Utopía Posible at the Gwangju Biennial (South Korea) in 2008 and the Havana Biennial in 2009. This endeavor also evolved into a documentary video titled Utopía Posible—a series of penetrating, and sometimes disquieting, interviews with Gottardi about his artistic quest for meaning during his years in revolutionary Cuba.

Non-Cubans have also been inspired by the universal nature of the story of the National Art Schools. Alysa Nahmias was so moved by the schools she saw during her study abroad experience in Cuba as an undergraduate at New York University that she began working on a documentary film about the schools in 2001. The film, Unfinished Spaces, was co-directed by Ben Murray and scheduled to premiere in 2011.

San Francisco area-based filmmaker Charles Koppelman was also inspired by the schools’ story and sought a medium that would embrace all of the arts: visual arts, music, dance, and theater. His vision was for an opera, Revolution of Forms, named after the book from which he learned the schools’ story. Koppelman is producer as well as librettist along with author (and former NAS faculty member) Alma Guillermoprieto. Robert Wilson serves as director and designer, while Anthony Davis, Gonzalo Rubalcaba, and Dafnis Prieto contribute their contributions to the music. Koppelman saw that this particular journey—a universal human quest to create a better world—played itself out in a heroic and classic literary arc of passion, love, betrayal, despair, and ultimately hope. It is in production to become a multilingual opera in five acts In May 2010, music from the first two acts of Revolution of Forms was performed at the New York Opera's VOX series.

== See also ==
- Instituto Superior de Arte, successor campus to the National Schools of Art
