= Roberto Gottardi =

Italian-Cuban architect

- World Monuments Fund video on conservation of the National Schools of Art
- Born: 30 January 1927; Venice, Kingdom of Italy
- Died: 21 August 2017 (aged 90); Havana, Cuba
- Occupation: Architect

Roberto Gottardi (30 January 1927 – 21 August 2017) was an Italian-Cuban architect.

== Biography ==
Gottardi graduated in architecture from the Istituto Superiore di Architettura di Venezia (Architecture Institute of Venice) in 1952, the same class as Massimo Vignelli. While there, one of the major influences on his formative style was his mentor Carlo Scarpa, whose craft approach to architecture refuted the tenets of Rationalist modernism. Also influential was the school's iconoclastic director, Giuseppe Samoná, who like Scarpa, was an important critic of Rationalism.

After his studies in Venice, Gottardi worked in Milan for the firm BBPR under Ernesto Nathan Rogers. In 1957 he departed for Caracas upon the invitation of a Venezuelan architect whom he had met in Rogers’ office and ended up working with fellow Italian Vittorio Garatti and Cuban architect Ricardo Porro in the Banco Obrero project, led by famed architect Carlos Raúl Villanueva. Following the victory of the Cuban Revolution, Ricardo Porro invited Gottardi and Garatti to join him in the cause of building a new country. Gottardi arrived in Cuba in December 1960, and soon began work with Porro and Garatti on the ambitious project of Havana's new National Art Schools, commissioned by Fidel Castro. As part of the three-man team who designed the National Art Schools, Gottardi created the School of Dramatic Arts. He was also the only one of the National Art Schools' three primary architects to remain in the country following the mid-1960s.

Following his work on the School of Dramatic Arts (which remained unfinished in the face of political realignments in 1965 that ended work on the National Art Schools), Gottardi worked as a lecturer and professor at the Faculty of Architecture at the University of Havana. He also assumed the National Command Post of Agriculture (1967–71), the Maravilla pizzeria (1967–68), the set designs for Girón (1981) and Dédalo (1991) by choreographer Rosario Cárdenas, and the remodeling of the Caracas Restaurant y Cafeteria (actually Prado y Neptuno Restaurant) (1997–98). He lived, taught, and practiced architecture in Havana. He began working with the Cuban National Council of Conservation in 2008 on restoring and finishing the School of Dramatic Arts that had remained incomplete since 1965.

== Bibliography ==
- Loomis, John A., Revolution of Forms – Cuba's Forgotten Art Schools (Princeton Architectural Press, New York, 1999 & 2011, ISBN 978-1-56898-988-4)
- María Elena Martín and Eduardo Luis Rodríguez: Havana, Cuba: An Architectural Guide (Junta de Andalucía, Sevilla, 1998, ISBN 84-8095-143-5)
- Alysa Nahmias and Benjamin Murray: Unfinished Spaces (documentary film) Ajna Films, 2011.
- Eduardo Luis Rodríguez: The Havana Guide, Modern Architecture, 1925–1965 (Princeton Architectural Press, New York, 2000, ISBN 1-56898-210-0)
- Roberto Gottardi's National art school – Paradise lost?, Cuba Absolutely Magazine, February 2008 – retrieved 03-03-11
