= Alysa Nahmias =

American director, producer, and writer

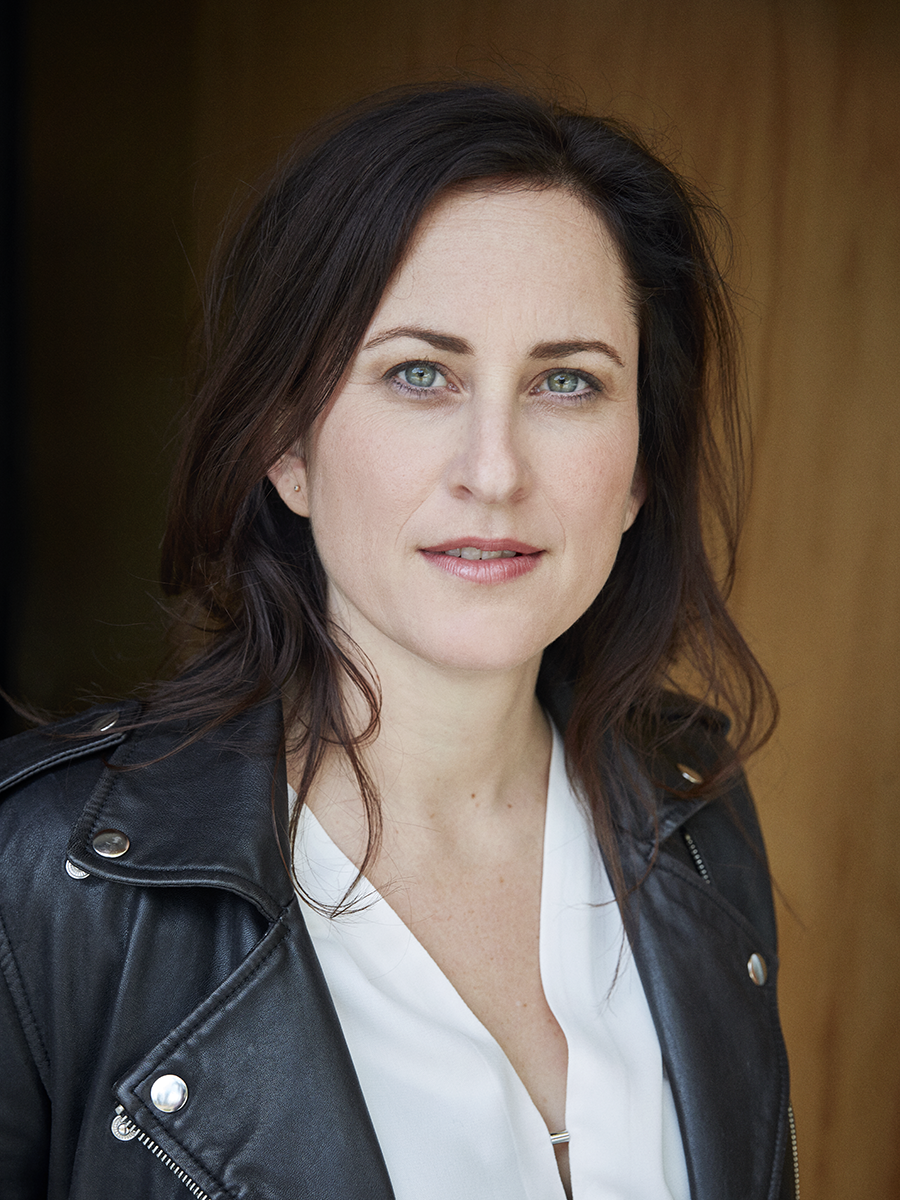
- Alysa Nahmias in 2017
- Born: Tucson, Arizona, U.S.
- Occupations: Director; producer; writer
- Years active: 2011-present
- Style: Documentary film

Alysa Nahmias is an American filmmaker and the founder of Ajna Films.

== Life ==
Nahmias is originally from Tucson, Arizona. She holds degrees from The Gallatin School of Individualized Study at New York University and Princeton University. She is married to graphic designer Rob Carmichael of SEEN Studio

== Career ==
In 2011, Nahmias directed and produced the feature documentary Unfinished Spaces, about the Cuban National Art Schools, with Benjamin Murray. The film won an Independent Spirit Award in 2012 and is part of the Museum of Modern Art's permanent collection.

Nahmias directed and produced the 2019 documentary The New Bauhaus, chronicling the art and design icon László Moholy-Nagy. The film features Moholy-Nagy's daughter, Hattula, and contemporary art curator Hans Ulrich Obrist reads Moholy-Nagy's words on screen.

Nahmias directed and produced the 2021 film Art & Krimes by Krimes, which centers on visual artist Jesse Krimes as he navigates his life and artistic career following incarceration. Art & Krimes by Krimes also features the stories and artwork of artists Russell Craig, Gilberto Rivera and Jared Owens. The film was purchased for distribution by MTV Documentary Films. In 2026, Nahmias directed and produced Cookie Queens following young women going through the Girl Scout Cookies season, with Meghan, Duchess of Sussex and Prince Harry, Duke of Sussex serving as executive producers.

Her producing credits include Unrest, by director Jennifer Brea, which won the Special Jury Award for Best Editing at the 2017 Sundance Film Festival, No Light and No Land Anywhere, by director Amber Sealey with creative advisor Miranda July; Shield and Spear, by director Petter Ringbom; What We Left Unfinished, by director Mariam Ghani; and Afternoon of a Faun: Tanaquil Le Clercq by director Nancy Buirski with creative advisor Martin Scorsese. In 2020, Alysa executive produced Weed & Wine, directed by Rebecca Richman Cohen which premiered at Hot Docs, Deauville and DOC NYC film festivals in 2020. Nahmias served as executive producer for I Didn’t See You There directed by Reid Davenport, which won the 2022 Sundance Film Festival U.S. Documentary Directing Award.

Nahmias has been featured in Filmmaker magazine as an independent film innovator. She is a 2019 Sundance Institute Momentum Fellow and a 2020 Film Independent Fellow. Nahmias co-authored a Sundance Creative Distribution Case Study on Unrest and has written about documentary grant writing for MovieMaker magazine.

Nahmias is a co-founder of FWD-Doc, a non-profit organization which supports disabled filmmakers and entertainment industry workers. Other co-founders include Jim LeBrecht, Day Al-Mohamed and Lindsey Dryden.

== Filmography ==
Film	Year	Role	Subject Matter
Unfinished Spaces	2011	Director	The National Art Schools of Cuba and the Cuban Revolution
Afternoon of a Faun: Tanaquil Le Clercq	2013	Producer	Ballerina Tanaquil Le Clercq, wife of George Ballanchine
Shield and Spear	2014	Producer	Art, music, and censorship in contemporary South Africa
No Light and No Land Anywhere	2016	Producer	A foreigner seeks connections in a city of strangers
Unrest	2017	Producer	Director Jennifer Brea turns the camera on herself to capture her struggles with chronic fatigue syndrome
What We Left Unfinished	2019	Executive Producer	Mariam Ghani tells the story of five unfinished fiction feature films from the Communist era in Afghanistan (1978–1991), and the people who went to crazy lengths to make them, in a time when films were weapons, filmmakers became targets, and the dreams of constantly shifting political regimes merged with the stories told onscreen.
The New Bauhaus	2019	Director and Producer	The life, ideas and impact of Hungarian artist László Moholy-Nagy.
Weed & Wine	2020	Executive Producer	Continents apart from one another, two farming families aim to reinvent themselves on their land.
Art & Krimes by Krimes	2021	Director and Producer	Visual artist Jesse Krimes navigates his life and career following a six-year prison sentence.
I Didn't See You There	2022	Executive Producer	Filmed entirely from director Reid Davenport's perspective as a wheelchair-using citizen of Oakland California, documenting the realities of navigating the world with a disability.
Wildcat	2022	Producer	A young British soldier struggling with depression and PTSD fosters an orphaned baby ocelot with an American scientist.
Cookie Queens	2026	Director and producer	Follows young women through the Girl Scout Cookies season.
