= Kim Roberts (filmmaker) =

American filmmaker

- Born: 1970 (age 55–56)

Kim Roberts (born 1970), A.C.E., is an American filmmaker who has worked primarily on documentaries as a film editor and writer. Roberts has a master's degree in documentary film production from Stanford University (1996). Her first credit as an editor was for Long Night's Journey into Day (2000), which was directed by Deborah Hoffmann and Frances Reid and that was nominated for the Academy Award for Best Documentary Feature. She was credited as both an editor and writer for Great Wall Across the Yangtze (2000), which was directed by Ellen Perry. Her work since then and several of her honours are sketched in the filmography below. Roberts was featured in a New York Times article on film editing in 2012. She has been selected for membership in the American Cinema Editors, which entitles editors to append "A.C.E." to their film credits.

== Selected filmography ==
This filmography is based on the listing at the Internet Movie Database. For each film, the director(s) and year of release are indicated in parentheses following the title.

- (editor) Daughter from Danang (Gail Dolgin and Vicente Franco - 2002). This film was nominated for the Academy Award for Best Documentary Feature.
- (director, writer, editor) Wilderness Survival for Girls (2004).
- (writer, editor) The Fall of Fujimori (Ellen Perry - 2005). With Perry and Zack Anderson, Roberts was nominated for Best Documentary Screenplay at the 58th Writers Guild of America Awards.
- (editor) Autism: The Musical (Tricia Regan - 2007). Roberts won the Primetime Emmy for "Outstanding Picture Editing for Nonfiction Programming".
- (writer, editor) Food, Inc. (Robert Kenner - 2009). This film was nominated for the Academy Award for Best Documentary Feature. Roberts was nominated for the "Best Editing of a Documentary" at the American Cinema Editors Awards 2010.
- (editor) Waiting for "Superman" (Davis Guggenheim - 2010). Roberts was nominated for the "Best Editing of a Documentary" at the American Cinema Editors Awards 2011.
- (sound editing) Last Call at the Oasis (Jessica Yu - 2011). Roberts was nominated for "Best Sound Editing of a Documentary" for the Golden Reel Awards of the Motion Picture Sound Editors.
- (editor) Inequality for All (Jacob Kornbluth - 2013).
- (writer, editor) Merchants of Doubt (Kenner - 2014).
- (editor) The Hunting Ground (Kirby Dick-2015).
- (editor) Unrest (Jennifer Brea - 2017).
- (editor, writer) The Silence of Others (Almudena Carracedo, Robert Bahar - 2018).
- (editor, director) Couples Therapy (Eli B. Despres, Josh Kriegman, Elyse Steinberg - 2019-2021).
- (editor) The Confession Killer (Robert Kenner, Taki Oldham - 2019).
- (editor) The Fight (Eli Despres, Josh Kriegman, Elyse Steinberg - 2020).
- (editor) Cookie Queens (Alysa Nahmias - 2026).
