= Gregory Kershaw =

American director

- Kershaw in 2026
- Occupations: Director, cinematographer

Gregory Kershaw is an American filmmaker. Kershaw co-directed alongside Michael Dweck, The Truffle Hunters (2020), Gaucho Gaucho (2024) and Burgundy (2026). He is the recipient of two American Society of Cinematographers awards, an Directors Guild of America Award for Outstanding Directorial Achievement in Documentary, and has received nominations at the Producers Guild Awards, Independent Spirit Awards and the International Documentary Association.

== Early life ==
Kershaw attended Columbia University School of the Arts, graduating with a MFA in Film Directing.

== Career ==
Kershaw worked as a senior producer at Fusion TV, producing environmental documentaries.

He is a frequent collaborator with Michael Dweck, with their collaboration beginning in 2018, with The Last Race, a documentary revolving around Riverhead Raceway, where Kershaw served as producer, writer, and cinematographer. It had its world premiere at the 2018 Sundance Film Festival, and was acquired by Magnolia Pictures. The two also co-founded Beautiful Stories, a production company which has produced Cookie Queens by Alysa Nahmias.

In 2020, Kershaw co-directed, produced, and served as cinematographer on The Truffle Hunters which had its world premiere at the 2020 Sundance Film Festival, and was acquired by Sony Pictures Classics. Luca Guadagnino served as a producer. The film received critical acclaim, receiving nominations at the 32nd Producers Guild of America Awards, and the 5th Critics' Choice Documentary Awards. Kershaw won the Directors Guild of America Award for Outstanding Directorial Achievement in Documentary, Cinema Eye Honors Outstanding Achievement in Cinematography, American Society of Cinematographers Outstanding Achievement in Cinematography, It was listed as one of the top five documentaries of 2020 by the National Board of Review. and was shortlisted for the 93rd Academy Awards.

In 2024, Kershaw co-directed, produced, and served as cinematographer on Gaucho Gaucho revolving around a teenage girl joining the Gaucho culture. It had its world premiere at the 2024 Sundance Film Festival, where it won the U.S. Documentary Special Jury Award. It also screened at the 77th Locarno Film Festival where it won the inaugural Letterboxd Piazza Grande Award. It was nominated for the Producers Guild of America Award for Best Documentary Motion Picture, Best Documentary Feature at the 40th Independent Spirit Awards, and won the American Society of Cinematographers Outstanding Achievement in Cinematography.

In 2026, Kershaw co-directed, produced, and served as cinematographer on Burgundy focusing on Burgundy in France. It had its world premiere out of competition of the 83rd Venice International Film Festival and will also screen at the 53rd Telluride Film Festival.
