= Gaucho Gaucho =

2024 Documentary film

- Directed by: Michael Dweck; Gregory Kershaw
- Produced by: Michael Dweck; Gregory Kershaw; Cameron O’Reilly; Christos V. Konstantakopoulos; Matthew Perniciaro
- Cinematography: Michael Dweck; Gregory Kershaw
- Edited by: Gabriel Rhodes
- Production companies: Beautiful Stories Productions; Artemis Rising Foundation; Foothill Productions; Grazka Taylor Productions; Impact Partners
- Distributed by: Jolt.Film
- Release date: 2024
- Running time: 84 minutes
- Countries: United States; Argentina
- Language: Spanish

Gaucho Gaucho is a 2024 is a black-and-white documentary film directed by Michael Dweck and Gregory Kershaw. The film, set in the lack of water-threatened northwestern cattle country of Argentina, captures the lives of gauchos. It premiered at the 2024 Sundance Film Festival, where it won a Special Jury Prize for Sound. The documentary received an outdoor screening in August 2024 on the Piazza Grande of the 77th Locarno Film Festival and won the first Letterboxd Piazza Grande Award.

== Plot ==
The documentary follows several characters, including Guada, a teenage girl aspiring to join the male-dominated gaucho culture. Her journey serves as a narrative thread, showcasing her challenges and growth in the rodeo circuit.

== Cast ==
- Guada (a teenage girl)
- Santino (a local musician and radio host)
- Solano
- Lelo

== Production ==
Following their film The Truffle Hunters, Michael and Gregory turned their attention to the gauchos in the remote regions of Argentina. It took over two years for Dweck and Kershaw to learn about the lives of these cowboys and cowgirls.

== Release ==
Gaucho Gaucho premiered at the 2024 Sundance Film Festival.

== Reception ==
Gaucho Gaucho received critical acclaim at its Sundance premiere, where it won a Jury Prize for sound. Variety’s Guy Lodge described it as a “perfectly framed,” “loving, visually resplendent documentary” that "gives the Argentine cowboy community ample space to bond and merge". Senior US Critic, Tim Grierson from Screen Daily said Gaucho Gaucho is "An affecting tone poem that ruminates on the passage of time and the passing of traditions".

On review aggregator website Rotten Tomatoes, the film holds an approval rating of 94% based on 18 reviews, with an average rating of 7.4/10.
