= Daddy & Papa =

- Directed by: Johnny Symons
- Written by: Johnny Symons
- Produced by: Johnny Symons
- Starring: Johnny Symons; William Rogers
- Narrated by: Johnny Symons
- Cinematography: Gail Huddleson; Johnny Symons; Andy Abrahams Wilson
- Edited by: Kim Roberts
- Music by: Janice Giteck; David Conley; Glenys Rogers
- Distributed by: ITVS; New Day Films
- Release date: January 11, 2002 (Sundance Film Festival)
- Running time: 57 minutes
- Country: United States
- Language: English

Daddy & Papa is a 2002 documentary film made by Johnny Symons. It explores same-sex parenting as seen in the lives of four families headed by male couples. The film also examines the legal, social, and political challenges faced by gay parents and their children.

Filmmaker Symons and his partner William Rogers, along with their adopted son, Zachary, were one of the four families featured in the film. Symons says of the project,

I wanted to document this phenomenon: what it means for out gay men to form their own families - for the dads, for the kids, for their extended families and schools and communities and the thousands of mainstream people who are being changed by their exposure to a new kind of family.

Daddy & Papa was shown nationwide in the U.S. on PBS in the spring of 2003 as part of its Independent Lens series. The film was scheduled for rebroadcast on the LOGO channel in August 2007.

== Awards ==
The highly acclaimed documentary won numerous awards, including:

- Emmy Award nomination, Best Documentary
- Official selection, Sundance Film Festival
- Golden Gate Award, Best First Person Documentary, San Francisco International Film Festival
- Audience Award for Best Documentary, Florida Film Festival
- Runner up for Best Film, Cleveland International Film Festival
- Documentary Most Likely to Change the World, Detroit Docs Film Festival
- Audience Award for Best Documentary, 1st Runner Up, Seattle International Film Festival
- Breaking the Mold Award, Newport Film Festival
- Best Documentary, Miami Gay and Lesbian Film Festival
- Outstanding Documentary Nominee, GLAAD Media Awards
- Honorary Mention, Best Feature Documentary, Oakland International Film Festival
- Best Documentary, Dallas OUTTakes
- Best Documentary, Connecticut Gay & Lesbian Film Festival
- Best Documentary, University of Oregon Queer Film Festival
- Audience Award for Best Documentary, Portland Lesbian & Gay Film Festival
- Audience Award for Best Feature, Out at the Movies
- Audience Award for Best Independent Documentary, ImageOut/Rochester Gay and Lesbian Film Festival
- Audience Award for Best Film and Audience Award for Best Documentary, Orinda Film Festival
- Silver Certificate of Merit, Prix Leonardo
- Best Documentary, North Carolina Gay & Lesbian Film Festival
- Official Selection, Input (International Public Television) Conference, Aarhus, Denmark
- Special Mention, Icelandic Lesbian & Gay Film Festival
