= Ask Not =

Ask Not is a phrase associated with John F. Kennedy's inaugural address: "And so, my fellow Americans: ask not what your country can do for you—ask what you can do for your country."

Ask Not may also refer to:

- Ask Not, a 2008 documentary film directed by Johnny Symons about the impact of the "don't ask, don't tell" policy in the U.S. military
- "Ask Not", a 2019 episode of the American television series Star Trek: Short Treks
- Ask Not: The Kennedys and the Women They Destroyed, a 2024 book by Maureen Callahan
