= The Last Race =

The Last Race may refer to:

- The Last Race (1954 film), an Italian drama film
- The Last Race (2018 film), an American documentary film
- The Last Race (2022 film), a Czech historical sport drama film
- On Wings of Eagles (film), also titled The Last Race, a 2016 Chinese-Hong Kong-American historical sports drama film
