= Cookie Queens =

2026 American documentary film

- Theatrical release poster
- Directed by: Alysa Nahmias
- Produced by: Alysa Nahmias; Gregory Kershaw; Michael Dweck; Jennifer Sims
- Cinematography: Antonio Cisneros
- Edited by: Kim Roberts; Jeanne Applegate; Fátima de los Santos
- Music by: Amanda Jones
- Production companies: AJNA Films; Beautiful Stories
- Distributed by: Roadside Attractions
- Release dates: January 25, 2026 (Sundance); August 7, 2026 (United States)
- Running time: 91 minutes
- Country: United States
- Language: English
- Box office: $643,529

Cookie Queens is a 2026 American documentary film directed and produced by Alysa Nahmias. It explores the joys, pains, and pressures of the Girl Scout Cookies season. It had its world premiere at the 2026 Sundance Film Festival on January 25, 2026, and was released on August 7, 2026, by Roadside Attractions.

== Premise ==
Cookie Queens follows four tenacious girls striving to be a top-seller of Girl Scout Cookies.

== Production and release ==
The film was produced by Michael Dweck, Gregory Kershaw, Alysa Nahmias and Jennifer Sims. It was a Beautiful Stories & AJNA Films production, in association with Archewell Productions, Good Gravy Films and Artemis Rising Foundation.

The film was one of 32 receiving support in 2025 from the Sundance Documentary Fund.

It had its world premiere at the 2026 Sundance Film Festival on January 25, 2026. In March 2026, Roadside Attractions acquired U.S. distribution rights. It was released on August 7, 2026. It is scheduled to be released on Paramount+ on January 6, 2027.

== Reception ==
On the review aggregator website Rotten Tomatoes, 91% of 56 critics' reviews are positive, though viewers were less positive. The website's consensus reads: "Cookie Queens is as much an insightful inquiry into adolescence as it is a tour through a time-honored tradition, making for a documentary that's chock-full of feel-good crumbs." The Hollywood Reporter praised Nahmais' direction and called it an "irresistible doc". POV Magazine said it was "terrific" and "emotionally rich". Patrick Gibbs for SLUG Magazine wrote "It’s likely to be a big crowd pleaser, and it achieves most of its goals quite splendidly." However, Variety argued that Cookie Queens is a shallow, reality-show-style look at Girl Scout cookie sales that misses the broader history and meaning of the tradition, ultimately seeing the girls' entrepreneurship as "cold hard cash".

Despite receiving a U.S. wide launch in 446 theaters, its opening weekend box office was under £250,000 ($327,000) and total domestic was $513,148 according to Box Office Mojo.
