= Day Al-Mohamed =

Policy advocate, writer and filmmaker

- Born: December 25, 1979 (age 46)
- Education: University of Missouri-Columbia
- Occupations: Policy advocate, writer, and filmmaker
- Notable work: RENEGADES series, The Labyrinth’s Archivist
- Website: dayalmohamed.com

Day Al-Mohamed ([Arabic: الْمُحَمَّد دي]; born December 25, 1975,) is a Bahrain-born policy advocate, writer, and filmmaker based in the United States. Both her policy career and creative work have an emphasis on underrepresented and historically marginalized communities.) She is visually impaired and uses a guide dog to navigate.

== Early life and education ==
Al-Mohamed grew up in Bahrain where she attended Department of Defense Education Activity (DoDEA) Bahrain School, where she graduated with an American high school diploma and an International Baccalaureate diploma. She moved to the United States to attend college at the University of Missouri. Al-Mohamed became blind as the result of a brain injury in 1995, while she was studying social work at the University of Missouri. She fenced at the college level with foil, placing third in the 1997 state fencing championship. After finishing her undergraduate degree, she continued at the University of Missouri as a law student, where she earned her JD in 2003.

== Policy career ==
Al-Mohamed has worked on several well-known pieces of legislation including an active role in the Americans with Disabilities Act ADA Amendments Act of 2008 (ADAAA). The ADAAA was a response to judicial decisions in the intervening years since passage of the Americans with Disabilities Act that narrowed the interpretation of the ADA and limited the rights of people with disabilities. As a co-chair of the 2005 Consortium for Citizens with Disabilities Rights Task Force, Al-Mohamed worked to develop a consensus Statement of Principles for amending the ADA and hosted early meetings for the disability community in which initial language ideas were considered. She submitted written testimony at the House Committee on the Judiciary subcommittee hearing and lobbied members of Congress and the Bush Administration to garner support for the amendment language.

Based on the successful collaboration behind passage of the ADAAA, Al-Mohamed and Daniel E. Dawes created a National Working Group on Health Disparities and Health Reform to advocate for a health equity agenda in the Patient Protection and Affordable Care Act (ACA). The coalition included more than 400 organizations representing women, children, older adults, racial and ethnic minorities, the LGBT community and those with disabilities, as well as faith-based, industry, and corporate groups such as insurance and hospital associations. This diverse group cooperatively developed specific language and recommendations to address health and healthcare disparities and lobbied successfully for their inclusion in the ACA.

Al-Mohamed also lobbied for the Matthew Shepard and James Byrd Jr. Hate Crimes Prevention Act and, though it did not pass, the Employment Non-Discrimination Act, which she fought to make trans-inclusive.

In 2022, Al-Mohamed was detailed for 1 year to the White House as Director of Disability Policy. There, she worked on expanding competitive integrated employment opportunities for people with disabilities, increasing funding for school-based support services for disabled children and their families, and overseeing the release of guidance to avoid discriminatory school discipline. Al-Mohamed provided language to strengthen supports for home care workforce, and for the National Action Plan for Long Covid as well as disability language for the White House Blueprint for Addressing the Maternal Health Crisis and the Blueprint for an AI Bill of Rights. Among her other activities was implementing efforts to advance diversity, equity, inclusion, and accessibility (DEIA), including specifically highlighting work of the Biden-Harris Administration to support Black disabled Americans. And although the final rule only appeared in the Federal Register on March 27, 2024, Al-Mohamed spearheaded the effort to omit food from in-kind support and maintenance calculations for Supplemental Security recipients, as well as other SSI enhancements.

As of 2020, Al-Mohamed works for the Occupational Safety and Health Administration under the US Department of Labor. One of her major projects with the department has been the Add Us In initiative to increase the employment of disabled individuals through work with small business associations. She also serves in the US Coast Guard Auxiliary and the Montgomery County Commission on People with Disabilities.

In the past, Al-Mohamed worked with the American Psychological Association and the American Council of the Blind.

== Writing and filmmaking ==
Al-Mohamed is a founding member of FWD-Doc, a non-profit organization which supports disabled filmmakers and entertainment industry workers. Other co-founders include Jim LeBrecht, Alysa Nahmias and Lindsey Dryden.

Since 2007, she has hosted the Day in Washington podcast about disability policy.

She has written the young adult novel Baba Ali and the Clockwork Djinn, and has published short stories in various magazines.

=== Filmmaking ===
She directed the Civil War documentary The Invalid Corps, about the contributions of disabled veterans. The Invalid Corps was accepted to the American Presidents Film and Literary Festival in 2019.

She was a producer of the 2024 UNSEEN. She is also a creator of Renegades, a docu-series about disabled leaders in history, which is set to release on American Masters/PBS digital in October 2024.

== Recognition ==
- 2021 Documentary New Leader (FWD-Doc)
- 2022 Original Voices Fellowship member (NBC)
- 2023 D-30 Disability Impact List (Diversability)

== Personal life ==
As of 2024, Al-Mohamed lives in Silver Spring, Maryland with her wife, daughter, and guide dog.
