= Wilderness Survival for Girls =

2004 film

- Directed by: Eli B. Despres; Kim Roberts
- Written by: Eli B. Despres; Kim Roberts
- Starring: Jeanette Brox; Ali Humison; Megan Henning; James Morrison
- Cinematography: Robin Melhuish
- Edited by: Eli B. Despres; Kim Roberts
- Music by: B. Quincy Griffin; Hector H. Perez
- Release date: 2004
- Running time: 78 min.
- Country: United States
- Language: English

Wilderness Survival for Girls is a 2004 independent thriller film directed by Eli B. Despres and Kim Roberts and starring Jeanette Brox, Ali Humison, Megan Henning, and James Morrison. It was shot in 18 days.

== Premise ==
Three soon-to-graduate high school girls stay at a mountain cabin. A stranger named Ed comes to their cabin. They manage to overpower him and tie him to a chair. The film shows the girls' responses to their captive stranger.

== Reception ==
Scott Weinberg of DVD Talk said that although the film is not entirely successful, credit is due the writers/directors for their original script. Sid Smith of the Chicago Tribune ended his review by saying that viewers are likely to leave with something to think about. Robert Koehler of Variety commented on James Morrison, "a superb, nuanced and inexplicably underused actor on the big screen, is able to shift between vulnerability and being a real threat in the physically contained yet wide-ranging role."
