= Complaints of a Dutiful Daughter =

1994 film

- Directed by: Deborah Hoffmann
- Written by: Deborah Hoffmann
- Produced by: Deborah Hoffmann
- Cinematography: Frances Reid
- Distributed by: Women Make Movies
- Release date: 1994
- Running time: 44 minutes
- Country: United States
- Language: English

Complaints of a Dutiful Daughter is a 1994 American documentary film directed by Deborah Hoffmann, with her wife, Frances Reid, as cinematographer.

== Summary ==
The film is about the struggle with Alzheimer's disease of Doris Hoffmann, mother of the director and widow of Albert Einstein's associate Banesh Hoffmann.

Complaints of a Dutiful Daughter aired on PBS as part of the series POV.

== Accolades ==
It was nominated for an Academy Award for Best Documentary Feature.
