= The Brotherhood of Poland, New Hampshire =

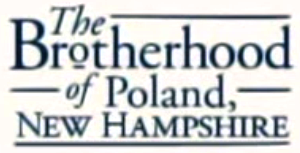
- Genre: Drama
- Created by: David E. Kelley
- Starring: Mare Winningham; Randy Quaid; Ann Cusack; Christopher Penn; Elizabeth McGovern; John Carroll Lynch
- Composer: W.G. Snuffy Walden
- Country of origin: United States
- Original language: English
- No. of seasons: 1
- No. of episodes: 9 (4 unaired)

Production
- Executive producers: David E. Kelley; Michael Pressman
- Camera setup: Single-camera
- Running time: 60 minutes
- Production companies: David E. Kelley Productions; 20th Century Fox Television

Original release
- Network: CBS
- Release: September 24 – October 22, 2003

The Brotherhood of Poland, New Hampshire is an American drama television series created by David E. Kelley that aired on CBS from September 24 to October 22, 2003. The show offers the typical quirkiness and eccentric humor that have become synonymous with David E. Kelley's shows. The Brotherhood of Poland, New Hampshire has been described as "Northern Exposure with middle-aged angst and populated with the sort of oddball supporting characters so typical of the Kelley oeuvre." The show was canceled after five episodes due to low ratings.

== Plot ==
The show focuses on the families of three brothers in the fictional town of Poland, New Hampshire, one is a police chief, the other is a mayor, and the last one is out of work. Local heroes in their youth, they are now tackling grown-up problems such as the economy, their children's educations, and their families. As in most families, the brothers know they'll always have each other to help weather the storms of their changing lives. The show has been compared to Picket Fences, another show by creator David E. Kelley.

== Cast ==
- Randy Quaid as Hank Shaw, the police chief.
- John Carroll Lynch as Garrett Shaw, the mayor of Poland, NH.
- Chris Penn as Waylon Shaw, the brother down on his luck.
- Mare Winningham as Dottie Shaw, wife of Hank. She does not enjoy living in Poland, NH.
- Elizabeth McGovern as Helen Shaw, wife of Garrett.
- Ann Cusack as Julie Shaw, wife of Waylon.
- Angela Goethals as Katie Shaw, daughter of Waylon and Julie.
- Megan Henning as Monica Shaw, daughter of Garrett and Helen.
- Cleo King as Francine Hill, a police officer in Poland who works with Hank.
- Jodi Benson as A Soloist of the Choir

== Production ==
The pilot was filmed in Plymouth, New Hampshire in 2003, as were the exterior establishing shots and main title scenes. Filming of the series was then relocated to Pasadena, California. Brian Haley was originally cast in the role of Waylon Shaw, but was replaced with Chris Penn after filming the pilot episode. Haley's scenes were reshot with Penn, but the pilot was eventually scrapped and never aired.

== Episodes ==
No.	Title	Directed by	Written by	Original release date	Prod. code
1	"Pilot"	Michael Pressman & Ron Lagomarsino	David E. Kelley	September 24, 2003	1AHQ01
Hank is troubled when his wife confesses that she hates living in Poland; Garrett is blackmailed by a former lover who threatens to expose their past affair if he doesn't pay her; Waylon is convinced that his wife is cheating on him.
2	"Falling Acorns"	Michael Pressman & Ron Lagomarsino	David E. Kelley	October 1, 2003	1AHQ02
Garrett is blackmailed by a former lover and Dottie tries to get enough money to buy the town's closed movie theater.
3	"Secrets and Lies"	Ron Lagomarsino & Michael Pressman	David E. Kelley	October 8, 2003	1AHQ03
Hank does not support Dottie as he begins to blackmail Sharon Ropers about her affair with Garret. Garrett considers telling Helen about his affair with Sharon, now that their daughter knows the truth; Dottie holds early auditions in the theater for the spring Easter pageant but they don't go as planned.
4	"Tough Love"	Ron Lagomarsino	David E. Kelley	October 15, 2003	1AHQ04
Because of the compliments she keeps getting from a handsome young banker Dottie thinks he wants to sleep with her, but she can't convince Julie. Waylon goes into business for himself selling ice cream from a truck, but encounters hostile opposition from an unexpected source. Monica shocks her parents when she tells them that she wants to have sex with her boyfriend.
5	"Sleeping Lions"	Bill D'Elia	David E. Kelley	October 22, 2003	1AHQ05
The Shaw brothers are shocked when their minister, who is also a lifelong friend, tells them that he is gay. The minister ask for their support when he gives the news to his congregation. Each brother refuses to support their friend, which stirs controversy at home with their wives.
6	"Little Girl Lost"	Ron Lagomarsino	David E. Kelley	Unaired	1AHQ06
The parents of a teenage girl fear that their daughter has been the victim of foul play when she goes missing after a fight with her boyfriend. The brothers adopt strange methods to help find her, including a crime-sniffing Chihuahua. Meanwhile, talk of the girl's sex life leads the women to wonder about their own children's possible sexual activities.
7	"The Song of Poland"	Bill D'Elia	David E. Kelley	Unaired	1AHQ07
Waylon asks Hank to help find out the truth about Julie's possible indiscreet relations. Hank punches Haggis and breaks his nose. Their beloved music teacher's death brings the brothers together in song, but Hank thinks the man may have been murdered. Garrett is busy making deals to improve his chances of re-election as mayor. Dottie considers turning the old movie theater into a nightclub.
8	"Shaw-Shank Redemption"	Bill D'Elia	David E. Kelley	Unaired	1AHQ08
Waylon hurts his leg, but he won't explain how he injured himself. Garrett prepares for a mayoral debate against a candidate whose popularity is rapidly increasing. Helen considers an outpatient surgical procedure that will supposedly enhance her love life. Hank takes away the driver's license of an elderly man who drove his car into a restaurant.
9	"Thanksgiving"	Bill D'Elia	David E. Kelley	Unaired	1AHQ09
A basketball tournament keeps Poland on its toes. Hank arrests a woman for drunken driving and Waylon invites her over for Thanksgiving dinner. Garrett wins re-election but his excitement is tempered when his brothers tell him that he's not a good mayor. Waylon tries to get Julie to dress sexier.
