= Janice Giteck =

American composer

Janice Giteck (born June 27, 1946 in New York), is an American composer.

== Biography ==
Giteck grew up in Hicksville, Long Island and moved to Arizona when she was twelve years old. She attended Mills College, completing her Master's in 1969 and studying under Darius Milhaud. She later studied under Olivier Messiaen, and following this she studied Indonesian gamelan music with Daniel Schmidt and percussion with Obo Addy. Her works came into wide circulation in the 1970s and 1980s, with a style heavily influenced by world music and the music of American Indians. Awards for her music include the National Endowment for the Arts Composer's award for Breathing Songs from a Turning Sky, and the Norman Fromm Composers Award for Thunder, Like a White Bear Dancing. Giteck returned to school and received a Master's in psychology in 1986, and worked in the mental health field from 1986 to 1991. She has taught at Cornish College of the Arts in Seattle since 1979. Her 1992 recording collection Home (Revisited), released on New Albion, is dedicated to AIDS patients. Her music has been described as influenced by world and ritual music.

In a 1999 joint interview with composer Ann Sandifur, Giteck and Sandifur described themselves as “life-oriented, not career oriented,” noting that they sought to be “versatile rather than specialized.”

== Discography ==
- New Performance Group in Music (Mode Records, 1988)
- Home (Revisited) (New Albion, 1992)

== Partial list of works ==
- Thunder, Like a White Bear Dancing (1977)
- Callin' Home Coyote (1978)
- TREE (1981) commissioned by San Francisco Symphony
- Soundtrack, Hopi:Songs of the Fourth World (1983)
- Breathing Songs from a Turning Sky (1980; revised 1984)
- Om Shanti (1986)
- Soundtrack, Hearts and Hands (1987)
- Tapasya (1987)
- Leningrad Spring (1992)
- Home (Revisited) (1992)
- Soundtrack, Rabbit in the Moon (1999)
- Soundtrack, Daddy & Papa (2002)
- Ishi (2004) commissioned by Seattle Chamber Players
- Accompanying music to Rene Yung's installation Four Dignities (2005)
