= Jesse Krimes =

American artist and curator (born on 13 November 1982)

- Born: November 13, 1982 (age 44); Lancaster, Pennsylvania
- Education: B.A., Millersville University
- Known for: Mural art, art installations, sculpture
- Website: www.jessekrimes.com

pp

Jesse Krimes (born 1982 in Lancaster, Pennsylvania) is an American visual artist and curator, who focuses on criminal injustice and contemporary perceptions of criminality.

== Career ==
In 2009, after graduating from Millersville University, Krimes was arrested for cocaine possession. While awaiting sentencing for possession of cocaine with intent to distribute, he spent a year in solitary confinement. It was during this time that Krimes decided "to create something positive in the world”.

"Everything could be taken from me, except my ability to create"

— Jesse Krimes

During this time, he devised a way using hair gel and toothpaste to hand-transfer images of individuals labeled as offenders in newspapers onto 292 bars of prison-issued soap. The soap bars were then embedded into carved playing cards to examine an array of issues, including the failures of the American justice system. He then shipped them discreetly out of prison. This ultimately became Purgatory (2009), which was on view at The Metropolitan Museum of Art in New York. Purgatory, along with other works by Krimes, was exhibited at the Museum in Jesse Krimes: Corrections; the exhibit paired Krimes' work with "...nineteenth-century photographs from The Met collection by the French criminologist Alphonse Bertillon, who developed the first modern system of criminal identification before the adoption of fingerprinting."

He was sentenced to six years in prison, and subsequently served five years. In his last three years of his sentence, he was able to gain access to art supplies and was able to produce numerous pieces and mentor others. Krimes explained that “artwork facilitated conversation" and humanized him to some of the guards.”

Upon his release he co-founded Right of Return USA, a fellowship program to support previously incarcerated artists.

In 2016, JPMorgan Chase settled a lawsuit with Krimes, acting as plaintiff, for charging exorbitant fees for a debit card program that was supposed to help released inmates.

Krimes has collaborated and received public commissions with a focus on prison reform including Amnesty International, Ford Foundation, Open Philanthropy, and the City of Philadelphia Mural Arts’ Restorative Justice program, to name a few. Krimes was awarded fellowships by Robert Rauschenberg Foundation in 2017, the Independence Foundation in the same year, and the Ford Foundation’s Art For Justice initiative in 2018. Krimes is represented by Burning in Water Gallery in New York.

Krimes was the subject of the 2021 documentary film Art & Krimes by Krimes, directed by Alysa Nahmias.

== Work Chronology ==
Selected chronology of showcased artwork.

- The Space Between (2006)
- Coercion (2008)
- Apokaluptein:16389067 (2014) artist
- Amnesty International Commission (2015)
- Marking Time in America: The Prison Works (2009-2013) (2016) solo show for artist
- Deus Ex Machina aka God from the Machine (2016)
- Stones, Zips, and Remnants; AP. Voices (2017)
- Portraits of Justice (2018), co-curator with Russell Craig, artist, City of Philadelphia Mural Arts Program
- Museum of Broken Windows (2018) artist
- Prison Nation (2018), artist
- The OG Experience (2019), co-curator with Russell Craig, artist
- Emanation 2019 (2019) artist
- Art as Freedom (2019) artist
- American Rendition at Malin (2020)
- Elegy Quilts. (2021)
