= Ann Sandifur =

Ann Elizabeth Sandifur (born 14 May 1949) is an American business woman, composer, teacher and writer. She has produced several electronic and multimedia works.

== Biography ==
Sandifur was born in Spokane, Washington. She earned a BA at Eastern Washington University as well as a BA in composition and a MFA in electronic music and recording media at Mills College in California. She also studied at the University of California (Berkeley). Her teachers included Robert Ashley, Charles Bestor, Paul Creston, Alden Jenks, and Stanley Lunetta. After graduating, Sandifur taught music, broadcast engineering, and radio and television communications.

In 1969, Sandifur received third prize in a Mu Phi Epsilon competition for her composition Prenatal. She received a grant from the National Center for Experiments in Television, based in San Francisco. During the early 1970s, Sandifur’s works were performed by MAFISHCO at the Cat’s Paw Palace of Performing Arts, a major alternative theatre in East Bay, California. Later in the 1970s, she worked with David Tudor’s performance group, Composers Inside Electronics (CIE).

As a business woman, Sandifur founded the Rosonant Communications Network. She was vice president and in charge of data processing at the Metropolitan Mortgage and Securities Company from 1980 to 1982. In 1983, she completed a 5-year commission from Metropolitan Mortgage and Securities to create Cosmography, a multimedia sculpture.

In a 1999 joint interview with composer Janice Giteck, Sandifur and Giteck described themselves as “life-oriented, not career oriented,” noting that they sought to be “versatile rather than specialized.”

Sandifur belongs to the Phi Lambda Chapter of Mu Phi Epsilon. Her music is published by Arsciene Publishing. Her compositions include:

== Chamber ==
- Double Chamber Music
- Prenatal (chamber ensemble)
- Still, Still (mixed chorus, flute, oboe, electronic piano and double bass)
- Suite for Oboe

== Electronic ==
- Big Belly
- Biorhythms of Performance
- Bridging Space
- Columbia River (synthesizer, electronic and acoustic pianos)
- Five Part Fugue for the Collective Consciousness
- Fugue for Touch
- In Celebration of Movement (piano and tape)
- Jona One
- Learning to Talk (voice and synthesizer)
- Poetry is Sleeping (voice and tape)
- P.P.G.
- Rite of Birth
- TVCOMOO1.TEL (synthesizer)

== Keyboard ==
- Scored Improvisations (acoustic or electric keyboard)
- Shared Improvisations (four hand piano)

== Multimedia ==
- Cosmography (multimedia statue)
- Letting Go of Home (musical sculpture)
- Word Park (musical Sculpture)

== Theatre ==
- I Extol the Nestle and Cuddle
- Sequence II
