= Megan Henning =

American former actress

- Born: Baltimore, Maryland, United States
- Occupation: Actress
- Years active: 2000–2013

Megan Henning is an American former actress. She is known for playing Meredith Davies on 7th Heaven and Monica Shaw on David E. Kelley's The Brotherhood of Poland, New Hampshire. From 2008 to 2009 she played the recurring role of Judy Hofstadt, Betty Draper's compassionate sister-in-law, on Mad Men.

== Filmography ==
=== Film ===
Year	Title	Role	Notes
2004	Wilderness Survival for Girls	Deborah	
2006	The Lost	Sally Richmond	
2007	I Know Who Killed Me	Anya	
2010	Jelly	Receptionist	
2011	Brawler	Chloe	

=== Television ===
Year	Title	Role	Notes
2000	Judging Amy	Teresa Riley	Episode: "Dog Days"
2001	The Practice	Meredith Danzer	Episode: "Home of the Brave"
2001	NYPD Blue	Frances Pearson	Episode: "Cops and Robber"
2002	Boomtown	Emily	Episode: "The David McNorris Show"
2003	The Brotherhood of Poland, New Hampshire	Monica Shaw	Main role
2004	Without a Trace	Allison Toland	Episode: "Shadows"
2004	Crossing Jordan	Waitress	Episode: "All the News Fit to Print"
2004	Joan of Arcadia	Mari Darlene Fitch	Episode: "The Election"
2004–2005	7th Heaven	Meredith Davies	Recurring role (season 9), main role (season 10)
2005	ER	Katie Milner	Episode: "The Providers"
2005	Medical Investigation	Nancy Hain	Episode: "Survivor"
2005	Veronica Mars	Sabrina Fuller	Episode: "Kanes and Abel's"
2008–2009	Mad Men	Judy Hofstadt	Episodes: "The Inheritance", "Love Among the Ruins" & "The Arrangements"
2009	Grey's Anatomy	Karen "Willow" Zelman	"No Good at Saying Sorry (One More Chance)"
2009	Flower Girl	Bride #2	TV movie
2010	Ghost Whisperer	Lane Dokes	Episode: "Living Nightmares"
2010	Private Practice	Lauren Woods	Episode: "Love Bites"
2011	Yesterday Was a Lie	Student	Episode: "Coniunctio"
2012	Vegas	Tracy	Episode: "(Il) Legitmate"
2013	Grimm	Molly Fisk	Episode: "Mr. Sandman"

== Theater ==
Henning starred in James Kerwin's adaptations of Shakespeare's Venus and Adonis and Cardenio.
