= Burgundy (film) =

2026 documentary film

- Directed by: Michael Dweck; Gregory Kershaw
- Produced by: Michael Dweck; Gregory Kershaw; Cameron O'Reilly
- Cinematography: Michael Dweck; Gregory Kershaw
- Edited by: Pauline Gaillard
- Production companies: Beautiful Stories; Bayard Productions; Faliro House Productions; Artemis Rising Foundation
- Release date: September 3, 2026 (Venice)
- Running time: 90 minutes
- Countries: United States; France
- Language: English

Burgundy is a 2026 documentary film directed and produced by Michael Dweck and Gregory Kershaw. A co-production between United States and France, it explores Burgundy in France, following the traditions, codes, and people.

The film had its world premiere out of competition of the 83rd Venice International Film Festival on September 3, 2026.

== Premise ==
The film explores the region of Burgundy in France, following, traditions, codes, and people, and seductive wine culture.

== Release ==
It had its world premiere out of competition of the 83rd Venice International Film Festival on September 3, 2026. It will also screen at the 53rd Telluride Film Festival on September 5, 2026, Deauville American Film Festival on September 12, 2026. and the Zurich Film Festival.
