= Omar Wasow =

American academic and entrepreneur

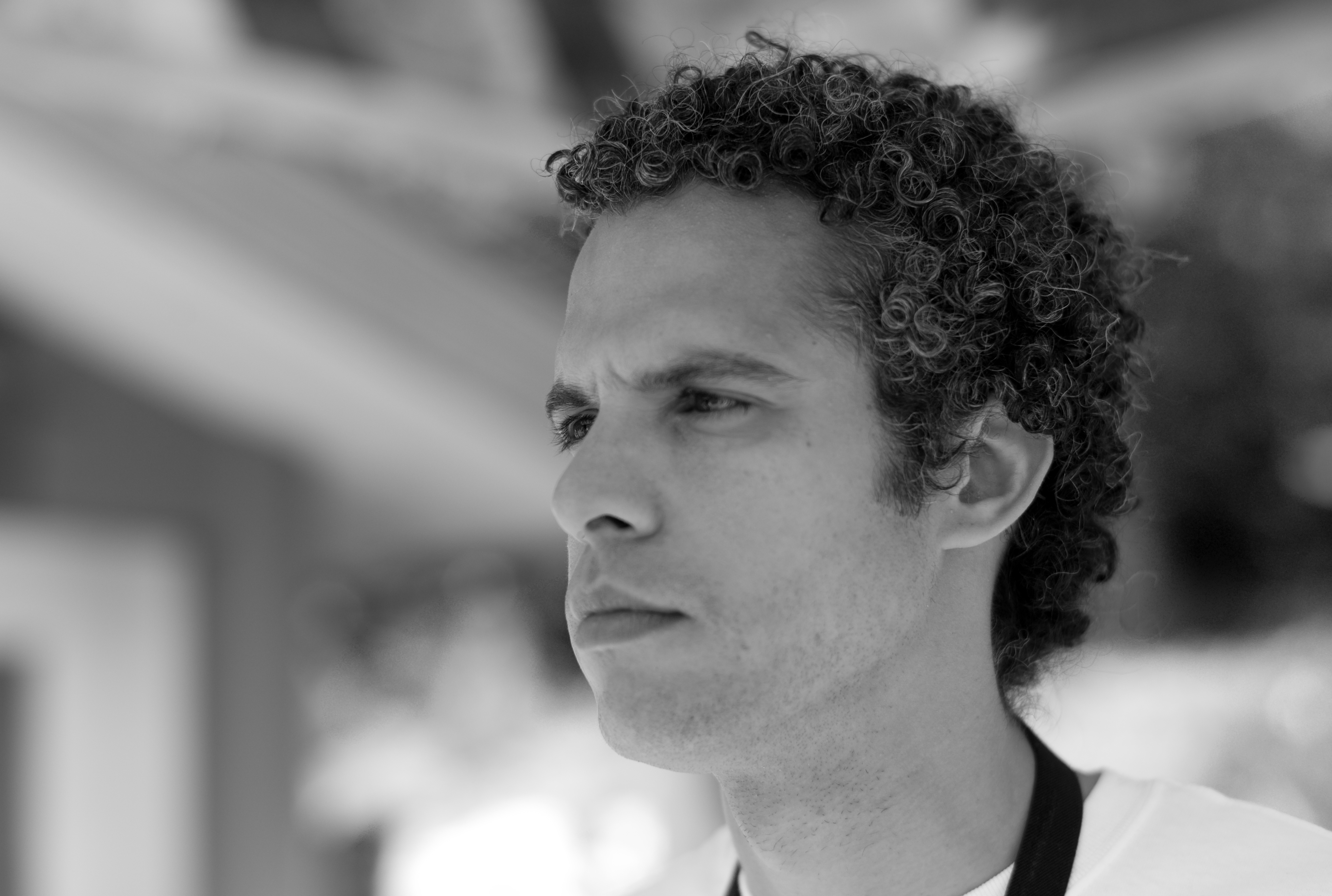
- Wasow in 2007
- Born: Omar Tomas Wasow; 1970 (age 55–56); Nairobi, Kenya
- Education: Stanford University; Harvard University
- Occupations: Tech expert 1995-2008; University professor and researcher, 2009 -
- Employers: Princeton University; Pomona College; University of California, Berkeley
- Known for: Political science, race and ethnic politics
- Spouse: Jennifer Brea (m. 2012)
- Website: www.omarwasow.com

Omar Tomas Wasow (born December 22, 1970) is an assistant professor in UC Berkeley’s Department of Political Science. He is the founder of the social networking website BlackPlanet.

== Life ==
Wasow grew up in a multi-ethnic family. His father, Bernard, is of German Jewish heritage, and his mother, Eileen, is African-American. Bernard was a civil rights activist who participated in the Freedom Summer Project, which entailed registering Black voters in Mississippi. Wasow's paternal grandfather was the mathematician Wolfgang R. Wasow. Both Wolfgang Wasow and Omar Wasow's paternal grandmother are of German Jewish heritage.

== Education ==
Wasow is a graduate of Stuyvesant High School in New York City, where he was president of the student union. He then graduated in 1992 from Stanford University in California with a BA degree in race and ethnic relations.

Wasow earned a PhD in African-American studies, an MA in government and an MA in statistics, all from Harvard University in 2012.

== Tech career ==
In 1995, Wasow was proclaimed by Newsweek as one of the "fifty most influential people to watch in cyberspace."

In 1999 he created BlackPlanet, one of the first major social networking sites. In 2008, the company was sold for $38 million.

== Academic career ==
Wasow became an assistant professor of Politics at Princeton University in 2013.

Wasow’s work centers on race and ethnic politics and social movements and protests. His paper was published four days before the murder of George Floyd, in American Political Science Review paper on violent and nonviolent civil rights protests in the 1960s. The paper was widely discussed in international media coverage of the George Floyd protests.

Altmetric ranked the paper in the top 1% (1,000 of 18 million papers). Controversy erupted after David Shor was fired from his job at Civis Analytics, a progressive data analytics company, for tweeting a summary of Wasow’s paper.

Wasow has written commentary on the George Floyd protests and the 2021 United States Capitol attack.

In Summer 2021, Wasow became an assistant professor of Politics at Pomona College in Claremont, California. In 2022, he left Pomona College to become an assistant professor in UC Berkeley’s Department of Political Science.

== Personal life ==
In 2012, Wasow married Jennifer Brea, a documentary filmmaker he met while they were both Ph.D. students at Harvard. He appears in her documentary film Unrest about her experience living with myalgic encephalomyelitis which premiered at the 2017 Sundance Film Festival.

Wasow's sister is the filmmaker Althea Wasow, married to the writer Paul Beatty.
