= Long Night's Journey into Day =

2000 documentary film by Deborah Hoffman and Frances Reid

Long Night's Journey Into Day
- Directed by: Deborah Hoffmann; Frances Reid
- Produced by: Frances Reid; Johnny Symons
- Cinematography: Ezra Jwili; Frances Reid
- Edited by: Deborah Hoffmann; Kim Roberts
- Music by: Lebo M
- Distributed by: Seventh Art Releasing
- Release dates: January 29, 2000 (Sundance); March 29, 2000
- Running time: 94 minutes
- Country: United States
- Languages: English; Afrikaans

Long Night's Journey Into Day is a 2000 American documentary film about the Truth and Reconciliation Commission in post-Apartheid South Africa. It was nominated for an Academy Award for Best Documentary Feature.

== Reception ==
=== Critical response ===
Long Night's Journey Into Day has an approval rating of 94% on review aggregator website Rotten Tomatoes, based on 16 reviews, and an average rating of 7.48/10. It also has a score of 85 out of 100 on Metacritic, based on 4 critics, indicating "universal acclaim".

=== Awards ===
The film won the Best International Feature Documentary award at the 2000 Hot Docs Canadian International Documentary Festival.

Awards
Preceded by American Movie	Sundance Grand Jury Prize: Documentary; 2000	Succeeded by Southern Comfort
