= Unrest (2017 film) =

2017 American documentary film by Jennifer Brea

- Theatrical release poster
- Directed by: Jennifer Brea
- Written by: Jennifer Brea; Kim Roberts
- Produced by: Jennifer Brea; Lindsey Dryden; Patricia E. Gillespie; Alysa Nahmias; Deborah Hoffmann
- Cinematography: Sam Heesen; Christian Laursen
- Edited by: Kim Roberts; Emiliano Battista
- Music by: Bear McCreary
- Production companies: Shella Films; Little By Little Films; Impact Partners; Chicken & Egg Pictures
- Distributed by: Shella Films; Netflix; Independent Lens
- Release date: January 20, 2017 (Sundance)
- Running time: 97 minutes
- Country: USA

Unrest is a 2017 documentary film produced and directed by Jennifer Brea. The film tells the story of how Jennifer and her new husband faced an illness that struck Jennifer just before they married. Initially dismissed by doctors, she starts filming herself to document her illness and connects with others who are home- or bedbound with myalgic encephalomyelitis/chronic fatigue syndrome (ME/CFS).

The documentary was produced over a four-year period, in which Brea was mostly bedbound. The documentary shows Brea's route to diagnosis and the world of other people homebound with the illness. Unrest was shortlisted for the Academy Award for Best Documentary Feature Film, and won several film festival awards, including the jury award for editing at the Sundance Film Festival.

== Synopsis ==
The documentary follows Jennifer Brea, who was a PhD student at Harvard before she fell ill at age 28. Brea gets progressively more ill and is initially disbelieved by doctors, who attribute her symptoms to stress. She starts a video diary to demonstrate the severity of her illness to her doctors, which later grew into the Unrest documentary. The initial shot shows Brea crawling on the floor, unable to walk. She finally receives a diagnosis of myalgic encephalomyelitis/chronic fatigue syndrome (ME/CFS).

Online, she and her husband Omar Wasow search for answers and she connects with others with the illness. A woman in the US is left by her husband, who believed the illness is psychological. They reconcile only after their daughter develops ME, convincing him of the illness's reality. In Denmark, a girl is taken by police into a psychiatric hospital against her will, as authorities believed her parents were nurturing her illness. The son of geneticist Ron Davis is shown, who at that point had been unable to speak for a year due to the illness. Elsewhere, a young woman in the UK has developed osteoporosis, as she has been unable to leave her bed for years.

The film is interspersed with interviews with scientists and immunologists, who talk about the limited research funding available for the disease. They attribute this to the difficult-to-understand nature of symptoms and to the fact that most people with ME are women. The documentary finally depicts the 2016 #MillionsMissing protests, which advocated for increased awareness and support for ME patients globally.

== Production ==
The production of Unrest began when Brea picked up the camera to film her symptoms because she was being dismissed by doctors in the spring of 2012. Initially, she had wanted to possibly write a book using her videos as a source, but when she noticed doctors started believing her after seeing her recordings, she decided that the story would be better told visually.

The whole production process took four years. Brea spent the first year working out "how to make a film from bed" and raising money, then 1.5 years filming, and spent the remaining time editing. Brea used a Skype teleprompter to conduct interviews, and eventually found a way to stream an on-set camera to her computer. Gradually, she built a global team. She was bedridden throughout much of the production of the film, conducting interviews on Skype and directing remotely with producers and crews around the world. The film also contains self-filmed home videos.

Unrest, initially named Canary in a Coal Mine, got its first round of funding from a 2013 Kickstarter campaign. Further funding came from various grants and fellowships. Impact Partners invested in the documentary during post-production. The overall production budget reached high six-figures over four years and was financed by a mix of crowdfunding and grants (70%), equity (20%), with 10% unaccounted for when the documentary was released.

== Release ==
The film received one of the two inaugural Creative Distribution Fellowships of the Sundance Institute. This allowed Brea more freedom around marketing and the distribution of the documentary, rather than having to sell the rights away.

The film premiered at the 2017 Sundance Film Festival on January 20. To enable people homebound with ME/CFS to participate, the premiere included 25 virtual seats. It was screened during the 2017 SXSW Film Festival in March; The Melbourne International Film Festival and the New Zealand International Film Festival in August 2017; Sheffield Doc Fest; CPH:Dox; and Hotdocs. In fall of 2017, the film opened theatrically in the United States and United Kingdom.

Unrest aired in the United States as part of the Independent Lens series on the Public Broadcasting Service in January 2018. It became available on Netflix on January 15, 2018, and available for free on YouTube in May 2023. Unrest VR, inspired by the documentary, was released at the Tribeca Film Festival. It asked participants to lie down on a bed and explore life with a chronic illness using a VR headset.

== Reception and impact ==
The film was well-received. Unrest was shortlisted for the Academy Award for best documentary feature, but was not one of the final five nominations. It was nominated for a News & Documentary Emmy for Outstanding Editing, won the Special Jury Award for Editing at the 2017 Sundance Film Festival, and the 2017 Sheffield Doc/Fest Illuminate Award. It furthermore won an award for the best documentary feature at the RiverRun International Film Festival and the Nashville Film Festival. It won the Cinema Eye Honors award in the category "The Unforgettables".

Critics in particular praised the intimacy of the documentary. The Los Angeles Times called the film "an existential exploration of the meaning of life while battling a crippling chronic illness." The film was described as an engaging watch, despite being filmed mostly in the bedrooms of the featured ME patients. The home footage highlighted the authenticity of the strain ME put on Brae and her husband's marriage, as well as the resilience they showed in overcoming these strains.

The advocacy in the documentary was considered effective. Glenn Kenny, writing for RogerEbert.com, describes Brea as "relentless" in documenting the severity of her symptoms, which includes periods of paralysis and hypersensitivity to light. The Los Angeles Times called the film "a stirring call to action". While Unrest does not propose a direct solution for people with ME/CFS, it does showcase hope in the #MillionsMissing protests, which sought greater recognition for the illness.

The documentary was accompanied by a large awareness campaign and reached a wide audience. It may have contributed to boosts in research funding in Canada, the UK, the US and in particular Australia. It gave a boost to the growth of the #MEAction network, and the #MillionsMissing protests. The documentary became accredited for Continuing Medical Education (CME) in the US.
