= What We Left Unfinished =

2019 film by Mariam Ghani

- Theatrical release poster
- Directed by: Mariam Ghani
- Written by: Mariam Ghani
- Produced by: Mariam Ghani
- Cinematography: Adam Hogan
- Edited by: Ian Olds
- Music by: Qasim Naqvi
- Production companies: Indexical Films; Ajna Films
- Distributed by: Dekanalog (United States)
- Release date: 9 February 2019 (Berlin International Film Festival)
- Running time: 71 minutes
- Countries: United States; Afghanistan; Qatar

What We Left Unfinished is a 2019 Afghan documentary film by Mariam Ghani about five incomplete Afghan films, all started during the Communist regime of Afghanistan. The film premiered at the Berlin International Film Festival in February 2019.

== Background and synopsis ==
During the rule of the Democratic Republic of Afghanistan, the government invested heavily in the film industry, sponsoring many films. Filmmakers were provided with military support too, often using live ammunition and real soldiers on the sets. These films thus also served as propaganda for the regime.

The documentary is a culmination of Ghani's six years of research at Afghanistan's National Film Archive in Kabul. Ghani worked to digitise films from the archive and organised multiple screenings of these at museums and universities around the world. At one such screening, filmmaker Latif Ahmadi learned that the footage of the April 1978 coup in Afghanistan (the Saur Revolution) was from his 1984 film Escape. He then confessed to Ghani that the footage was originally part of his unfinished 1978 film, The April Revolution, commissioned by then Afghan vice-chairman Hafizullah Amin to commemorate his role in the revolution. However, before the film could be completed the country was invaded by the Soviet Union in December 1979, leading to Amin's government being overthrown. Ghani then began to search for the incomplete film and discovered four other films which were forced to be abandoned due to political reasons between 1978 and 1992.

The documentary consists of clips from the films, accompanied by interviews of the directors, the cast and some crew members. Ghani intended the documentary to raise awareness about the Communist regime in the country. She stated that the films only reflected the lives of a small group of elites, who referred to themselves as the "enlightened people". The Communists are often depicted as "revolutionaries" in these films.

== Films featured ==
The films featured in the documentary include:

- The April Revolution (1978)
- Soqot (transl. Downfall) (1987) by Faqir Nabi
- Almas-e Siah (transl. The Black Diamond) (1989) by Khalek Halil
- Wrong Way (1990)
- Agent (1991)

== Release ==
The film premiered at the Berlin International Film Festival on 9 February 2019 and also featured at the San Francisco International Film Festival in April 2019. It then featured at the Sheffield Doc/Fest in June 2019 and was nominated for the New Talent award.

In 2021, it was announced that film distributor Dekanalog had obtained the rights for the theatrical release of the film in the United States.
