= Mariam Ghani =

American artist (born 1978)

- مریم غنی
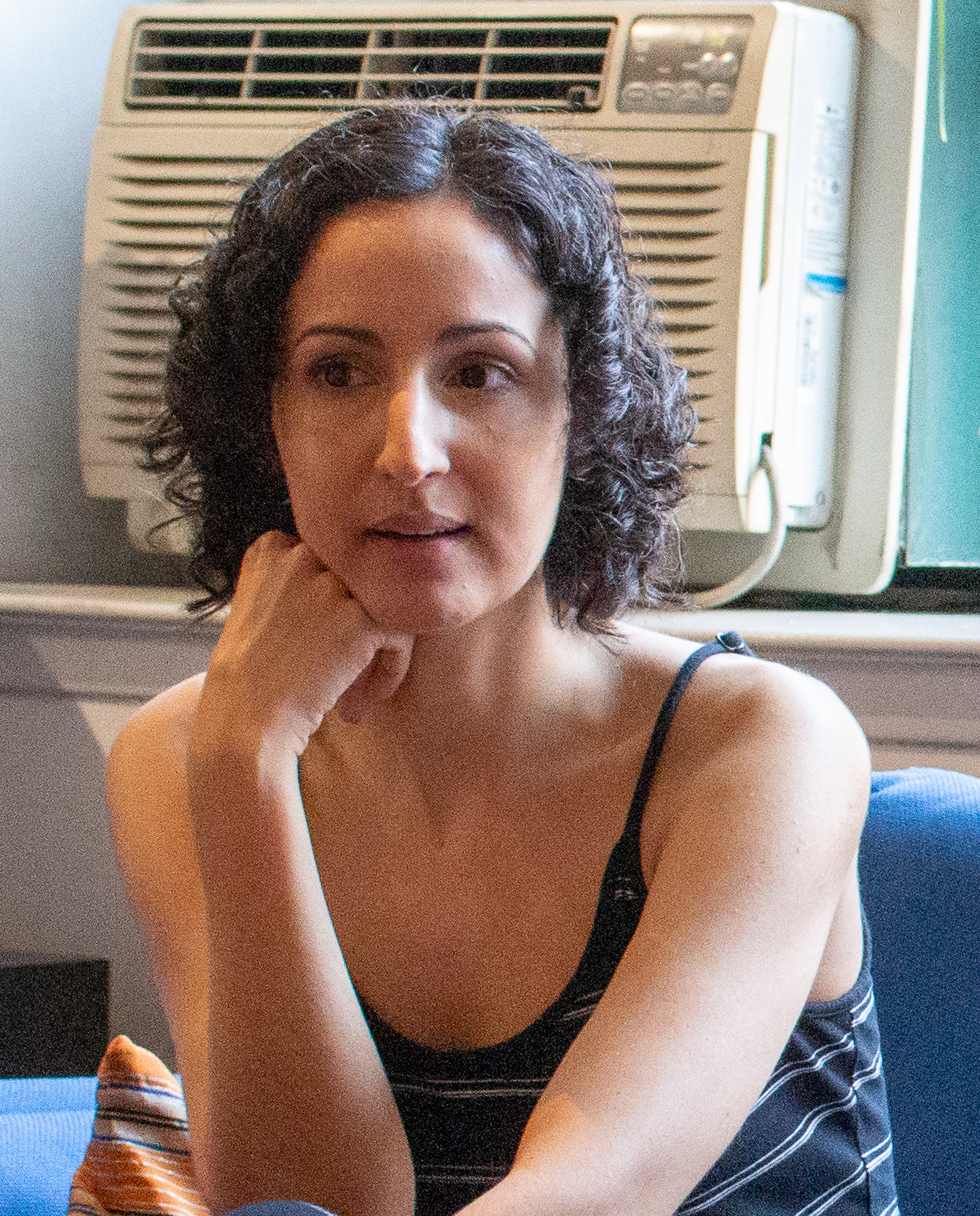
- Ghani in 2019
- Born: 1978 (age 47–48); New York City, U.S.
- Occupations: Visual artist, photographer, filmmaker, social activist
- Years active: 2000–present
- Parent(s): Ashraf Ghani; Rula Saade

Mariam Ghani (Pashto/Dari: مریم غنی; born 1978) is an American visual artist, photographer, filmmaker and social activist. A member of the Visual Arts faculty at Bennington College, Ghani is the collaborator and partner of Chitra Ganesh and is represented by Ryan Lee Gallery. Her work has been featured in venues like the Tate Modern and the National Gallery of Art, and she has produced several projects including Index of the Disappeared as well as films like Like Water From a Stone and What We Left Unfinished.

== Early life and education ==
Mariam Ghani was born in 1978 in Brooklyn, New York to an Afghan father and a Lebanese mother. Her father, Mohammad Ashraf Ghani, served as the president of Afghanistan from 2014 to 2021. Her mother, Rula Saade, is a Lebanese citizen. Living in the suburbs of Maryland, Ghani grew up in exile and was unable to travel to Afghanistan until 2002 when she was age 24.

In 2000, Ghani graduated from New York University with an undergraduate degree in comparative literature. She then earned a Master of Fine Arts in video photography and installation art from the School of Visual Arts in 2002.

== Work ==
Ghani sees her use of digital media and technology as a toolkit for creating her art. Much of her work has a political component and speaks to systemic inequality in social and economic systems, and she considers herself both a women's rights and human rights activist. She has presented her exhibits at the Transmediale (2003), in Liverpool (2004), at EMAP Seoul (2005), at the Tate Modern (2007), at the National Gallery of Art (2008), in Beijing (2009), and in Sharjah (2009, 2011). From 2004–2005, she was an Eyebeam resident. Since 2018, Ghani has been a member of the Visual Arts Faculty at Bennington College.

Since 2004, Ghani has been working on a multimedia project entitled Index of the Disappeared, with her long-time collaborator and partner Chitra Ganesh. It serves as a record of the United States' post-9/11 detention of immigrants and the American public's subsequent reaction to it. The project has grown and evolved over time, leading to a short film titled How Do You See the Disappeared? as well as a web project. Other materials include transcripts, scraps of video, and radio clips.

Additionally, Ghani has made multiple film projects. In 2013, she made Like Water From a Stone, a project Ghani filmed in Stavanger, Norway about the transformation the country underwent with the discovery of oil in 1969. In 2016, she made The City & the City, a short film produced in St. Louis, Missouri looking at the social upheaval resulting from institutionalized inequity in the United States. Other films, like The Trespassers, shown at the Los Angeles Municipal Art Gallery in 2014, seek to examine the problems inherent in translating languages.

In addition to her visual art works, Ghani works as a journalist, specifically writing and lecturing on issues affecting the Afghan diaspora. Additionally, she is a member of the Gulf Labor Working Group, an advocacy group for workers building museums in Abu Dhabi. She is also an archivist who has worked to digitize and re-image works produced by Afghan state filmmakers from 1978–1991 during the country's Communist period. Ghani's feature-length film What We Left Unfinished is a documentary of these incomplete Afghan films; in a 2021 interview with Art Forum, Ghani described the film as a reflection on Afghanistan's unsettled Communist period which bore unfinished artworks and unfinished political movements. Additionally, she commented that Radio Television Afghanistan has an "amazingly rich archive of audiovisual material deserving of wider attention."
