= Johnny Symons =

Johnny Symons is a documentary filmmaker focusing on LGBT cultural and political issues. He is a professor in the Cinema Department at San Francisco State University, where he runs the documentary program and is the director and co-founder of the Queer Cinema Project. He received his BA from Brown University and his MA in documentary production from Stanford University. He has served as a Fellow in the Sundance Institute’s Documentary Film Program.

His latest film, Out Run, co-directed with award-winning filmmaker S. Leo Chiang, premiered at the Full Frame Documentary Film Festival and won Best Cinematography for a Feature Length Documentary Film at the Los Angeles Asian Pacific Film Festival. His documentary Daddy & Papa, about the personal, cultural, and political impact of gay men raising children, premiered at the Sundance Film Festival, broadcast on PBS’s Independent Lens, and was nominated for a national Emmy for Best Documentary. Ask Not, his award-winning feature-length documentary about the impact of the "don't ask, don't tell" policy in the US military, also aired on Independent Lens. Beyond Conception, a feature documentary about the relationship between a lesbian surrogate and a gay male couple, broadcast on Discovery Channel. Symons was co-producer of Long Night's Journey Into Day, which won the Grand Jury Prize for Best Documentary at the Sundance Film Festival and was nominated for an Academy Award for Best Feature Documentary.

== Filmography ==
- Out in Africa (1994)
- Shaving the Castro (1995)
- Beauty Before Age (1997)
- Daddy & Papa (2002)
- Beyond Conception (2006)
- Ask Not (2008)
- Out Run (2016)
- Assembly (2025, with Rashaad Newsome)

== Awards ==
- Presidential Award, San Francisco State University, 2017
- Best Cinematography Award, Los Angeles Asian Pacific Film Festival, 2016 - Out Run
- Artist-in-Residence, Yerba Buena Center for the Arts, 2015-2016
- Groundbreaker Award for Commitment to LGBTQ Family Equality, Our Family Coalition, 2011
- BEST DOCUMENTARY, GLAAD Media Award, 2009 - Ask Not
- Selector’s Choice Award, Melbourne Queer Film Festival, 2009 - Ask Not
- GOLDEN GATE AWARD, Best First Person Documentary, San Francisco International Film Festival, 2002 - Daddy & Papa
- AUDIENCE AWARD FOR BEST DOCUMENTARY, Florida Film Festival, 2002 - Daddy & Papa
- BEST DOCUMENTARY, Miami Gay and Lesbian Film Festival, 2002 - Daddy & Papa
- Certificate of Merit, International Documentary Association, 1998 - Beauty Before Age
