= The Truffle Hunters =

2020 documentary film directed by Michael Dweck and Gregory Kershaw

- Theatrical release poster illustrated by Michael Koelsch
- Directed by: Michael Dweck; Gregory Kershaw
- Produced by: Michael Dweck; Gregory Kershaw
- Cinematography: Michael Dweck; Gregory Kershaw
- Edited by: Charlotte Munch Bengtsen
- Music by: Ed Côrtes
- Production companies: Faliro House Productions; Frenesy Film Company; Park Pictures; Bow and Arrow Entertainment; Artemis Rising Foundation; Beautiful Stories
- Distributed by: Sony Pictures Classics
- Release dates: January 30, 2020 (Sundance); March 5, 2021 (United States)
- Running time: 84 minutes
- Countries: United States; Greece; Italy
- Languages: Italian; Piedmontese
- Box office: $983,290

The Truffle Hunters is a 2020 documentary film directed and produced by Michael Dweck and Gregory Kershaw that follows a group of aging men and their dogs as they hunt in the woods for a prized quarry—the Alba truffle. Luca Guadagnino, under his Frenesy Film Company banner, is one of the film's many executive producers. The film had its world premiere at the Sundance Film Festival on January 30, 2020, and was released in theaters on March 5, 2021, by Sony Pictures Classics. It received positive reviews from film critics.

== Synopsis ==
A group of aging men and their dogs hunt in the woods in Northern Italy for a prized quarry—the Alba truffle.

== Release ==
The film had its world premiere at the Sundance Film Festival on January 30, 2020. Shortly thereafter, Sony Pictures Classics acquired distribution rights to the film for $1.5 million. It was set to screen at the Cannes Film Festival and the Telluride Film Festival prior to their cancellations due to the COVID-19 pandemic, and it did screen at the Toronto International Film Festival and the New York Film Festival, on September 18 and on October 5, 2020, respectively. Dweck and Kershaw had conversations about the film at a number of film festivals.

Sony released the film in the United States on March 5, 2021; it had previously been scheduled to be released on December 25, 2020 and March 12, 2021. BBC Four's Storyville broadcast The Truffle Hunters in the U.K.

== Reception ==
On the review aggregator website Rotten Tomatoes, 97% of 128 critics' reviews of the film are positive, with an average score of 8.2/10; the site's "critics consensus" reads: "The Truffle Hunters explores a world most viewers will know nothing about – with delightfully savory results." On Metacritic, the film has a weighted average score of 85 out of 100 based on reviews by 24 critics, indicating "universal acclaim".
