= The Last Race (2018 film) =

American documentary film

- Directed by: Michael Dweck
- Written by: Michael Dweck, Gregory Kershaw
- Produced by: Michael Dweck, Gregory Kershaw
- Cinematography: Gregory Kershaw
- Distributed by: Magnolia Pictures
- Release date: November 16, 2018 (2018 Sundance Film Festival)
- Country: United States
- Language: English

The Last Race is a 2018 documentary film directed by Michael Dweck about stock car racing at Riverhead Raceway on Long Island, New York.

== Release ==
The Last Race had its world premiere at the 2018 Sundance Film Festival in the US Documentary Competition.

== Reception ==
As of 2 March 2025, the film has a 93% rating on Rotten Tomatoes.
