= Deborah Hoffmann =

American documentary director and editor (born 1947)

- Born: October 17, 1947
- Occupation(s): Director, film editor

Deborah Hoffmann is an American documentary director and editor. She edited and along with Frances Reid co-directed Long Night's Journey into Day (2000), which won the 2000 Sundance Film Festival Grand Jury award for best documentary and was nominated for the Academy Award for Best Documentary Feature. She also directed the Academy Award-nominated short film, Complaints of a Dutiful Daughter (1995) and was the editor of The Times of Harvey Milk, which won the 1984 Oscar for best documentary.

== Selected filmography ==
- The Times of Harvey Milk (1984) – editor
- Ethnic Notions (1987) – editor
- Color Adjustment (1992) – editor
- Complaints of a Dutiful Daughter (1995) – director
- Long Night's Journey into Day (2000) – co-director and editor
- The Kill Team (2013) – executive producer
- Unrest (2017) – executive producer
