= Lindsey Dryden =

British film director, producer and writer

Lindsey Dryden is a British, Emmy Award-winning film producer, director and writer. She is best known for writing and directing films including The Callers (2025) as part of the Queer Futures collection, and Jackie Kay: One Person, Two Names (2017) for Tate's Queer British Art, and producing Trans In America (2019) and Unrest (2017). She was a consultant on the AppleTV+ documentary Deaf President Now! (2025) directed by Nyle DiMarco and Davis Guggenheim, and consulting producer on the Netflix series Heart of Invictus (2023).

== Early life ==
Dryden was born in Gloucestershire, England, and grew up in Wales. She learned to play piano as a child from her father. She studied at Goldsmiths, University of London, and was awarded a Bachelor of Arts with First Class honours. Dryden has been mentored by the National Film & Television School, Weekend director Andrew Haigh, and BAFTA x BFI Flare.

== Career ==
Dryden began her career working on television documentaries for the BBC, Channel 4, The History Channel, Current TV and others, before moving into independent film.

Dryden has directed and produced films that have screened at numerous top international festivals, including SXSW, Sundance, Tribeca, True/False, Sheffield Doc/Fest, HotDocs, New York's Lincoln Center and the British Film Institute. Her work has been released theatrically in the UK and US, exhibited at Tate Modern and Tate Britain, streamed on Vogue.com, featured in Elle (magazine), and broadcast on Netflix, PBS, BBC and Channel 4.

Her directing credits include feature documentary Lost and Sound (SXSW, 2012), short documentary Close Your Eyes And Look At Me (True/False, 2009) and Jackie Kay: One Person Two Names, commissioned for Tate Britain's Queer British Art 2017.

For directing Lost and Sound she was nominated Best New UK Filmmaker at Open City Docs and Best Female-Directed Film at Sheffield Doc/Fest. The film went on to screen and win awards at festivals globally, including at ReelAbilities and Napa Valley Film Festival.

Dryden produced SXSW-debuting documentary series Trans In America. One of those short films, Trans In America: Texas Strong, won the Emmy for Outstanding Short Documentary on 24 September 2019 as well as a Webby Award and a Webby People's Voice Award in May 2019.

Dryden produced Sundance award-winning feature documentary Unrest (dir: Jennifer Brea), which premiered in competition at the 2017 Sundance Film Festival, won a Sundance Special Jury Award, won a 2018 Independent Lens Audience Award, and was shortlisted for the Academy Award for Best Documentary Feature at the 2017 Oscars.

Her other producing credits include short documentary Little Ones (dir: Joanna Coates, 2013), and a verite documentary series with the ACLU about transgender civil rights (2018). She co-produced Sheffield Doc/Fest VR award-winning Unrest VR (2017), with Jennifer Brea, Arnaud Colinart and Amaury La Burthe, and in 2013 was nominated Best Producer at Underwire, a festival celebrating female filmmakers, for Little Ones. The film was developed as part of the London Borough Film Fund Challenge.

Dryden is a founding member of Queer Producers Collective, a co-founder of FWD-Doc: Filmmakers with Disabilities, the 2025 SXSW Janet Pierson Champion Award winner, a 2024 Concordia Fellow, a 2022 Sundance Documentary Producers Lab Fellow, the 2019 Simon Relph Memorial Bursary awardee, a recent Filmmaker-In-Residence at Jacob Burns Film Center in New York, and an artist-in-residence at Somerset House Studios. She frequently consults, mentors, speaks on panels and offers masterclasses, including for BAFTA, SXSW, Ffilm Cymru Wales, Channel 4, Doc Society and Women In Film & Television.

== Filmography ==
- Trans In America (producer) – documentary series (2018)
- Jackie Kay: One Person, Two Names (director) – documentary short (2017) – Tate Queer British Art 2017
- Unrest (producer) – documentary feature (2017) – 2017 Sundance Film Festival
- Unrest VR (co-producer) – virtual reality experience (2017) – 2017 Tribeca Film Festival
- Tate Shots: Georgia O’Keeffe directed by Petra Collins (executive producer) – short (2018) – Vogue.com
- Tate Shots: Harun Farocki (director/producer) – documentary short (2016) – Tate Modern
- Tate Shots: Yinka Shonibare (director/producer) – documentary short (2016) – Tate Modern
- Tate Shots: Agnes Martin (director/producer) – documentary short (2016) – Tate Modern
- Tate Shots: Parviz Tanavoli (director/producer) – documentary short (2016) – Tate Modern
- Alexis Hunter: Approach To Fear (director/producer) – documentary short (2014)
- Little Ones (producer) – documentary short - 2013 Underwire Film Festival
- Lost and Sound (director/producer) – feature documentary (2012) - South By Southwest Film Festival - Winner, Special Jury Award, DORF Music Film Festival, Croatia
- RSC: Much Ado About Nothing (director/producer) - documentary short (2012) - BBC/The Space/Royal Shakespeare Company
- Making Sense of My Senses (director/producer) – documentary short (2011) - Community Channel
- TRIBES (Royal Court Theatre) (director/producer) - d/Deaf-accessible shorts (2010) - Royal Court Theatre
- Close Your Eyes and Look at Me (director/producer) – documentary short - 2009 True/False Film Festival
