= Michael Dweck =

American visual artist and filmmaker

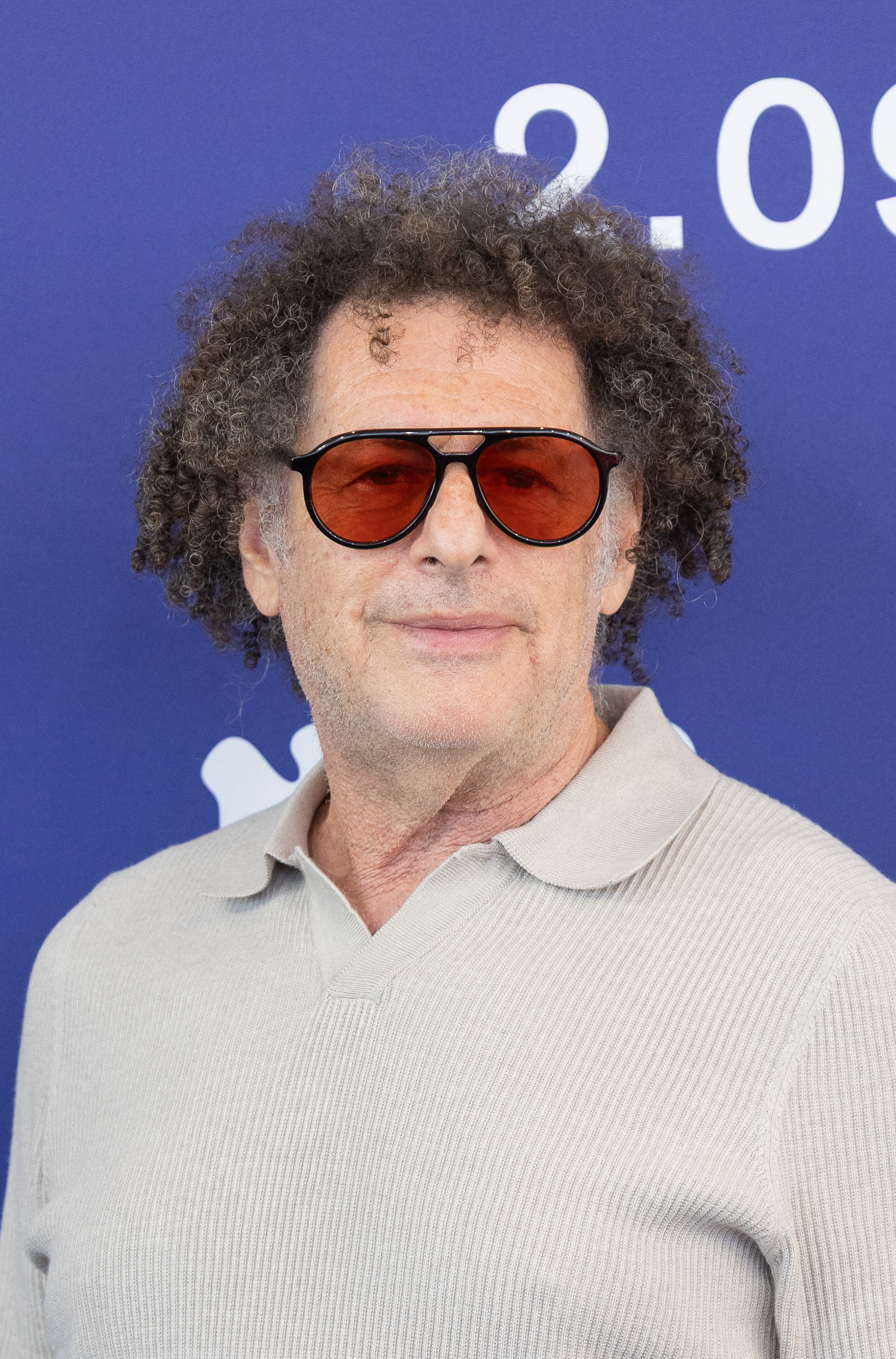
- Dweck in 2026
- Born: September 26, 1957 (age 69); Brooklyn, New York, U.S.
- Known for: Fine art photography, filmmaking
- Website: michaeldweck.com

Michael Dweck (born September 26, 1957) is an American visual artist and filmmaker. Best known for his narrative photography, Dweck's work "explores ongoing struggles between identity and adaptation in endangered societal enclaves." In 2003, he became the first living photographer to have a solo exhibition at Sotheby's, and in 2012, he was the first American photographer to exhibit his work in Cuba since the beginning of the United States embargo in 1960. He lives and works in New York City and in Montauk, New York.

Born in 1957 in Brooklyn, Dweck grew up in Bellmore, Long Island, attending John F. Kennedy High School and then Brooklyn's Pratt Institute to study architecture, communication and fine arts. Upon graduation, Dweck founded Michael Dweck & Co., later known as Dweck & Campbell, winning a number of advertising industry awards before closing the firm in 2001 to pursue his artistic interests. Over the next decade, Dweck built a substantial reputation in fine art photography with works including The End: Montauk, N.Y. (2004,) Mermaids (2008,) and Habana Libre (2011.) In recent years Dweck's artwork has branched into other media including sculpture and filmmaking, with his first feature-length film The Last Race premiering at the 2018 Sundance Film Festival in Park City, Utah.

== Early life and education ==
Dweck was born in Brooklyn in 1957 to David and Sydelle Dweck. The family moved to Bellmore, a town on Long Island about 27 miles east of Manhattan, where David worked as accountant. Dweck's father presented him with his first camera on the occasion of the 1964 New York World's Fair.

Dweck graduated from Bellmore's John F. Kennedy High School in 1975. He then attended Pratt Institute in Brooklyn. Initially an architecture student, Dweck switched to communication and fine arts in 1976 at the suggestion of the department, who told him that humor had no place in architecture after he chose to design a house for Colonel Sanders of Kentucky Fried Chicken for a school project. For another project, he designed an AT&T building to resemble a gigantic phone booth. After receiving his bachelor's degree in 1979, he went on to study with artist James Wines and with semiotician Marshall Blonsky at The New School for Social Research.

== Dweck & Campbell ==
While studying at the Pratt Institute, Dweck was exposed to the creative workings of several prominent New York-based advertising agencies, including DDB and Young & Rubicam. Following graduation, seeking to escape the frustration of what he considered to be an uninspirational creative environment, Dweck set out in 1980 to found his own firm, Michael Dweck & Co. In 1992, Lori Campbell joined the firm as a partner to form Dweck & Campbell.

The team quickly earned a reputation for edgy and unconventional work with a mischievous sense of humor. CNN called Dweck a “creative prodigy.” AdWeek's Tim Nudd dubbed him "a master of the absurd." Producer Larry Shanet, who contributed to many of the agency's television commercials and went on to win numerous industry awards, said of Dweck, "He's not a cookie-cutter guy, and he doesn't make cookie-cutter work." Well-known clients included MTV, Swatch, Comedy Central and Dial-a-Mattress.

Dweck & Campbell's second television advertisement, promoting retailer Giant Carpet, depicted George H. W. Bush during the waning days of his administration vandalizing the White House carpets for then-incoming president Bill Clinton. Clinton's communications director George Stephanopoulos telephoned Dweck to complain that he had "stag[ed] the mock killing of a president-elect." Under political pressure, network ABC withdrew the ad, but the agency managed to land five slots on NBC's popular late-night comedy show Saturday Night Live. "We knew we'd hit a home run," Dweck said. Over the next eighteen months, Giant Carpet expanded its operations from four stores to 42.

Still better known was the agency's 1998 television spot for Dial-a-Mattress, which featured a cantankerous man-sized Arctic ground squirrel purchasing a mattress on which to hibernate for the winter. The ad, noted for its comic abrasiveness, was pulled from the airwaves after only 13 days. It then went on to win a Gold Lion award at the Cannes International Advertising Festival, and was selected for inclusion in both the Gale Group's 100 most influential marketing campaigns of the year and Boards magazine's Top 10 Boards awards of 1999.

In April 1999, Lori Campbell left the firm, which was renamed Dweck, Inc., or more simply "Dweck!", with Dweck as chairman and sole creative director. The agency continued to pursue its unorthodox aesthetic sensibilities, and by seventeen months after Campbell's departure had more than doubled its previous year's billings to $50 million. Nearly immediately following the reorganization, Dweck! won the American Association of Advertising Agencies' O'Toole Creative Award for best small agency in the United States. Later in 1999, Dweck!'s spots for Top Driver driving school and UPN won awards from Art Directors Club, Association of Independent Commercial Producers, One Club for Art & Copy and the New York Addys. Bennett Miller, later best known as the Academy Award-winning director of Capote, helped create Dweck!'s spots for Top Driver, in which hidden cameras recorded conversations between instructors and students. These spots were recognized as the Best Low-Budget Campaign by London International Advertising Awards.

In July 2001, Dweck closed the agency and left advertising to concentrate on photography. "I'm a creative," said Dweck, "and I want to get back to working just on creative."

== Photography ==
=== The End: Montauk, N.Y. ===
There are no rules in Montauk. There are no traffic lights, and even the policemen are surfers. Your good looks are your currency in this community.

— Michael Dweck, Esquire UK, June 2004

After closing his advertising agency, in 2002 Dweck began to photograph subjects and scenes around Montauk, focusing on its surfing subculture. Dweck had been visiting Montauk since his second year of high school, beginning when he'd heard that the Rolling Stones were spending time there with Andy Warhol. Instead of finding the Rolling Stones, Dweck and his friends discovered a hidden inlet with a thriving local surfing culture.

Dweck would parlay this collection of art photos into the 2003 solo show at Sotheby's in New York and in 2004 his first book, The End: Montauk, N.Y., published by Harry N. Abrams. The 5,000-print run was sold out in less than three weeks. The brisk sell-out of the book was attributed to its local interest, the beauty of the photography, and the allure of the nude models. Artnet describes The End as a blend of nostalgia, documentary and fantasy, with photos that evoke "the paradise of summer, youth, and erotic possibility, and of community and camaraderie in a perfect setting."

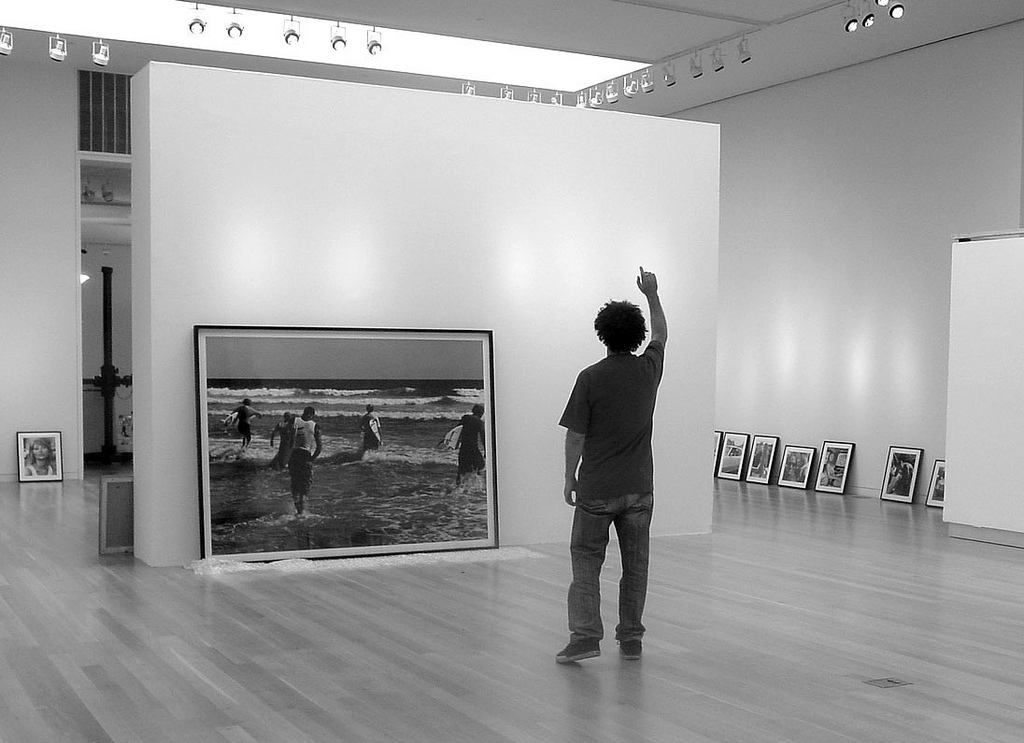
Michael Dweck preparing his Sotheby's installation, New York, September 2003

For decades, Montauk had been undergoing a gradual transformation from a fishing village to a beachside resort. By the 1990s, developers, running out of room in the greater New York region, had begun to focus on the far eastern reaches of Long Island. Writing for Forbes, art critic Patrick Hanlon called The End an "act of preservation," later likening it to "an attempt to freeze time." Hanlon quoted Dweck saying, "I knew Montauk would change, and I wanted to capture the way Montauk made me feel. I didn't want it to be sentimental or nostalgic. I wanted that collection of images to freeze Montauk."

The best known photograph from the book, Sonya, Poles, depicts a naked young woman running across the beach towards the ocean with a surfboard under her arm. Hanlon compared Sonya to "Matisse at the beach.” One print of this photo sold for over $17,000, and then another sold for $30,000. Esquire Magazine dubbed the image "best surfboard" in its monthly cultural round-up.

In March 2010, Dweck filed a copyright infringement lawsuit against a New York-based clothing designer called Malibu Denim, alleging that they'd used Sonya, Poles in their advertisements for designer jeans, even including copies of the photo on the hang tag which accompanied their products. With the jeans selling at $160–200 each, the court awarded Dweck $100,000.

Many of the photos from The End were exhibited at numerous galleries and solo exhibitions in New York, Belgium, San Francisco, Monaco, and the Blitz Gallery in Tokyo, and the Gallery Orchard in Nagoya. Dweck's work was also presented at art fairs in Paris and Bologna.

Dweck worried that his photographs would call more unwanted attention to the quiet culture of Montauk, saying:

"That's the way it always goes, isn't it? Everyone who makes it to the fallout shelter tries to bolt the door behind him. It's like some graffiti I read in the stall at the Shagwong Tavern. 'Welcome to Montauk. Take a picture and get the f--- out.'"

"Here are my pictures. Please, please stay away just a little longer."

A second edition of The End: Montauk, N.Y. was scheduled for release in July 2016 by Ditch Plains Press on a short run with a very limited distribution. It was projected that only 300 copies were to circulate, at a price of $3,000 each, with each copy numbered and signed by Dweck, printed on paper made in Italy's Riva del Garda and "enclosed in a handmade Japanese box." This limited edition is said to include 85 photographs which were not presented in the first edition.

=== Mermaids ===
Dweck's Mermaid 1 at an exhibition at Maruani & Noirhomme Gallery in Brussels in 2008

Dweck's second book Mermaids was released in 2008 by Ditch Plains Press. Its photographs featured female nudes swimming under water, evoking the legend of the mermaid. As art editor Christopher Sweet described them in his introduction to the book, “Whether diving in the blue refractions of a swimming pool or suspended like a seraph in the cool, pellucid depths of a spring or emerging tentatively onto a rocky shore, Michael Dweck's mermaids are lovely and aloof and bare of all raiment but for their beautiful manes and the elemental draperies that surround them. Water, light, and lens converge to capture in modern guise the elusive creature of myth.”

Like his previous book, The End: Montauk, N.Y., Mermaids was inspired by Dweck's experiences interacting with the local environment. While night fishing in the waters off Long Island's south shore, Dweck was captivated by the flashing streaks of light caused by fish swimming beneath him. "The idea was, if I happen to fall overboard one night, what would I see down there? Those flashes of light could be mermaids." Mermaids continued the focus on attractive young people in water settings which characterized The End, but departed from The End's romantic realism to veer into fantasy, with photographs blurring the lines between reality and imagination.

Unlike The End, Mermaids was shot in and through the water, using methods for underwater flash photography developed by Harold Eugene Edgerton. The technology required to house and protect large format cameras was not yet widely available, leading Dweck to design his own cases for the project, using weights and pulleys to manipulate the camera. To obtain the desired angles for the shots, Dweck used two different techniques, diving into the water with his subjects, either with a long snorkel or unaided, and shooting from behind a glass wall placed within the river. As Dweck explained it:

I just started to experiment. I said to myself, "OK, I have light, I have a lens and I have water"

Rather than use professional models, Dweck turned to women with the experience needed to move comfortably and naturally in underwater environments, including friends from his native Long Island's East End as well as residents of the rural fishing village Aripeka, Florida. Shooting took place both locally in Montauk and Amagansett and in the Weeki Wachee River, where some inhabitants of Aripeka, located on a nearby island in the Gulf of Mexico, had been employed to perform at the Weeki Wachee Springs waterpark while costumed as mermaids. According to Christopher Sweet, Dweck met a performer who had been raised in Aripeka and had spent her life in and around water, who then introduced him to other local girls, “some of whom could hold their breath underwater for as long as five or six minutes.”

Photographs from Mermaids were exhibited at galleries in New York, Los Angeles, London, Belgium and Hamburg. Playboy France featured selections in its October 2008 edition under the title "Le Bal des Sirènes." One gelatin silver print from the collection entitled "Mermaid 1" sold at auction in 2009 at Christie's in London for over $17,000, well over initial estimates. In May 2015, Dweck's "Mermaid 18" sold for £27,500 at Phillips London, over double the initial estimate.

For West Palm Beach's Canvas art fair in November 2015, Dweck mounted several murals near the Nicole Henry Fine Art gallery. These murals featured oversized prints of Dweck's mermaids swimming away from the viewer into a black background.

On November 17, 2015, Elin Nordegren held a dinner in Dweck's honor at her beachfront home in North Palm Beach, Florida, with guests including Chris Cline and Laura Norman, both of whom, like Nordegren, are avid collectors of Dweck's work. Dishes prepared by her personal chef were based upon themes drawn from both Mermaids and Dweck's earlier work, The End: Montauk, NY.

=== Habana Libre ===
Dweck standing with "Giselle and Rachel" and "Legs" during an exhibit of Habana Libre at Miami Beach's Art Basel in December 2012

Dweck's third book, Habana Libre ("Free Havana"), was published by Damiani editore and depicted the glamorous lives of what Dweck called Cuba's "privileged creative class." The book includes the first published photographs of and interviews with Alejandro Castro and Camilo Guevara, sons of Cuba's founding revolutionaries Fidel Castro and Che Guevara who are also photographers. Other subjects of the book include musicians Francis de Rio and Kelvis Ochoa, painters René Francisco, Rachel Valdez and Carlos Quintana, dancer Yaday Ponce Toscano and novelist Leonardo Padura.

Upon Dweck's first visit to Havana in 2009, the New York Times' Guy Trebay quotes Dweck recalling, "I expected all the crumbling buildings and used cars, the usual clichés." Instead, on the very first night of his stay, he was invited to a party where he was introduced to a farándula, or social circle, of Cuba's idle elites, the members of which had access to expensive gadgets such as iPhones and regularly held cocktail parties and staged fashion shows.

Writing for Spain's El País, exiled Cuban poet and essayist Antonio José Ponte observed that these children of revolutionaries had departed from the discretion of previous generations, who'd felt obliged to hide their relative wealth in a political environment of egalitarianism and asceticism, and interpreted their surprising willingness to reveal their lifestyles to an American photographer as a reaction against the constraints of Cuba's Communist Party. The Miami New Times's Kyle Munzenrieder commented that "it's hard to tell if [Dweck is] glamorizing the privilege or slyly exposing the hypocrisy of the myth of communist equality". A pictorial titled "Elit Küba" appeared in the Turkish magazine Tempo.

New York's Staley-Wise Gallery opened an exhibit of Dweck's work to date, Habana Libre and The End: Montauk, N.Y., to coincide with the release of the Habana Libre book on December 9, 2011. Dweck drew parallels between elite Havana and Montauk, observing, "Here are two worldly paradises, both built-up in the 50s and preserved since – for better or worse; both populated by insular groups in some kind of isolation, whether it's self or externally imposed; both beset by threats from without and by new hierarchies from within." Dweck's exhibit at Staley-Wise ran through late January 2012.

Dweck at Havana's Fototeca de Cuba museum during his exhibit Habana Libre in February 2012

Starting February 24 and running through March 24, 2012, Habana Libre was exhibited in Havana's Fototeca de Cuba museum, making Dweck the first American contemporary artist to mount a solo exhibition in Cuba since the US embargo on that country began. Expecting around 300 guests, upon his arrival Dweck instead found himself greeted by around 2,000 artists, diplomats and journalists waiting to enter the exhibit. Later that evening, Alex Castro and Camilo Guevara headed upstairs under armed guard to view their own images as Dweck had captured them. Another of Fidel Castro's sons, Alejandro Castro, was to quip, "Thanks for making me famous"

The exhibition showcased photographs from the book rebuilt to a larger scale using an unconventional variety of paper and a printing technique created specifically for the venue. Dweck said, "I've been given the honor of being one of the first living American artists to exhibit in Cuba, I felt I had to present something additional as a show of respect and gratitude. The unique motif is meant to honor the beauty of the island's past, reflect the heat of the people and serves as a reflection of their spirit, their future, their potential." Following the exhibition, Dweck donated all 52 photographs, then valued at around $500,000, to the Fototeca de Cuba.

In late January 2014, selections from Habana Libre were exhibited at Art Palm Beach in West Palm Beach, Florida, with photographer and critic Elin Spring characterizing Dweck's black and white gelatin silver prints as “positively electric.”

From September 2017 to March 2018, Dweck's work from Habana Libre appeared in Cuba IS, a multimedia exhibit exploring life in modern Cuba, at the Annenberg Space for Photography in Century City. Los Angeles. Backed by the Getty Foundation's "Pacific Standard Time: LA/LA" initiative, the exhibit included an original documentary film produced by the Annenberg Foundation which follows Dweck's and four other featured photographers' work in Cuba.

== Surfboard sculptures ==
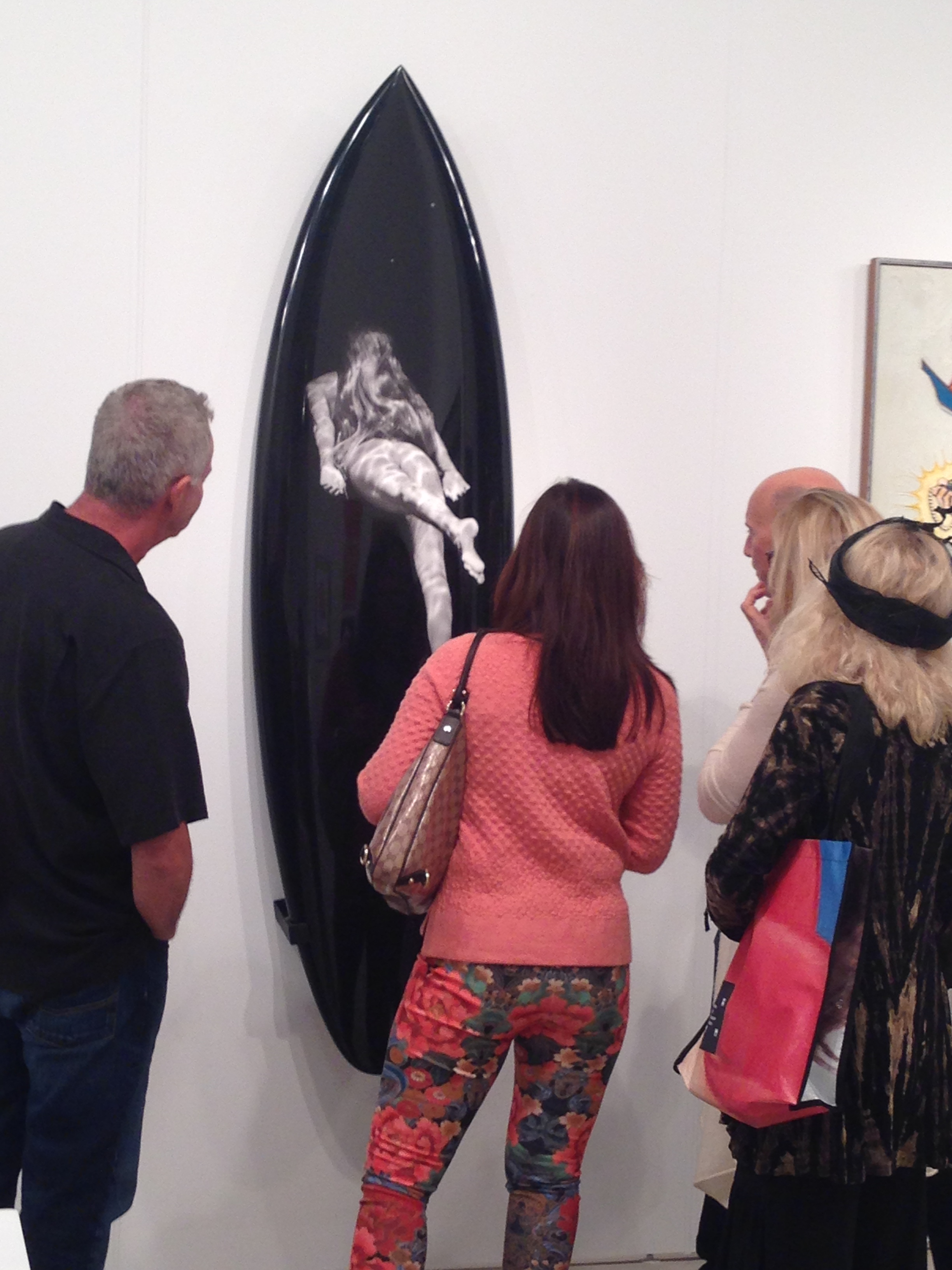
Dweck's surfboard The Duke's Mermaid, named after Duke Kahanamoku, exhibited at Art Basel in Miami Beach

Recently, Dweck has revisited themes from his first two bodies of work, The End and Mermaids, to create customized surfboards emblazoned with black-and-white silhouette images of mermaids. Dweck describes himself as a casual surfer, and the boards are ridable as well as works of art. The surfboards measure six feet and six inches in length and are handcrafted in California, where silk-screen prints of Dweck's photographs are coated with fiberglass and high-gloss resin to create what ArtDaily describes as “beautiful, handmade surfboard-shaped sculptures that seamlessly merge Dweck's subject and medium.” They are named after figures who have influenced Dweck's career, such as Harold "Doc" Edgerton, who developed techniques for underwater flash photography used extensively in Mermaids, and Duke Kahanamoku who is widely credited with popularizing the sport of surfing. ArtDaily quotes Dweck saying of his surfboards:

'“I love the implied movement of these forms, as well as the smooth, fluid shapes. They become vehicles that transport you to other places... I would like people to have a transporting experience with the work.”

On November 6, 2015, at Phillip's London, Dweck's surfboard The Duke's Mermaid (Sapphire) sold for a world record of $57,000, ranking in the top ten lots for the auction. Another was auctioned in a benefit for Southampton Hospital

== Films ==
=== The Last Race ===
Dweck's first feature-length film, The Last Race, premiered on January 22, 2018, in the U.S. Documentary Competition at the 2018 Sundance Film Festival in Park City, Utah, where it was billed as "A cinematic portrait of a small town stock car track and the tribe of drivers that call it home as they struggle to hold onto an American racing tradition." Produced and directed by Dweck under the working title "Blunderbust", it explores and documents the culture of amateur stock car drivers at the Riverhead Raceway in Riverhead, New York, and laments the impending destruction of the raceway, the last of what were once 40 on Long Island, at the hands of "big-box" stores.

The Sundance Festival described "showdowns between...Max Max-inspired stock cars do[ing] battle on a quarter-mile track," with viewers placed "eye to eye with the cars’ snarling grills and white roll bars that protrude like bones out of scarred metal" as Dweck "turns the raceway into a theater of catharsis while the track's owners struggle to maintain an American tradition as a real estate boom surrounds them."

Like The End, The Last Race builds upon Dweck's attachment to his native Long Island, but with an overtly sociopolitical message not found in previous works. As Dweck states in the synopsis of the film:

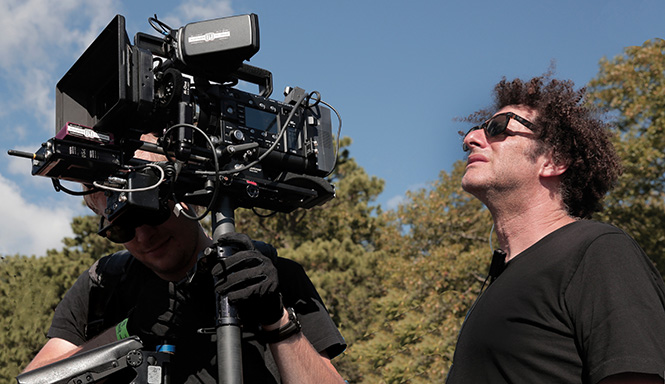
Dweck at the Riverhead Raceway directing The Last Race

On March 5th, the 10,818th Walmart broke ground in the town of Riverhead NY. No big deal, right? You drive along just about any road in America and soon enough you are bound to hit one, and if not a Walmart, it'll be any of the other big box stores that have come to define 21st-century American architecture. Interchangeable concrete boxes with corporate logos tacked on front. They are all the same, and maybe that's the idea.

The Last Race began in 2007 as a photography project. Riverhead Raceway reminded Dweck of a stock car track near his childhood home in Bellmore, where on Saturday nights he would sneak under the fence to watch the races. Dweck spent several years shooting still photographs of the race cars with an 8" x 10" camera and acquainting himself with the racing community. As Dweck recounts, "I cut the cars apart, I sandblasted them, I photographed the components and then I realized that motion and the emotion of that place were more than still photography alone could capture. It needed to be told through film." "Over that time," he said, "I created a film in my head. I had a story; I had characters, I knew how they would act, the paths that their lives would take, and the images that they would be a part of."

Telling his wife the film would be finished in a month, Dweck spent five years shooting 370 hours of footage, which would ultimately be edited into 74 minutes. By 2014, Dweck had completed the first version of the film under the title Blunderbust. The Independent Filmmaker Project, describing it as “the story of a small town American racetrack fighting for survival when land-hungry corporations come to town,” selected Blunderbust for inclusion in its 2014 Spotlight on Documentaries. This version, nearly three hours long, was centered around a storyline in the manner of a conventional film, with dramatically timed conflict and scenes selected to support the story. Dweck was dissatisfied with the result, saying,"So I went back and I looked at all my footage again. I'd say most of everything I loved wasn't in there because it didn't fit that story." He then spent the next few years, including three and a half months in Denmark, re-editing nineteen hours of source footage to create a substantially different work.

The plot revolves around a couple in their 80s, Barbara and Jim Cromarty, who have owned and operated Riverhead Raceway since 1977. With the rise in property values due to development, the Cromartys are offered over $10 million to sell the raceway, the last of its kind on Long Island, which would be replaced by a multiplex movie theater, but refuse to sell it. To sell the track, as the Florida Film Festival explains it, would "cast adrift the extended tribe of adrenaline-junky drivers, fans, and families, all inexorably linked to the asphalt oval where blue-collar glory still triumphs over white-collar profit." The Hollywood Reporter's Justin Lowe observes that the film "represents more of a living document of a dwindling American subculture than a typical sports documentary" in which Dweck "explore[s] themes of masculine identity and class representation that underlie stock car racing," with Nick Allen of RogerEbert.com characterizing the track and its racers as "nutshells of Americana, testosterone and nostalgia."

The Los Angeles Times' Kenneth Turan describes the film as "A surprisingly beautiful and immersive examination of the dying world of stock car racing on Long Island, evocative enough to be a kind of stock car symphony all by itself."• Justin Lowe writes for The Hollywood Reporter that the racing scenes "create an impressionistic, hypnotic effect that seems to be searching for some kind of emotional truth, rather than attempting a literal representation of the race competition." Stephen Saito attributes this aesthetic to Dweck's background as a photographer rather than a filmmaker.

To film the race scenes, cameras were placed at numerous locations around the racecourse as well as on and in the cars themselves. Interviewed by film writer Chris O'Fait for IndieWire about his choice of equipment, Dweck explained that he'd used a Canon EOS C300 camera in order to capture "a warm sunlight look that was reminiscent of iconic auto racing films like ‘Days of Thunder’ and the golden glow of 1970s surf photography similar to my earlier photography works," primarily with the Canon L lens due to its compactness and practicality. Vintage lenses by Arri and Zeiss were also employed, as was a Sony F5 camera. For car-mounted cameras which might be damaged by collisions, the smaller and more replaceable Canon EOS 5D Mark III and GoPro were used.

Originally tempted to accompany the racing scenes with rock music, Dweck was instead drawn to classical music including the Dies Irae of Mozart's Requiem Mass in D minor. Dweck said that he used the classical music playing on his headphones to guide the composition of many of the shots. For the remainder of the soundtrack, Dweck set up microphones around the raceway and in the cars themselves to sample over 4,000 sounds ranging from revving engines and tools being dropped to telephones being answered in the office. Sound engineer Peter Albrechtsen was paired with composer Robert Goula to create what No Film School's Oakley Andersen-Moore describes as "a half-music, half-machine sound design" in which the sounds of the track and original music transition seamlessly into one another to create what Dweck characterizes as a "distinct audio language," saying, "I don't want the audience to necessarily know where the music stops and starts or where the sound design stops and starts."

The Last Race was among the nominees for Sundance's Grand Jury Prize for Best Documentary, with a panel of film critics assembled by IndieWire voting it one of the best documentaries of the festival. In April 2018, The Last Race was shown for a second time at the Florida Film Festival in Maitland, Florida, where it won the festival's Special Jury Award for Artistic Vision.

On March 27, 2018, Magnolia Pictures acquired the rights to distribute The Last Race in the United States, with release planned for later in the year.

=== The Truffle Hunters ===
Dweck's second feature-length film The Truffle Hunters, produced and directed with Gregory Kershaw, takes place in the northern Italian region of Piedmont. Dweck began exploring the possibility of a film about truffle hunting when visiting a small Piedmontese village where truffles are harvested from the surrounding woods. A villager told him, ‘I put 50 euros outside in a box at night, and in the morning, a truffle appears. And I have no idea how it gets there.’” Intrigued, Dweck spent much of the next year meeting people in the truffle hunting community, typically in their homes over wine and espresso, and gaining their trust.

The central object of the film is the Alba truffle, or tartufo blanco, a highly prized culinary delicacy found primarily in the densely-forested hills of Piedmont. To find the truffles, seasoned hunters, most of whom in the film are in their 80s, search the woods with their dogs, whose olfactory powers detect the truffles growing underground. After a successful hunt, the truffles are smelled and sampled by gourmet buyers who in turn sell them to high-end restaurants around the world. Much of the film's dialog is in not standard Italian but Piedmontese Additionally, Dweck discovered that the hunters communicate with their dogs using a set of terms which are neither Italian nor Piedmontese but are unique to their trade.

The Truffle Hunters continues a theme found throughout Dweck's work, including his previous film The Last Race, of an endangered social enclave threatened by the forces of modernity. Screen Daily's Lee Marshall characterizes the film as "...a lament for a dying trade and the frugal lives of the rural folk who still pursue it ...", calling it and The Last Race "elegies for a disappearing world." In the words of executive producer Luca Guadagnino, "The Truffle Hunters is about a group at the end of their lives who see their world fading and their place in reality increasingly on the boundaries...It's about mortality and approaching death," likening it to "a companion piece to The Irishman."

Among the chief threats to the truffle trade are the effects of climate change, with increasingly warmer and dryer winter soils as well as deforestation yielding fewer truffles to be found. As in The Last Race, the realities of capitalism loom menacingly in the background, not only climate change but also regional economic problems and cutthroat competition, with hunters resorting to elaborate measures to hide their secrets from newcomers who seek to pillage their lands. Implicit in the film is the stark difference between the modest class backgrounds of the hunters and those of the luxury product's consumers.

Dweck sought to create the atmosphere of what he called a "real-life fairytale" by shooting uninterrupted scenes from fixed vantage points, often filming only one scene a day. "By combining the monumental stillness of each frame with the movement of life and rhythm of editing," he explained, "we sought to construct a film that flowed like a stream of paintings to tell a story that is felt more than understood." As film critic Tomris Laffly describes it, "Fusing numerous painterly, layered and romantically lit single-frame shots together, the filmmakers create a sequence of mini episodes, while the human characters and their impossibly cute and clever dogs go on about their daily routine amid these scrumptious tableaux." Lee Marshall located the film's milieu in "a real world that is also a magical realist elsewhere" which "leads us into a distant, pre-technological past that still exists in the present and could even be a vision of some strange regressive future." The Hollywood Reporter's David Rooney praised the film's use of color, "from the variegated shades of the forest to a table of ripe red tomatoes or baskets of succulent green grapes being poured into a barrel for winemaking." To these visuals are set both mid-century Italian pop songs and Italian opera.

Another echo of The Last Race is innovative camera placement, in this case not on racecars but on the dogs themselves using a device which Dweck calls the "dog cam". Attached to the dogs' heads using a custom harness, it depicts the action from their points of view, through the hunt to the moment of success when the scent of the hidden truffle is detected. The head mounts were created by a local shoe cobbler.

The Truffle Hunters premiered on January 28, 2020, in Park City, Utah, at the 2020 Sundance Film Festival. The question and answer session following the screening featured a live video call with one of the hunters and his dog in the woods looking for truffles. It was named among the best films at Sundance by the Los Angeles Times, Rolling Stone, The Observer, IndieWire, Screen Anarchy and Thrillist. Following its premiere at Sundance, Sony Pictures Classics outbid its competitors to purchase worldwide distribution rights to The Truffle Hunters for $1.5 million. In May 2020, Dweck and Kershaw signed with United Talent Agency to represent Beautiful Stories, a company they formed to produce film and television projects for a global audience.

The Truffle Hunters was scheduled to appear in May at the 2020 Cannes Film Festival, but the festival was cancelled due to the COVID-19 pandemic. It was then to appear over the Labor Day weekend at the Telluride Film Festival, but that too was cancelled due to the pandemic. It is currently scheduled to appear at the Toronto Film Festival on September 18, 2020, and at the New York Film Festival on October 5, 2020.

==== Truffle Hunters Conservation Fund ====
During the filming, one of the hunters phoned at 4 a.m., saying that the forest was being destroyed. When Dweck and Kershaw arrived, they found that old-growth oak forest which they'd filmed only days earlier had been cut down, with the hunter pleading with the lumberjacks not to cut down any more trees. Dweck recalled, "We rushed down to this part of the forest where we had filmed days before, and two men with chainsaws had just cut down every tree, decimated like two hectares of land, these 200-year-old oak trees. That's when we realized how fragile this ecosystem and this culture of truffle hunting really is."

After filming was complete, Dweck and Kershaw created the Truffle Hunters Conservation Fund, which, working in coordination with truffle-hunting communities, raises money from American supporters to acquire some of the truffle forests in the region and save them from destruction. Two wine labels of Nebbiolo and Barolo varieties, which are characteristic of the Piedmont region, were created to help fund the conservation efforts, with proceeds from their sale going to the local Terre di Tartufi (Truffle Lands) organization. As of November 2021, 23 hectares of forest between Ferrere and Cisterna had been spared from destruction, with a nature reserve in Cisterna named after the film.

=== Gaucho Gaucho ===
Dweck's third feature-length film Gaucho Gaucho, produced and directed once again with Gregory Kershaw, takes place in the northwestern cattle country of Argentina, where water scarcity impacts the lives of rodeo horsemen. The film also follows a character named Guada, a teenage girl striving to join the male-dominated gaucho culture. It premiered at the 2024 Sundance Film Festival, where it won a Special Jury Prize for Sound.

== Publications ==
- The End: Montauk, N.Y., 2004, ISBN 0-8109-5008-1
- Mermaids, 2008, ISBN 978-0-9818465-0-7
- Habana Libre, 2011, ISBN 978-88-6208-184-9

== Filmography ==
- The Last Race (2018)
- The Truffle Hunters (2020)
- Gaucho Gaucho (2024)
- Burgundy (2026)

== Noteworthy photographs and sculptures ==
- Sonya, Poles – Montauk, New York, 2002. Sold at auction July 1, 2009, at Christie's in London for £10,625 ($17,516,) then on April 9, 2011, at Phillips in New York for $30,000, then on October 3, 2018, at Sotheby's in New York for $168,750.
- Dave and Pam in their Caddy – Montauk, New York, 2002. Sold at auction July 1, 2009, at Christie's in London for £7,400 ($12,199.)
- Mermaid 1 – Amagansett, New York, 2005. Sold at auction July 1, 2009, at Christie's in London for £10,625 ($17,516.)
- Surf's Up 1 – Montauk, New York, 2006. Sold at auction July 1, 2009, at Christie's in London for £20,000 ($32,972,) then on November 18, 2014, at Phillips in London for £30,000 ($46,866.)
- Mermaid 18 – Weeki Wachee, Florida, 2007. Sold at auction May 18, 2011, at Bukowskis in Stockholm for 159,250 SEK ($25,288,) then on May 21, 2015, at Phillips in London for £27,500 ($43,066.)
- The Duke's Mermaid (Sapphire) – 2015. Sold at auction November 6, 2015, at Phillips in London for £37,500 ($56,435,) Dweck's world auction record at the time.
- Mermaid 18b – Weeki Wachee, Florida, 2007. Sold at auction November 3, 2016, at Phillips in London for £27,500 ($34,276.)
- Triple Gidget – 2015. Sold at auction November 2, 2017, at Phillips in London for £57,500 ($75,066,) currently Dweck's world auction record.

== Exhibitions ==
- September 2003: The End: Montauk, NY, Sotheby's. New York, NY.
- September 30 – November 15, 2005: Three, Aoyama. Tokyo, Japan.
- April 1–29, 2006: A Surfer's Life, Gallery Orchard, Oosu, Naka-Ku, Japan.
- May 30 – July 15, 2006: A Surfer's Life, Blitz House. Meguro-ku and Shimomeguro. Tokyo, Japan.
- November 17 – December 28, 2006: A Surfer's Life, Nagoya, Tokyo, Japan.
- March 1 – April 20, 2008: Michael Dweck, Maruani & Noirhomme Gallery. Knokke, Belgium.
- May 15 – September 1, 2008: Mermaids, Delphine Pastor Galery, Monte Carlo, Monaco in collaboration with Maruani & Noirhomme Gallery.
- June 19 – September 1, 2008: Mermaids, Staley Wise Gallery. New York, NY.
- September 13 – October 4, 2008: Michael Dweck: Mermaids, The End, and Flowers, Keszler Gallery. Southampton, NY.
- September 19 – November 10, 2008: Mermaids, Robert Morat Galerie. Hamburg, Germany.
- October 15 – December 15, 2008: Mermaids, Blitz Gallery. Tokyo, Japan.
- January 24 – March 14, 2009: Mermaids, Gallery Orchard. Nagoya, Japan.
- June 24 – August 28, 2010: Michael Dweck: Paradise Lost, MODERNISM. San Francisco, CA.
- September 16 – October 25, 2010: American Mermaid, Acte 2 Galerie. Paris, France, in collaboration with Maruani & Noirhomme Gallery.
- September 8 – October 29, 2011: Habana Libre, MODERNISM. San Francisco, CA.
- December 30, 2010 – February 15, 2011: Michael Dweck: Giant Pin-Up Polaroids, Maruani & Noirhomme Gallery. Knokke, Belgium.
- November 17 – December 8, 2011: Michael Dweck: Island Life, Izzy Gallery. Toronto, Ontario, Canada.
- December 2, 2011 – February 25, 2012: Habana Libre, Blitz Gallery. Tokyo, Japan.
- December 9, 2011 – January 28, 2012: Michael Dweck: The End and Habana Libre, Staley Wise Gallery. New York, NY.
- February 24 – March 24, 2012: Michael Dweck: Habana Libre, Fototeca de Cuba Museum, Havana.
- July 11 – September 13, 2014: Michael Dweck & Howard Schatz: Underwater, Staley Wise Gallery. New York, NY.
- May 7 – August 29, 2015: Michael Dweck: Nymphs & Sirens, MODERNISM, San Francisco.
- February 25 – April 23, 2016: Michael Dweck: Paradise Lost, Blitz Gallery, Tokyo.
- September 9, 2017 – March 4, 2018: Cuba IS, Annenberg Space for Photography. Los Angeles, California.

== Awards ==
- 1998 – Gold Lion – Cannes International Festival for Arctic Ground Squirrel
- 2000 – Advertising Excellence – AICP – Work entered into the permanent collection of the Department of Film, Museum of Modern Art, New York.
- 2018 – Special Jury Award for Artistic Vision – Florida Film Festival
