= Jennifer Brea =

American filmmaker

- Education: Harvard University
- Occupations: Filmmaker and activist

Jennifer Brea is an American documentary filmmaker and activist. Her debut feature, Unrest, premiered at the 2017 Sundance Film Festival and received the US Documentary Special Jury Award For Editing. Brea also co-created a virtual reality film which premiered at the Tribeca Film Festival.

In 2012, Brea married Omar Wasow, co-founder of BlackPlanet and currently an assistant professor at University of California, Berkeley. Brea was a PhD student at Harvard University when she became suddenly ill with a high fever and became bedridden. She was initially misdiagnosed with conversion disorder, but eventually was identified as having myalgic encephalomyelitis (ME), also known as chronic fatigue syndrome (CFS).

In 2013, she began making a documentary film from bed about her experience. Initially called "Canary in a Coal Mine", it raised significant production funds on Kickstarter via a campaign that mobilized the online community of many other homebound and bedbound patients and their families. Unrest premiered at the 2017 Sundance Film Festival and aired on PBS's Independent Lens on January 8, 2018. It was shortlisted for an Oscar for best documentary film.

In 2014, The Root recognized her as one of the hundred most influential African-Americans in its Root100 list. Brea was also recognized as ProHealth's "2017 ME/CFS Patient Advocate Of The Year." In 2015 she co-founded #MEAction, a global network of patients living with ME. MEAction went on to spearhead the #MillionsMissing movement, a patient-centered protest in which hundreds of empty shoes were displayed in order to represent the 25% of patients with ME who are housebound or bedbound. In June 2016, Brea gave a TED Talk on her experience as a person with ME.
